= Iburihashi Station =

Railway station in Kaga, Ishikawa Prefecture, Japan

Iburihashi Station 動橋駅
- Iburihashi Station in October 2026

General information
- Location: 92 Iburibashi-machi, Kaga-shi, Ishikawa-ken 922-0331; Japan
- Coordinates: 36.3286°N 136.3830°E
- Operator: IR Ishikawa Railway
- Line: ■ IR Ishikawa Railway Line
- Distance: 7.3 km from Daishoji
- Platforms: 2 Side platforms
- Tracks: 2

Construction
- Structure type: Ground level

Other information
- Status: Unstaffed
- Website: Official website

History
- Opened: 20 September 1897
- Former names: Iburibashi (until 1956)

Passengers
- FY2015: 555 daily
Location
- Location within Japan

Iburihashi Station (動橋駅, Iburihashi-eki) is a railway station on the IR Ishikawa Railway Line in Kaga, Ishikawa, Japan, operated by IR Ishikawa Railway.

== Lines ==
Iburihashi Station is served by the Hokuriku Main Line and is 7.3 kilometers from the starting point of the line at Daishoji.

== Station layout ==
The station consists of two opposed side platforms connected by a level crossing. The station is unattended.

=== Platforms ===
1	■ IR Ishikawa Railway Line	for Fukui and Tsuruga
2	■ IR Ishikawa Railway Line	for Komatsu and Kanazawa

== Adjacent stations ==
«	Service	»
IR Ishikawa Railway Line
Kagaonsen	Rapid Service	Awazu
Kagaonsen	Local	Awazu

== History ==
The station opened on 20 September 1897. With the privatization of JNR on 1 April 1987, the station came under the control of JR West.

On 16 March 2024, the station came under the aegis of the IR Ishikawa Railway due to the extension of the Hokuriku Shinkansen from Kanazawa to Tsuruga.

== Surrounding area ==
- Iburibashi Post Office
- Katayamazu onsen

== See also ==
- List of railway stations in Japan
