= Nonoichi Station (IR Ishikawa Railway) =

Railway station in Nonoichi, Ishikawa Prefecture, Japan

Nonoichi Station 野々市駅
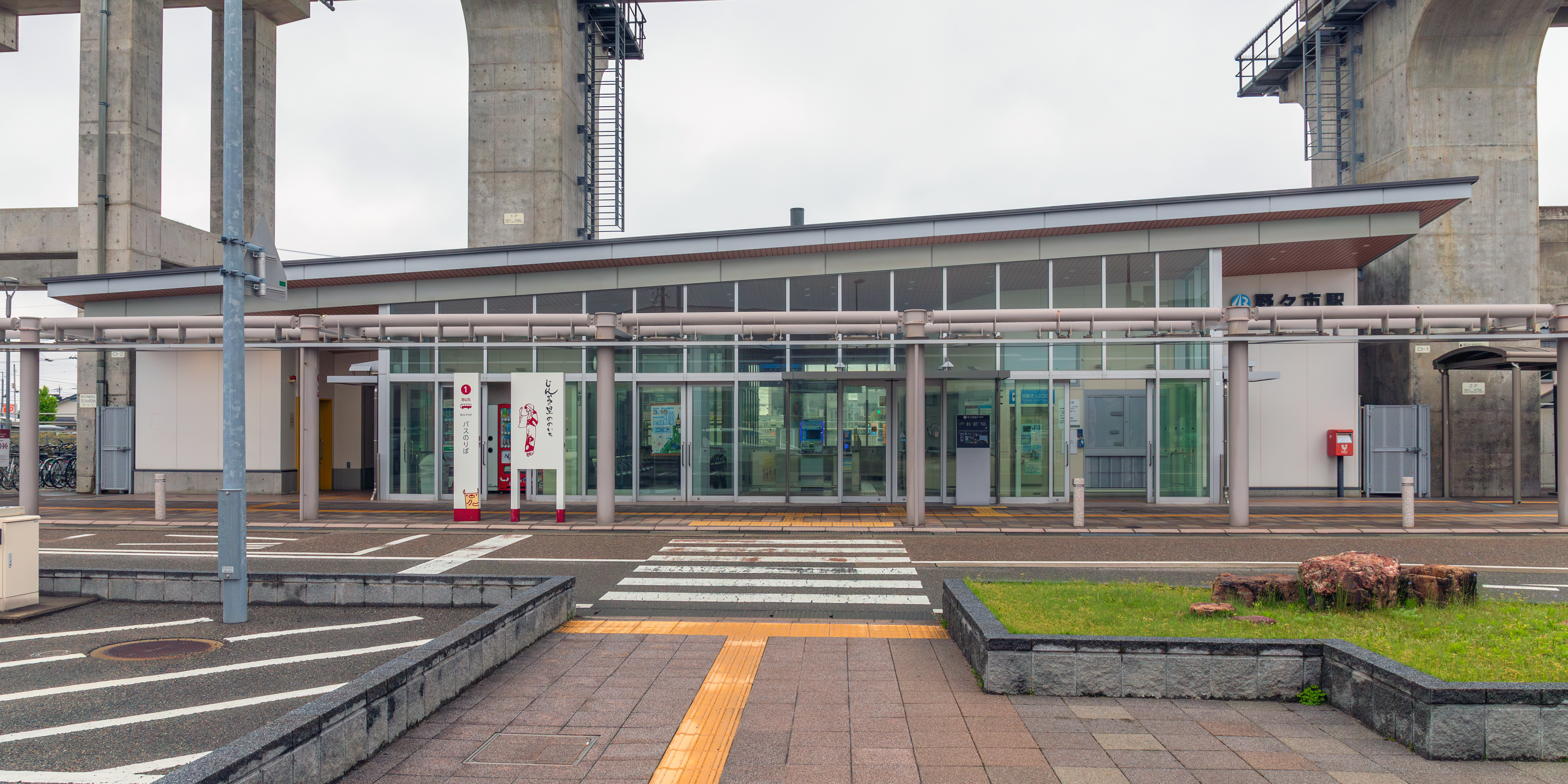
- Nonoichi Station in April 2024

General information
- Location: 1-1 Futsukaichi-machi, Nonoichi City, Ishikawa Prefecture 921-0000; Japan
- Coordinates: 36°32′30″N 136°35′53″E
- Operator: IR Ishikawa Railway
- Line: IR Ishikawa Railway Line
- Distance: 40.3 km (25.0 mi) from Daishōji
- Platforms: 2 side platforms
- Tracks: 2

Construction
- Structure type: At grade

Other information
- Status: Unstaffed station (automatic ticket vending machine installed)
- Website: Official website

History
- Opened: 23 March 1968; 58 years ago

Passengers
- FY2019: 2,000 (boarding only)
Location
- Location within Ishikawa Prefecture Location within Chubu region Location within Japan

Nonoichi Station (野々市駅, Nonoichi-eki) is a railway station on the IR Ishikawa Railway Line in the city of Nonoichi, Ishikawa, Japan, operated by IR Ishikawa Railway.

== Lines ==
Nonoichi Station is served by the IR Ishikawa Railway Line, and is 40.3 kilometers from the start of the line at Daishōji.

== Station layout ==
The station consists of two opposed side platforms connected by a footbridge. The station is attended.

=== Platforms ===
1	■ IR Ishikawa Railway Line	for Komatsu and Fukui
2	■ IR Ishikawa Railway Line	for Kanazawa

== History ==
Nonoichi Station opened on 25 March 1968. With the privatization of Japanese National Railways (JNR) on 1 April 1987, the station came under the control of West Japan Railway Company (JR West).

On 16 March 2024, the station came under the aegis of the IR Ishikawa Railway due to the extension of the Hokuriku Shinkansen from Kanazawa to Tsuruga.

== Adjacent stations ==
«	Service	»
IR Ishikawa Railway Line
Mattō	local	Nishi-Kanazawa

== Passenger statistics ==
In fiscal 2015, the station was used by an average of 1,758 passengers daily (boarding passengers only).

== Surrounding area ==
- Okyōzuka Site

== See also ==
- List of railway stations in Japan
