= Komaiko Station =

Railway station in Hakusan, Ishikawa Prefecture, Japan

Komaiko Station 小舞子駅
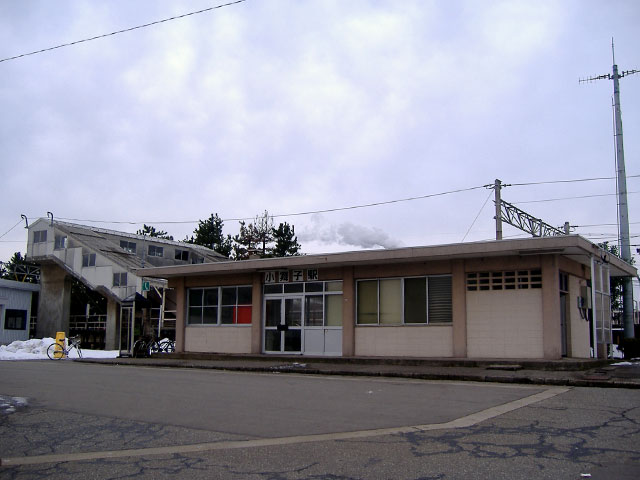
- Komaiko Station in February 2006

General information
- Location: 16 Minato-machi So, Hakusan-shi, Ishikawa-ken 929-0217; Japan
- Coordinates: 36.4763°N 136.4750°E
- Operator: IR Ishikawa Railway
- Line: IR Ishikawa Railway Line
- Distance: 26.8 km from Daishōji
- Platforms: 2 side platforms
- Tracks: 2

Other information
- Status: Unstaffed
- Website: Official website

History
- Opened: 10 April 1964

Passengers
- FY2015: 300 daily
Location
- Location within Japan

Komaiko Station (小舞子駅, Komaiko-eki) is a railway station on the IR Ishikawa Railway Line in the city of Hakusan, Ishikawa, Japan, operated by IR Ishikawa Railway.

== Lines ==
Komaiko Station is served by the IR Ishikawa Railway Line, and is 26.8 kilometers from the start of the line at Daishōji.

== Station layout ==
The station consists of two opposed unnumbered side platforms connected by a level crossing. The station is unattended.

=== Platforms ===
| station side | ■ IR Ishikawa Railway Line | for Komatsu and Fukui |
| opposite side | ■ IR Ishikawa Railway Line | for Kanazawa |

== Adjacent stations ==
| « | Service | » |
IR Ishikawa Railway Line
| Nomi-Neagari | local | Mikawa |

== History ==
Komaiko Station opened on 10 April 1964, although a temporary signal stop had existed since 20 June 1903. With the privatization of Japanese National Railways (JNR) on 1 April 1987, the station came under the control of West Japan Railway Company (JR West).

On 16 March 2024, the station came under the aegis of the IR Ishikawa Railway due to the extension of the Hokuriku Shinkansen from Kanazawa to Tsuruga.

== Surrounding area ==
- Tedori River

== See also ==
- List of railway stations in Japan
