= Nomi-Neagari Station =

Railway station in Nomi, Ishikawa Prefecture, Japan

Nomi-Neagari Station 能美根上駅
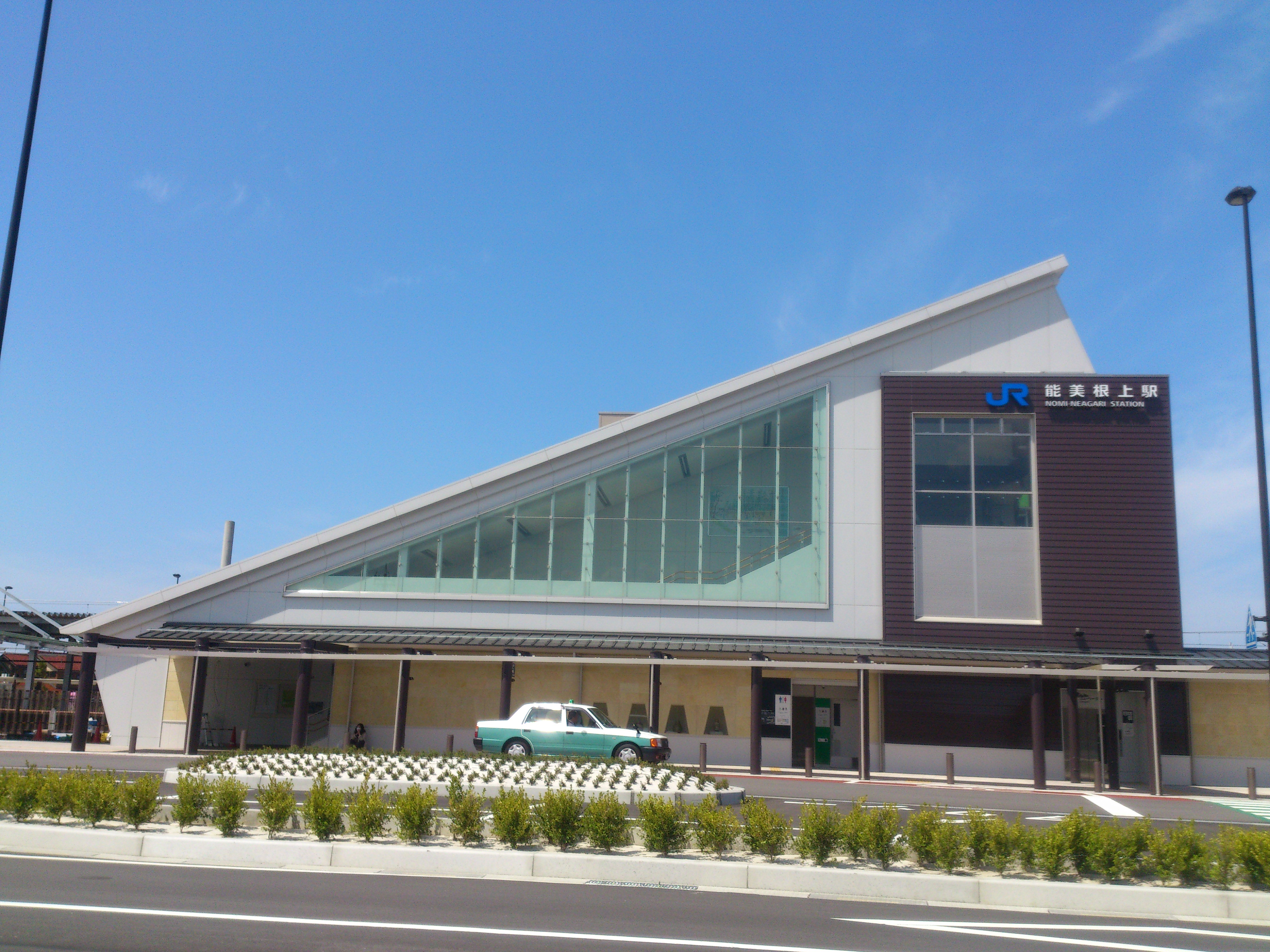
- Nomi-Neagari Station in April 2015

General information
- Location: 303 Taisei-machi, Nomi-shi, Ishikawa-ken 929-0122; Japan
- Coordinates: 36.4518°N 136.4601°E
- Operator: IR Ishikawa Railway
- Line: IR Ishikawa Railway Line
- Distance: 23.8 km from Daishōji
- Platforms: 1 island platform
- Tracks: 2

Other information
- Status: Unstaffed station (Automatic ticket vending machine installed)
- Website: Official website

History
- Opened: 20 December 1912
- Former names: Terai (until 2015)

Passengers
- FY2015: 1217
Location
- Location within Japan

Nomi-Neagari Station (能美根上駅, Nomi-neagari-eki) is a railway station on the IR Ishikawa Railway Line in the city of Nomi, Ishikawa, Japan, operated by IR Ishikawa Railway.

== Lines ==
Nomi-Neagari Station is served by the IR Ishikawa Railway Line, and is 23.8 kilometers from the start of the line at Daishōji.

== Station layout ==
The station consists of one island platform with an elevated station building built above the platform. The station is unstaffed.

=== Platforms ===
1	■ IR Ishikawa Railway Line	for Komatsu and Fukui
2	■ IR Ishikawa Railway Line	for Kanazawa

== Adjacent stations ==
«	Service	»
IR Ishikawa Railway Line
Komatsu	Rapid Service	Mattō
Meihō	Local	Komaiko

== History ==
The station opened on 20 December 1912 as Terai Station (寺井駅). With the privatization of JNR on 1 April 1987, the station came under the control of West Japan Railway Company (JR West). The station name was changed to its present name on 14 March 2015. The name was changed to provide a closer association with the city of Nomi, as it is the only station in the city.

On 16 March 2024, the station came under the aegis of the IR Ishikawa Railway due to the extension of the Hokuriku Shinkansen from Kanazawa to Tsuruga.

== Passenger statistics ==
In fiscal 2015, the station was used by an average of 1,217 passengers daily (boarding passengers only).

== Surrounding area ==
- former Neagari Town Hall
- Neagari Junior High School

== See also ==
- List of railway stations in Japan
