= Kaga-Kasama Station =

Railway station in Hakusan, Ishikawa Prefecture, Japan

Kaga-Kasama Station 加賀笠間駅
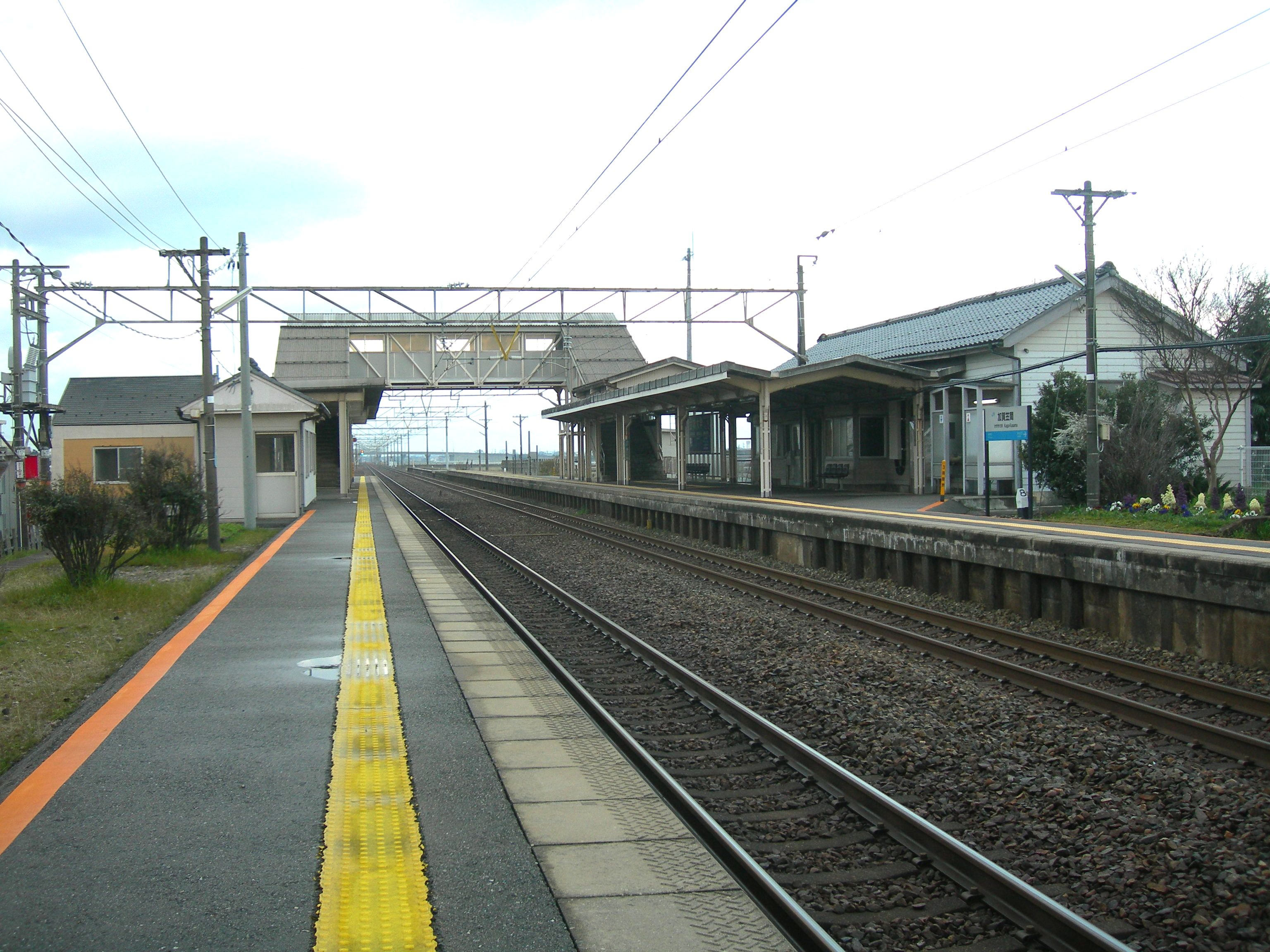
- Kaga-Kasama Station platforms in April 2009

General information
- Location: Kasama-machi, Hakusan-shi, Ishikawa-ken 924-0063; Japan
- Coordinates: 36.5027°N 136.5276°E
- Operator: IR Ishikawa Railway
- Line: IR Ishikawa Railway Line
- Distance: 32.6 km from Daishōji
- Platforms: 2 side platforms
- Tracks: 2

Other information
- Status: Unstaffed
- Website: Official website

History
- Opened: 1 August 1923

Passengers
- FY2015: 1552
Location
- Location within Japan

Kaga-Kasama Station (加賀笠間駅, Kaga-Kasama-eki) is a railway station on the IR Ishikawa Railway Line in the city of Hakusan, Ishikawa, Japan, operated by IR Ishikawa Railway.

== Lines ==
Kaga-Kasama Station is served by the IR Ishikawa Railway Line, and is 32.6 kilometers from the start of the line at Daishōji.

== Station layout ==
The station consists of two opposed side platforms, numbered 1 on the west side and 2 on the east side, connected by a footbridge. Each platform has an unattended station building.

=== Platforms ===
1	■ IR Ishikawa Railway Line	for Kanazawa
2	■ IR Ishikawa Railway Line	for Fukui

== History ==
Kaga-Kasama Station opened on 1 August 1923. With the privatization of Japanese National Railways (JNR) on 1 April 1987, the station came under the control of West Japan Railway Company (JR West).

On 16 March 2024, the station came under the aegis of the IR Ishikawa Railway due to the extension of the Hokuriku Shinkansen from Kanazawa to Tsuruga.

== Adjacent stations ==
«	Service	»
IR Ishikawa Railway Line
Mikawa	local	Nishi-Mattō

== Passenger statistics ==
In fiscal 2015, the station was used by an average of 1,552 passengers daily (boarding passengers only).

== Surrounding area ==
- Kinjo University

== See also ==
- List of railway stations in Japan
