= Mikawa Station (Ishikawa) =

Railway station in Hakusan, Ishikawa Prefecture, Japan

Mikawa Station 美川駅
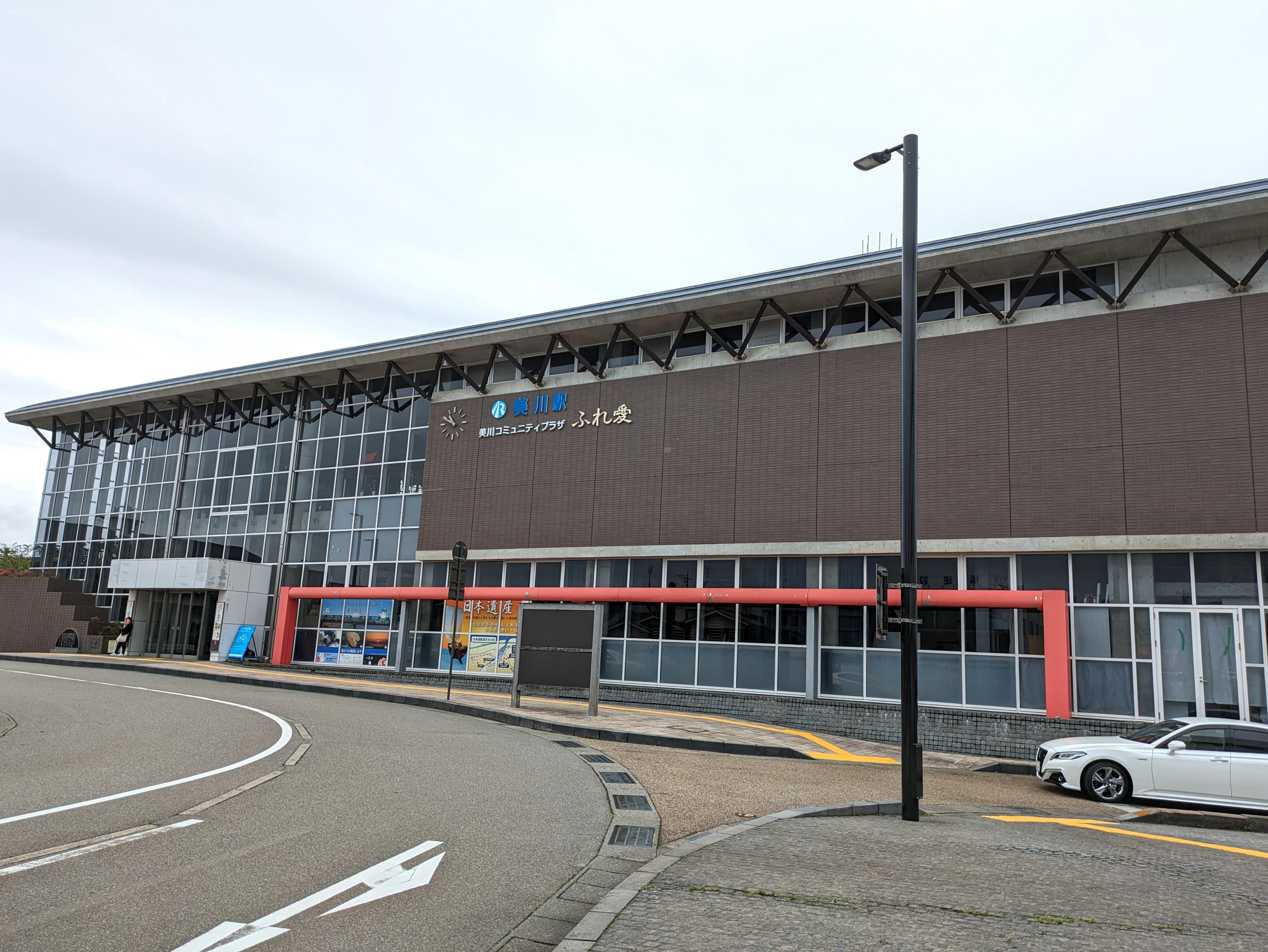
- Mikawa Station in April 2024

General information
- Location: 221 Mikawanaka-machi Ro, Hakusan-shi, Ishikawa-ken 929-0224; Japan
- Coordinates: 36.4862°N 136.4890°E
- Operator: IR Ishikawa Railway
- Line: IR Ishikawa Railway Line
- Distance: 28.6 km from Daishōji
- Platforms: 1 side + 1 island platform
- Tracks: 3

Other information
- Status: Unstaffed
- Website: Official website

History
- Opened: 1 April 1898

Passengers
- FY2015: 840
Location
- Location within Japan

Mikawa Station (美川駅, Mikawa-eki) is a railway station on the IR Ishikawa Railway Line in the city of Hakusan, Ishikawa, Japan, operated by IR Ishikawa Railway.

== Lines ==
Mikawa Station is served by the Hokuriku Main Line, and is 28.6 kilometers from the start of the line at Daishōji.

== Station layout ==
The station consists of one side platform and one island platform connected by an elevated station building. The station is unstaffed.

=== Platforms ===
1	■ IR Ishikawa Railway Line	for Kanazawa
2	■ IR Ishikawa Railway Line	for Fukui and Kanazawa
3	■ IR Ishikawa Railway Line	for Fukui

== Adjacent stations ==
«	Service	»
IR Ishikawa Railway Line
Komaiko	local	Kaga-Kasama

== History ==
Mikawa Station opened on 1 April 1898. With the privatization of Japanese National Railways (JNR) on 1 April 1987, the station came under the control of West Japan Railway Company (JR West).

On 16 March 2024, the station came under the aegis of the IR Ishikawa Railway due to the extension of the Hokuriku Shinkansen from Kanazawa to Tsuruga.

== Passenger statistics ==
In fiscal 2015, the station was used by an average of 840 passengers daily (boarding passengers only).

== Surrounding area ==
- Tedori River
- Mikawa Post Office
- Mikawa Elementary School
- Mikawa Junior High School
- Mikawa onsen

== See also ==
- List of railway stations in Japan
