= Mattō Station =

Railway station in Hakusan, Ishikawa Prefecture, Japan

Mattō Station 松任駅
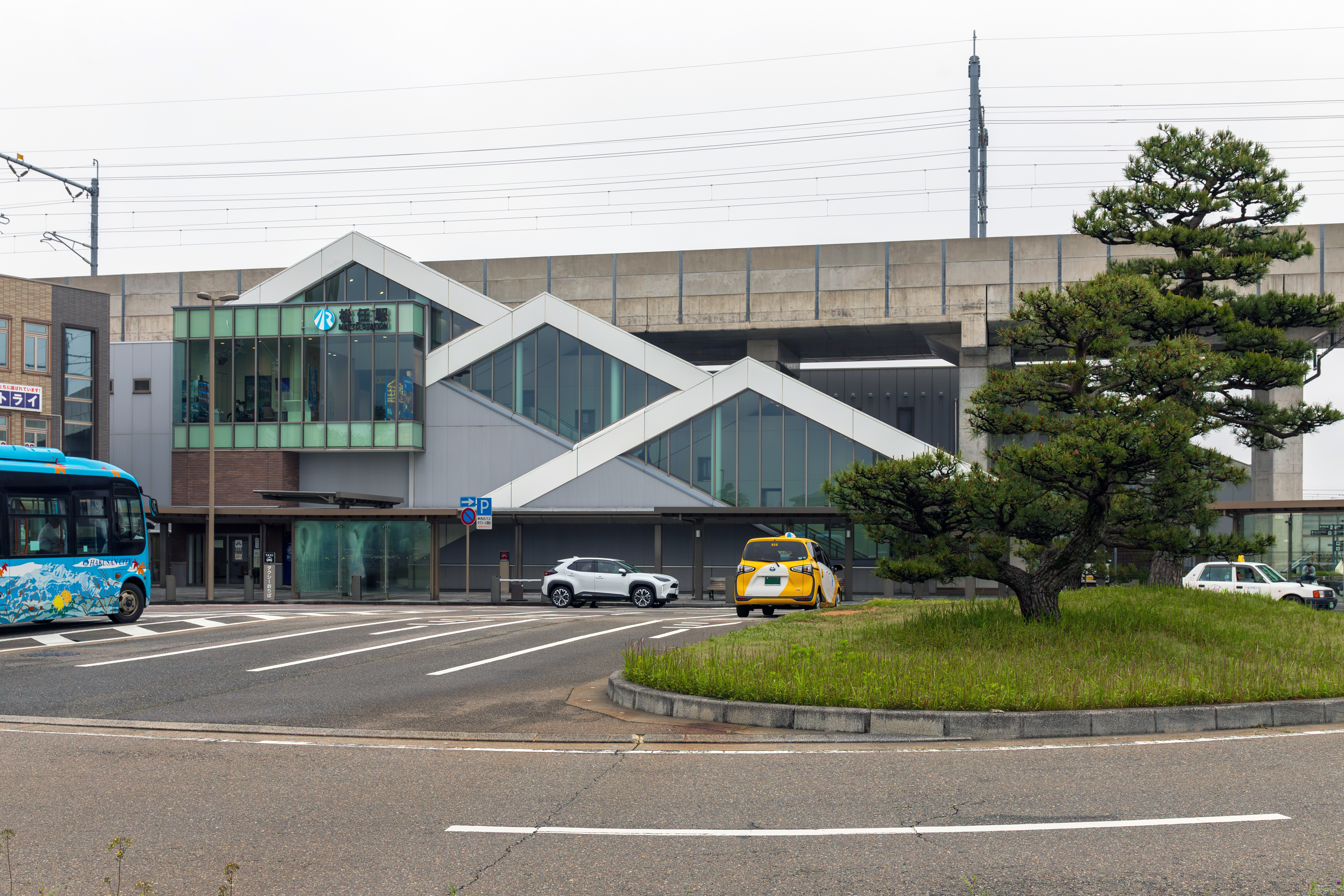
- South Exit, April 2024

General information
- Location: 1020 Ainoki-machi, Hakusan City, Ishikawa Prefecture 924-0022; Japan
- Coordinates: 36.5269°N 136.5663°E
- Operator: IR Ishikawa Railway
- Line: IR Ishikawa Railway Line
- Distance: 37.0 km (23.0 mi) from Daishōji
- Platforms: 1 side + 1 island platform
- Tracks: 3

Construction
- Structure type: At grade

Other information
- Status: Staffed
- Website: Official website

History
- Opened: 1 April 1898; 128 years ago

Passengers
- FY2019: 3,758 daily (boarding only)
Location
- Location within Ishikawa Prefecture Location within Chubu region Location within Japan

Mattō Station (松任駅, Mattō-eki) is a railway station on the IR Ishikawa Railway Line in the city of Hakusan, Ishikawa, Japan, operated by IR Ishikawa Railway.

== Lines ==
Mattō Station is served by the IR Ishikawa Railway Line, and is 37.0 kilometers from the start of the line at Daishōji.

== Station layout ==
The station consists of one elevated side platform and one elevated island platform with the station building located underneath. The station has a staffed ticket office.

=== Platforms ===
1	■ IR Ishikawa Railway Line	for Fukui
2	■ IR Ishikawa Railway Line	for Fukui and Kanazawa
3	■ IR Ishikawa Railway Line	for Kanazawa

== History ==
Mattō Station opened on 1 April 1898. With the privatization of Japanese National Railways (JNR) on 1 April 1987, the station came under the control of West Japan Railway Company (JR West).

On 16 March 2024, the station came under the aegis of the IR Ishikawa Railway due to the extension of the Hokuriku Shinkansen from Kanazawa to Tsuruga.

== Adjacent stations ==
«	Service	»
IR Ishikawa Railway Line
Nomi-Neagari	Rapid Service	Kanazawa
Nishi-Mattō	Local	Nonoichi

== Passenger statistics ==
In fiscal 2015, the station was used by an average of 3,493 passengers daily (boarding passengers only).

== Surrounding area ==
- Mattō Castle site
- Mattō High School
- Hakusan City Museum

== Gallery ==
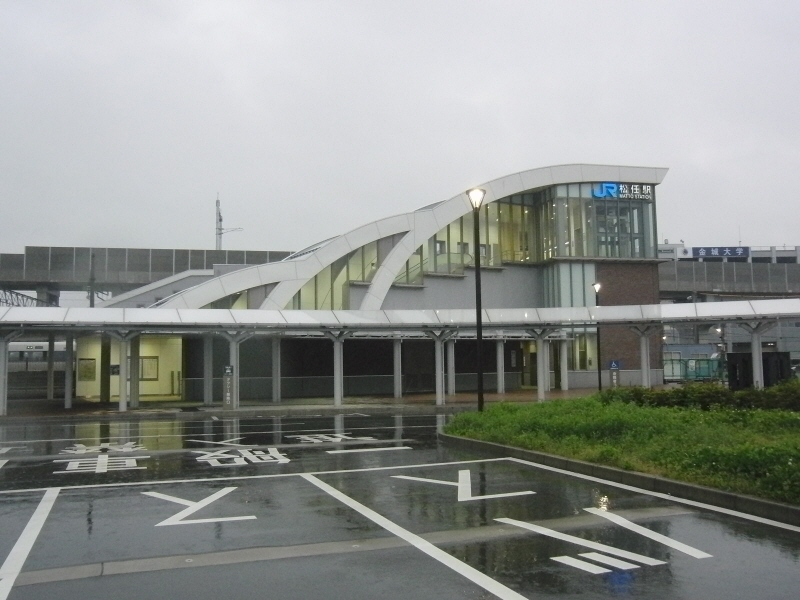
Mattō Station platforms in April 2013

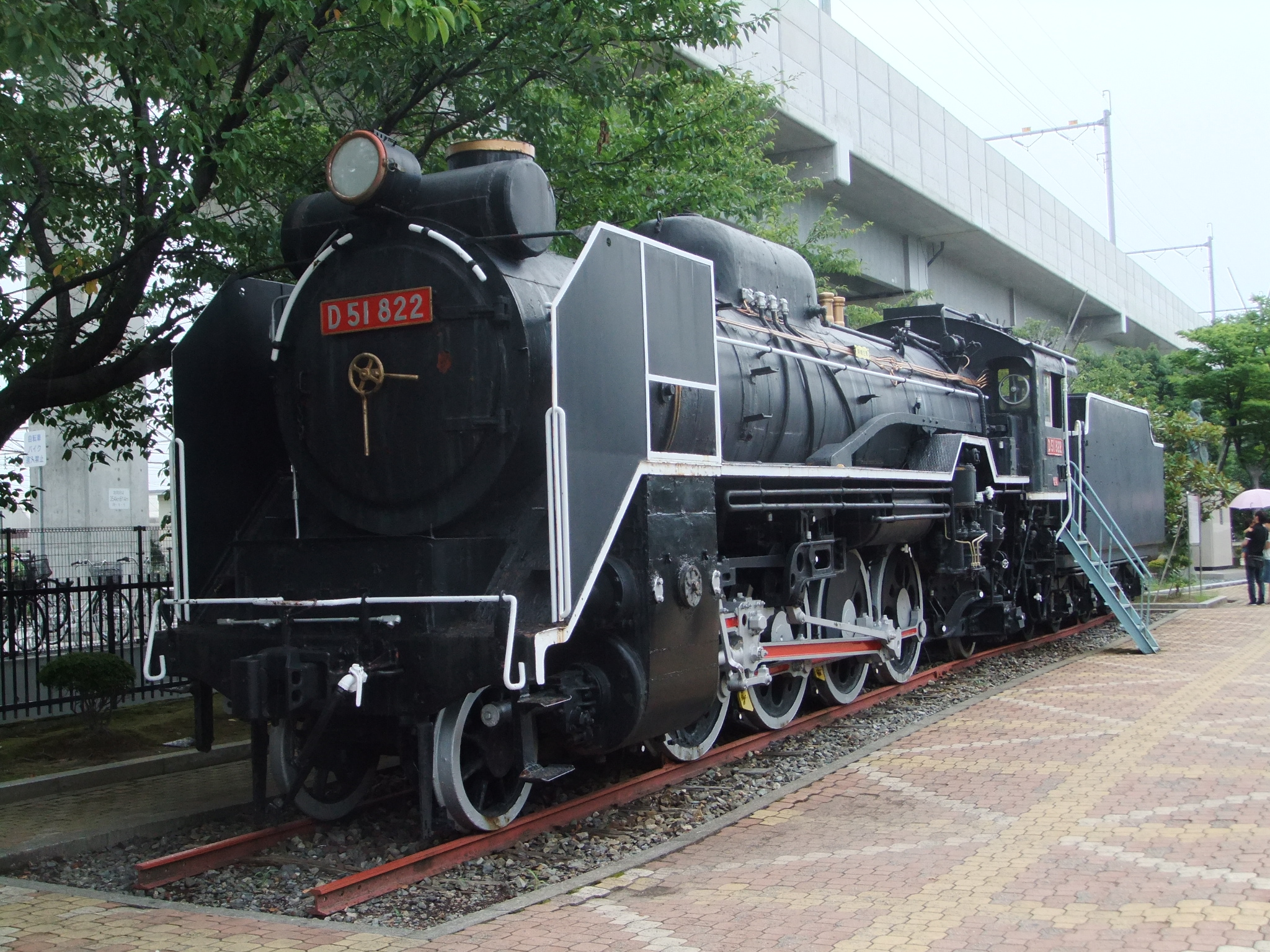
D51 822 preserved in the station square, August 2014

== See also ==
- List of railway stations in Japan
