= Tomari =

Tomari may refer to:

- Tomari, Russia, a town in Sakhalin Oblast, Russia
  - Tomari (crater), a crater on Mars, named after the town
- Tomari, Hokkaido, a village in Japan
- Tomari, Tottori, a village in Tottori Prefecture, Japan; dissolved in 2004
- Tomari, Okinawa, a neighborhood in Naha, Okinawa Prefecture, Japan
- Tomari Station (disambiguation), train stations in Japan
- Tomari-te, an Okinawan martial art
- Golovnino, a village on the disputed island of Kunashir, formerly named Tomari
