= Awazu Station =

Awazu Station (粟津駅) is the name of two train stations in Japan:

- Awazu Station (Ishikawa)
- Awazu Station (Shiga)
