= Awazu Station (Ishikawa) =

Railway station in Komatsu, Japan

Awazu Station 粟津駅
- Awazu Station in October 2026

General information
- Location: 2-1-8 Matsu-machi, Komatsu-shi, Ishikawa-ken 923-0302; Japan
- Coordinates: 36°21′20″N 136°25′29″E
- Operator: IR Ishikawa Railway
- Line: ■ IR Ishikawa Railway Line
- Distance: 12.2 km from Daishoji
- Platforms: 2 island platforms
- Tracks: 2

Construction
- Structure type: Ground level

Other information
- Status: Unstaffed
- Website: Official website

History
- Opened: 16 November 1907

Passengers
- FY2015: 1300 daily
Location
- Location within Japan

Awazu Station (粟津駅, Awazu-eki) is a railway station in Komatsu, Ishikawa Prefecture, Japan, operated by IR Ishikawa Railway.

== Lines ==
Awazu Station is only served by the IR Ishikawa Railway Line.

== Station layout ==
The station consists of two ground-level island platforms connected by an underground passage. The station is unstaffed, but there is an automatic ticket vending machine.

=== Platforms ===
1	■ IR Ishikawa Railway Line	for Fukui, and Tsuruga
2	■ IR Ishikawa Railway Line	for Komatsu and Kanazawa

== Adjacent stations ==
«	Service	»
IR Ishikawa Railway Line
Iburihashi	Rapid Service	Komatsu
Iburihashi	Local	Komatsu

== History ==
Awazu Station opened on 16 November 1907. With the privatization of JNR on 1 April 1987, the station came under the control of JR West.

The station became an unstaffed station on 12 March 2022.

== Passenger statistics ==
In fiscal 2015, the station was used by an average of 1,300 passengers daily (boarding passengers only).

== Surrounding area ==
- Komatsu College
- Awazu onsen

== See also ==
- List of railway stations in Japan
