= Meihō Station =

Railway station in Komatsu, Ishikawa Prefecture, Japan

Meihō Station 明峰駅
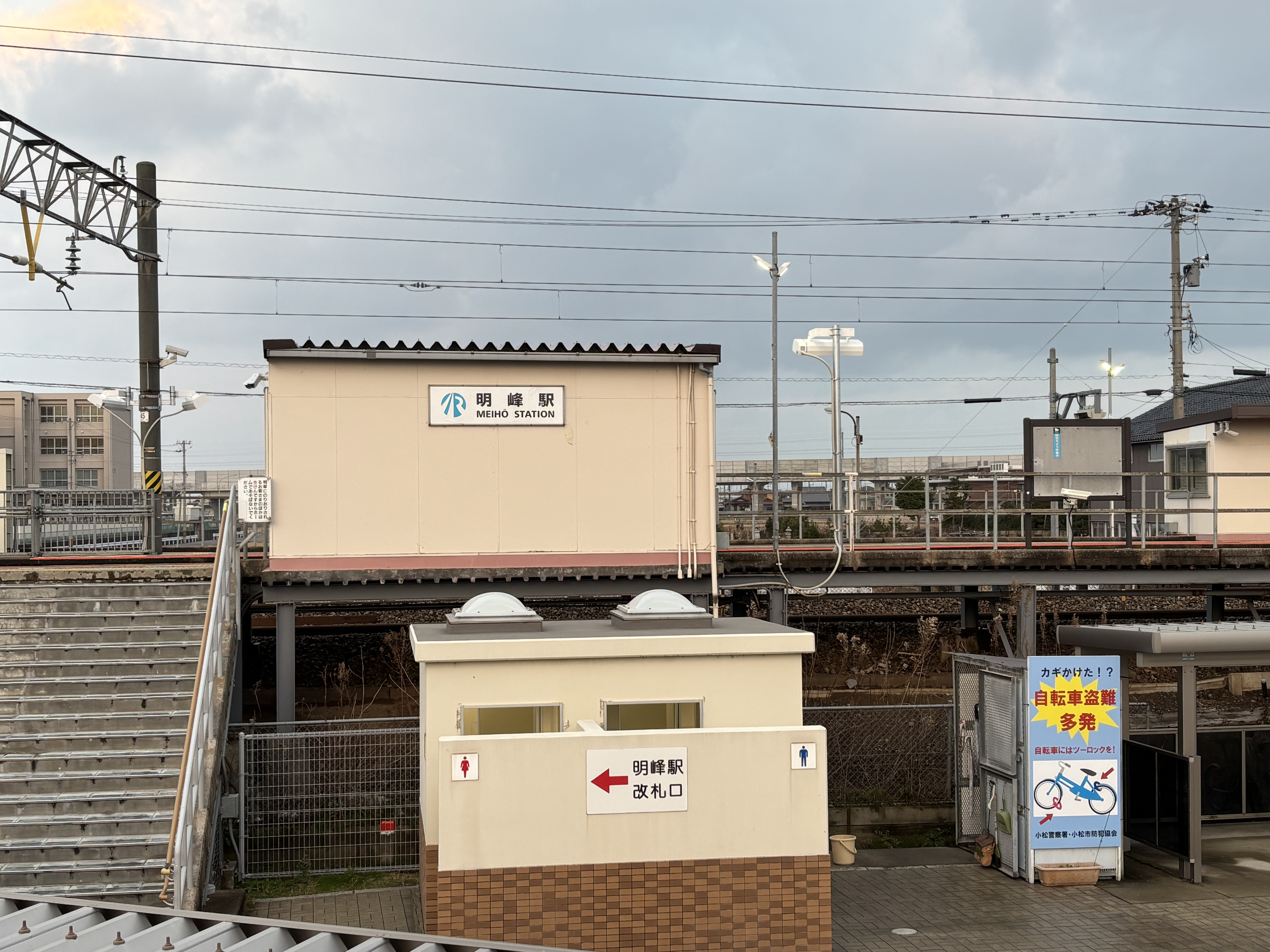
- Home

General information
- Location: 77 Matsunashi-machi, Komatsu-shi, Ishikawa-ken 923-0014; Japan
- Coordinates: 36.4255°N 136.4629°E
- Operator: IR Ishikawa Railway
- Line: ■ IR Ishikawa Railway Line
- Distance: 150.0 km from Maibara
- Platforms: 2 side platforms
- Tracks: 2

Construction
- Structure type: Ground level

Other information
- Status: Unstaffed
- Website: Official website

History
- Opened: 1 October 1988

Passengers
- FY2015: 486
Location
- Location within Japan

Meihō Station (明峰駅, Meihō-eki) is a railway station on the Hokuriku Main Line in the city of Komatsu, Ishikawa, Japan, operated by IR Ishikawa Railway.

== Lines ==
Meihō Station is served by the IR Ishikawa Railway Line.

== Station layout ==
The station consists of two opposed unnumbered side platforms connected by a level crossing. The station is unattended.

=== Platforms ===
Station side	■ IR Ishikawa Railway Line	for Fukui and Tsuruga
Opposite side	■ IR Ishikawa Railway Line	for Komatsu and Kanazawa

== Adjacent stations ==
«	Service	»
IR Ishikawa Railway Line
Komatsu	Local	Nomi-Neagari

== History ==
Meihō Station opened on 10 October 1988 on the JR West Hokuriku Main Line.

On 16 March 2024, the station came under the aegis of the IR Ishikawa Railway due to the extension of the Hokuriku Shinkansen from Kanazawa to Tsuruga.

== Surrounding area ==
- Komatsu Kita High School
- Komatsu Meihō School

== See also ==
- List of railway stations in Japan
