= IR Ishikawa Railway =

Japanese railway company

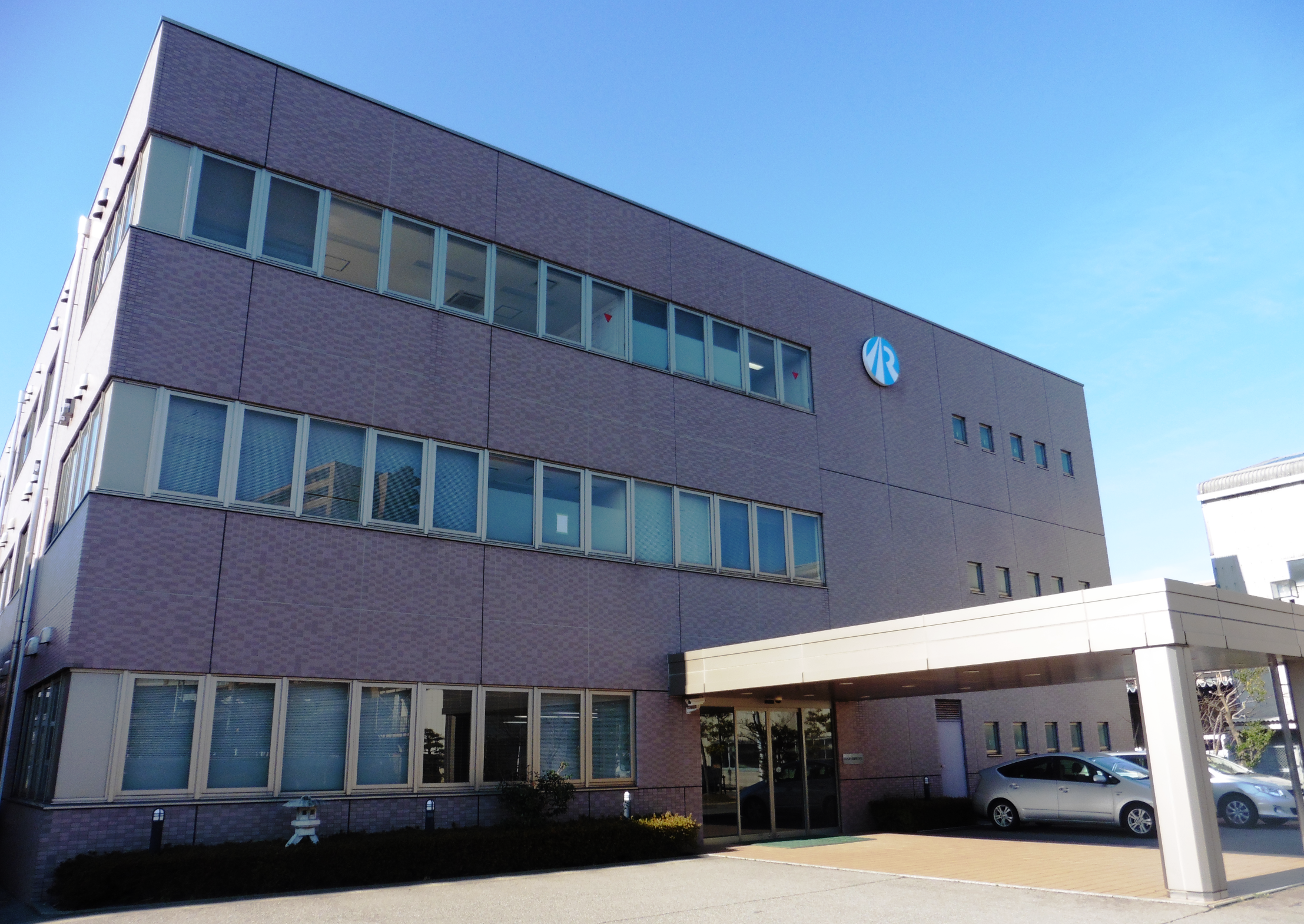
- Company headquarters
- Native name: IRいしかわ鉄道
- Company type: Third sector
- Genre: Rail transport
- Founded: 28 August 2012
- Headquarters: Kanazawa, Ishikawa, Japan
- Area served: Ishikawa Prefecture
- Services: Passenger railway
- Website: ishikawa-railway.jp

IR Ishikawa Railway (IRいしかわ鉄道株式会社, IR Ishikawa Tetsudō Kabushiki-gaisha) is a Japanese third-sector railway company established on 28 August 2012 to operate passenger railway services on the portion of the JR West Hokuriku Main Line within Ishikawa Prefecture. Services were transferred to IR Ishikawa Railway in two parts, corresponding with successive extensions of the Hokuriku Shinkansen. The company headquarters are in Kanazawa, Ishikawa.

On 14 March 2015, the Hokuriku Shinkansen extension from Nagano to Kanazawa opened and the Hokuriku Main Line between Naoetsu and Kanazawa was separated from the JR West network, with IR Ishikawa Railway acquiring the section between Kanazawa and Kurikara.

On 16 March 2024, the Kanazawa to Tsuruga extension of the Hokuriku Shinkansen opened, with IR Ishikawa Railway acquiring the Daishōji to Kanazawa section of the Hokuriku Main Line.

== Shareholders ==
Shares in the company are owned by Ishikawa Prefecture, the cities of Kanazawa and Komatsu, the town of Tsubata, and private-sector businesses.

== IR Ishikawa Railway Line ==
IR Ishikawa Railway Line
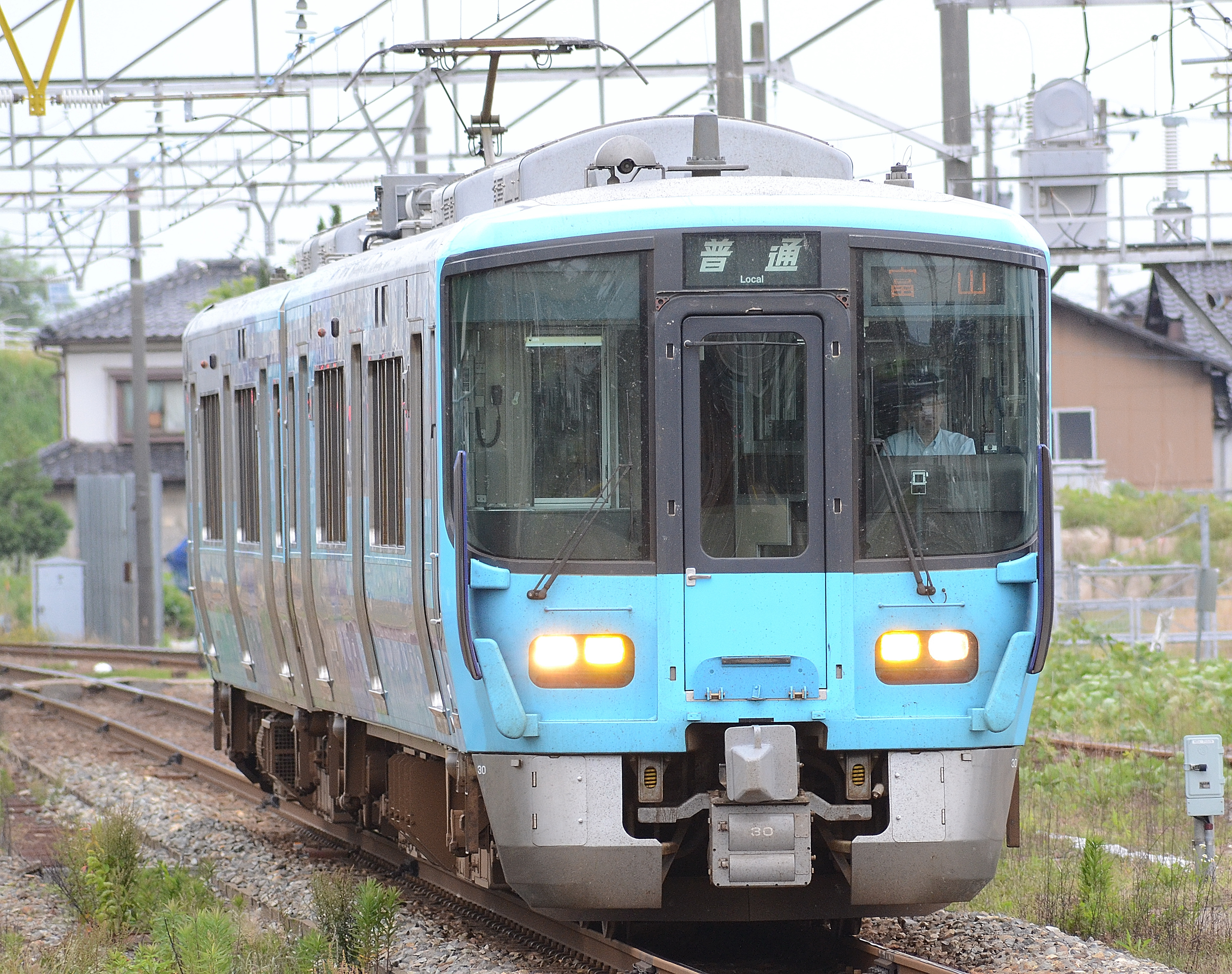
- A 521 series at Tsubata Station

Overview
- Native name: IRいしかわ鉄道線
- Owner: IR Ishikawa Railway
- Locale: Ishikawa Prefecture
- Termini: Daishoji; Kurikara
- Stations: 19
- Website: http://ishikawa-railway.jp/

Service
- Type: Regional rail
- Rolling stock: 521 series EMUs

History
- Opened: 1 November 1898

Technical
- Line length: 64.2 km (39.9 mi)
- Track gauge: 1,067 mm (3 ft 6 in)
- Electrification: 20 kV AC (60 Hz)

From 14 March 2015, IR Ishikawa Railway took over control of local passenger operations on the 17.8 km (11.1 mi) section JR West Hokuriku Main Line between Kanazawa and Kurikara, with five stations (although Kanazawa Station remains under the control of JR West). An additional 46.4 km (28.8 mi) section west to Daishoji with 14 stations was acquired from 16 March 2024.

=== Service outline ===
Train services are generally operated in two sections:

- Daishoji to Kanazawa
- Kanazawa to Tsubata & Kurikara

Through services are operated at both ends of the line.

At the western end of the line at Daishoji, most trains operate through service to/from Fukui on the Hapi-Line Fukui Line.

At the eastern end of the line, all trains (other than a small number of weekday peak hour trips terminating at Tsubata) operate through service either:

- At Tsubata: to/from Nanao on the JR West Nanao Line; OR
- At Kurikara: to/from Toyama & Ichiburi on the Ainokaze Toyama Railway Line

Limited-stop "Rapid" services named Ainokaze Liner (あいの風ライナー) are operated between Kanazawa and Tomari by Ainokaze Toyama Railway during the weekday morning and evening peaks, but these do not serve any IR Ishikawa Railway stations other than Kanazawa.

Limited Express Noto Kagaribi (Kanazawa - Wakuraonsen) services also operate over the section of the line between Kanazawa and Tsubata, with two of the Kanazawa-bound services stopping at Tsubata.

See #Limited Express trains for details of previously operated Limited Express trains.

=== Stations ===
All stations are in Ishikawa Prefecture.

==== Legend ====
● - All Rapid or Ainokaze liner trains stop
| - All Rapid or Ainokaze liner trains pass

Station	Japanese	Distance (km)	Rapid	Liner	Transfers	Location
↑ Through service to/from Fukui on the Hapi-Line Fukui Line ↑
Daishōji	大聖寺	0.0	●		Hapi-Line Fukui Line	Kaga
Kagaonsen	加賀温泉	4.1	●		Hokuriku Shinkansen	Kaga
Iburihashi	動橋	7.3	●			Kaga
Awazu	粟津	12.2	●			Komatsu
Komatsu	小松	18.0	●		Hokuriku Shinkansen	Komatsu
Meihō	明峰	20.8	|			Komatsu
Nomi-Neagari	能美根上	23.8	●			Nomi
Komaiko	小舞子	26.8	|			Hakusan
Mikawa	美川	28.6	|			Hakusan
Kaga-Kasama	加賀笠間	32.6	|			Hakusan
Nishi-Matto	西松任	35.1	|			Hakusan
Mattō	松任	37.0	●			Hakusan
Nonoichi	野々市	40.3	|			Nonoichi
Nishi-Kanazawa	西金沢	42.7	|			Kanazawa
Kanazawa	金沢	46.4	●	●	Hokuriku Shinkansen; Hokuriku Railroad Asanogawa Line (Hokutetsu-Kanazawa)	Kanazawa
Kanazawa Freight Terminal	金沢貨物ターミナル	49.0		|		Kanazawa
Higashi-Kanazawa	東金沢	49.0		|		Kanazawa
Morimoto	森本	51.8		|		Kanazawa
Tsubata	津幡	57.9		|	Nanao Line	Tsubata
↓ Through service to/from Nanao on the JR West Nanao Line ↓
Kurikara	倶利伽羅	64.2		|	Ainokaze Toyama Railway Line	Tsubata
↓ Through service to/from Toyama & Ichiburi on the Ainokaze Toyama Railway Line ↓

== Rolling stock ==
Some content in this section is translated and summarised from the existing Japanese Wikipedia article at ja:京都市営地下鉄; see its history for attribution.

As of 1 October 2024, the company operates a fleet of 24 two-car 521 series EMU trainsets (48 cars) numbered IR01-IR24. Trains were manufactured by Kinki Sharyo and Kawasaki Heavy Industries and are normally operated as two- or four-car formations.

Set Numbers	Series	Entered service	No. of sets
IR01-IR05	521-0	14 March 2015	5
IR06-IR08	521-100	3 December 2020	3
IR09-IR24	521-0	16 March 2024	16
		Total:	24

=== History ===
==== From 14 March 2015 (opening of Hokuriku Shinkansen extension from Nagano to Kanazawa) ====
For operation of the Kanazawa to Kurikawa section from 14 March 2015, five two-car 521 series trainsets - three second-batch sets (10, 14, and 30) were transferred from JR West, and two third-batch sets (55 and 56) were newly built. The two new sets were initially delivered in February 2015 in standard JR West livery but were repainted into the IR Ishikawa Railway livery before entering service.

As of 1 April 2015, the 521 series fleet is as follows.

Set no.	Former JR West set no.	Batch	Manufacturer	Delivery date	Livery accent colour
521-0 series
IR01	10	2nd batch	Kinki Sharyo	22 December 2009	■ Light green
IR02	14	2nd batch	Kinki Sharyo	2 March 2010	■ Purple
IR03	30	2nd batch	Kawasaki Heavy Industries	15 February 2011	■ Indigo
IR04	55	3rd batch	Kinki Sharyo	6 February 2015	■ Ochre
IR05	56	3rd batch	Kinki Sharyo	6 February 2015	■ Maroon

==== From 3 December 2020 ====
Three newly built 2-car 521 series trains were acquired in conjunction with JR West introducing 521 series trains on the Nanao Line, as the Nanao Line operates a through service on the IR Ishikawa Railway Line to/from Kanazawa.

These sets were built for JR West but delivered to IR Ishikawa Railway and became set numbers IR06-IR08.

Set no.	Manufacturer	Delivery date
521-100 series
IR06	Kinki Sharyo	3 December 2020
IR07	Kinki Sharyo	3 December 2020
IR08	Kinki Sharyo	3 December 2020

==== From 16 March 2024 (opening of Hokuriku Shinkansen extension from Kanazawa to Tsuruga) ====
For operation of the Daishōji to Kanazawa section, 16 two-car 521 series trains were transferred from JR West. These were numbered IR09-IR24.

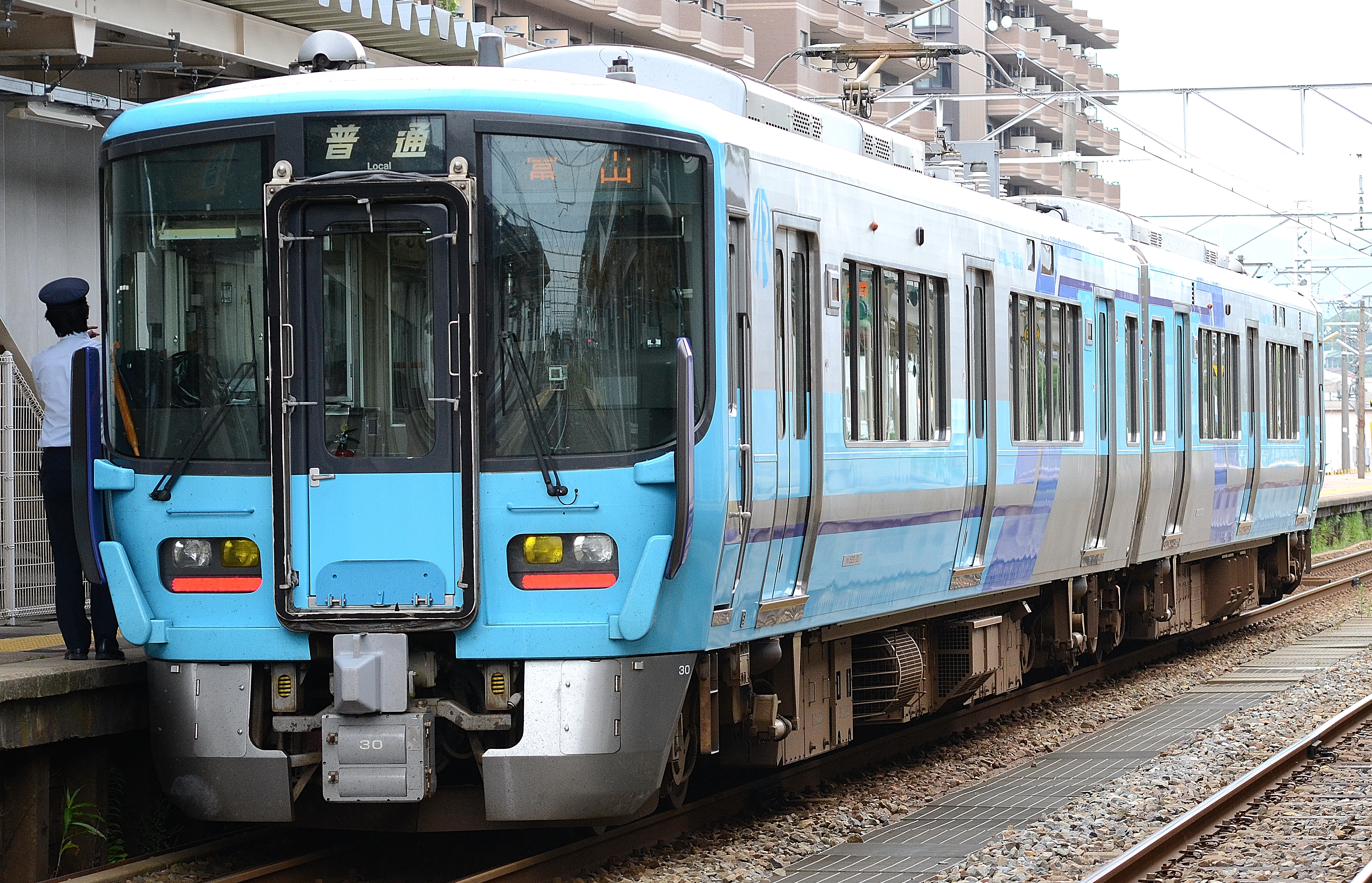
IR Ishikawa 521-0 series EMU set IR03, June 2015

== Limited Express trains ==
=== From 14 March 2015 (opening of Hokuriku Shinkansen extension from Nagano to Kanazawa) ===
Thunderbird Limited Express services from Osaka prior to this date ran as far as Toyama (14 round trips per day) & Uozu (1 round trip per day) on the Hokuriku Main Line and Wakuraonsen on the Nanao Line (4 round trips per day). From this date Thunderbird services were truncated to only operate between Osaka and Kanazawa, except for one daily round trip to Wakuraonsen.

Noto Kagaribi Limited Express services between Kanazawa and Wakuraonsen commenced operation on this date (5 round trips per day) to compensate for removal of all but one of the Thunderbird services to Wakuraonsen. These operate over the section of the line between Kanazawa and Tsubata, with two of the Kanazawa-bound services stopping at Tsubata. On 12 March 2022, one round trip was removed reducing the number of round trips per day from five to four.

=== From 16 March 2024 (opening of Hokuriku Shinkansen extension from Kanazawa to Tsuruga) ===
All Thunderbird services from this date were truncated to operate between Osaka and Tsuruga only (25 round trips per day).

Noto Kagaribi Limited Express services between Kanazawa and Wakuraonsen continue to operate on the IR Ishikawa Railway Line and have been increased from four to five daily round trips in lieu of the removed Thunderbird round trip to Wakuraonsen.

== History ==
The line eastward from Kanazawa was opened on 1 November 1898 on the Hokuriku Main Line. With the privatization of JNR on 1 April 1987, the line came under the control of JR West.

The new third-sector operating company was founded on 28 August 2012 and was renamed IR Ishikawa Railway from 1 August 2013. The company was formally granted a railway operating license by the Ministry of Land, Infrastructure, Transport and Tourism on 28 February 2014.

Effective the timetable revision that took place on 16 March 2024, the section of the Hokuriku Main Line from Kanazawa Station to Daishoji Station was transferred from JR West to IR Ishikawa Railway. The line has been running between Daishoji and Kurikara effective the same date.

== See also ==
- List of railway companies in Japan
- List of railway lines in Japan
