= Tomari Station =

Tomari Station (泊駅) is the name of three train stations in Japan:

- Tomari Station (Mie)
- Tomari Station (Toyama)
- Tomari Station (Tottori)
