= Komatsu Station =

Railway station in Komatsu, Ishikawa Prefecture, Japan

Komatsu Station 小松駅
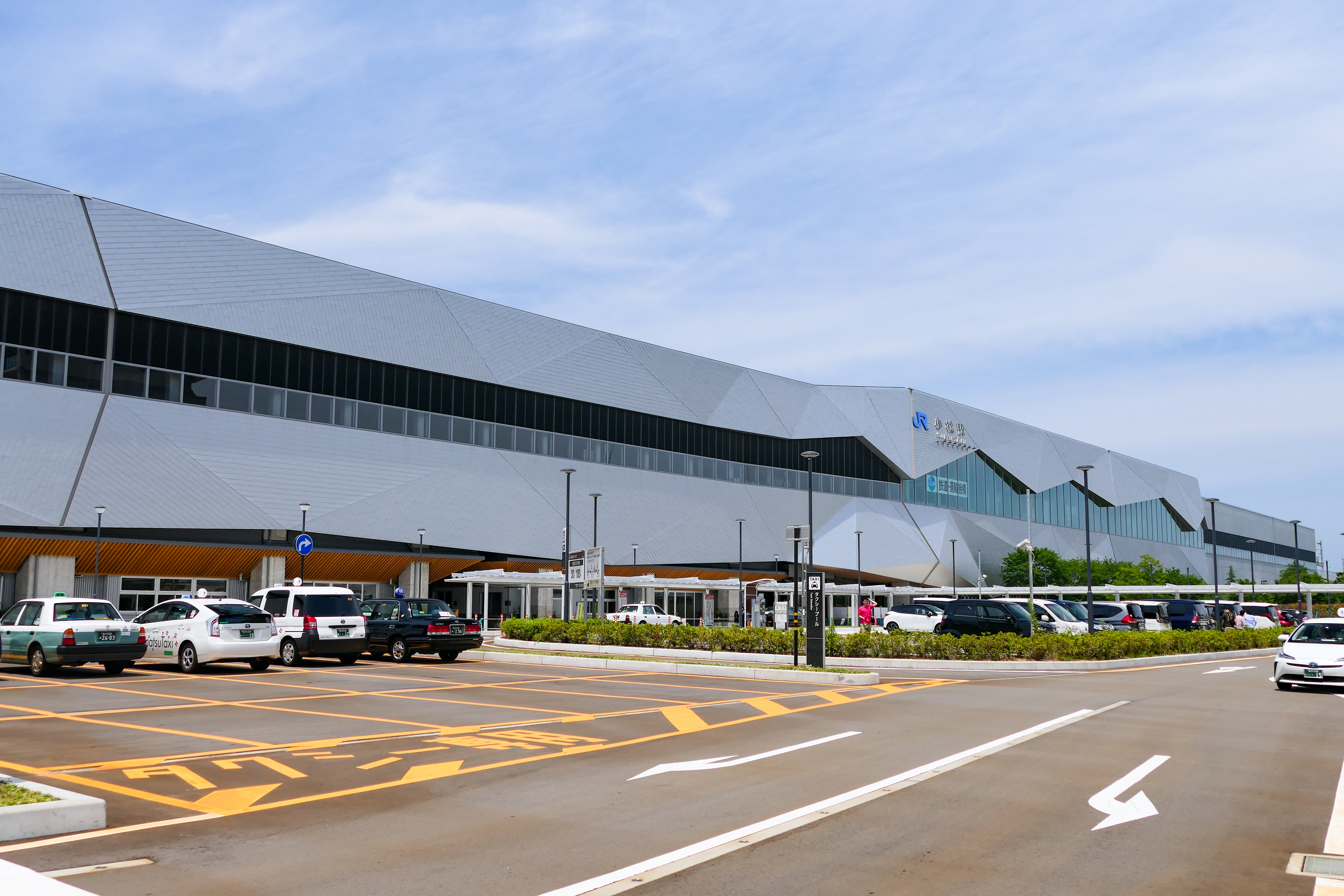
- Komatsu Station east side in June 2023

General information
- Location: 466 Doihara-machi, Komatsu-shi, Ishikawa-ken 923-0921; Japan
- Coordinates: 36.4022698°N 136.452781°E
- Operator: JR West; IR Ishikawa Railway
- Lines: Hokuriku Shinkansen; IR Ishikawa Railway Line
- Distance: 18.0 km from Daishōji
- Platforms: 1 side + 1 island platform
- Tracks: 3

Other information
- Status: Staffed (Midori no Madoguchi)
- Website: Official website

History
- Opened: 20 September 1897; 129 years ago

Passengers
- FY2015: 4002 daily

Services
| Preceding station | JR West | Following station |
|---|---|---|
| Kaga-Onsen towards Tsuruga | Hokuriku Shinkansen Kagayaki | Kanazawa towards Nagano |
| Kaga-Onsen towards Tsuruga | Hokuriku Shinkansen Hakutaka | Kanazawa towards Jōetsumyōkō |
| Kaga-Onsen towards Tsuruga | Hokuriku Shinkansen Tsurugi | Kanazawa towards Toyama |
| Preceding station | IR Ishikawa Railway | Following station |
| Awazu towards Daishōji | IR Ishikawa Railway Line Rapid | Nomi-Neagari towards Kanazawa |
| Awazu towards Daishōji | IR Ishikawa Railway Line Local | Meihō towards Kurikara |
Location
- Location within Japan

Komatsu Station (小松駅, Komatsu-eki) is a railway station in the city of Komatsu, Ishikawa, Japan, operated by West Japan Railway Company (JR West) and IR Ishikawa Railway.

== Lines ==
Komatsu Station is served by the IR Ishikawa Railway Line, and is 18.0 kilometers from the start of the line at Daishōji. It became a station on the high-speed Hokuriku Shinkansen line when the extension west of Kanazawa opened on 16 March 2024.

== Station layout ==
The station consists of one elevated island platform and one elevated side platform with the station building underneath. The station has a Midori no Madoguchi staffed ticket office.

=== Platforms ===
| 1 | ■ IR Ishikawa Railway Line | for Kanazawa |
| 2 | ■ IR Ishikawa Railway Line | for Fukui and Tsuruga for Kanazawa |
| 3 | ■ IR Ishikawa Railway Line | for Fukui and Tsuruga |

| 11 | ■ Hokuriku Shinkansen | for Kanazawa, Tokyo |
| 12 | ■ Hokuriku Shinkansen | for Fukui and Tsuruga |

== History ==
Komatsu Station opened on 20 September 1897. With the privatization of Japanese National Railways (JNR) on 1 April 1987, the station came under the control of JR West.

Construction of the platforms serving the Hokuriku Shinkansen was completed in August 2022.

Effective the timetable revision on 16 March 2024, the Hokuriku Shinkansen began operations at the station while the facilities of the Hokuriku Main Line were transferred to the IR Ishikawa Railway.

== Passenger statistics ==
In fiscal 2015, the station was used by an average of 4,002 passengers daily (boarding passengers only).

== See also ==
- List of railway stations in Japan
