= Kanazawa Station =

Railway station in Kanazawa, Ishikawa Prefecture, Japan

Kanazawa Station 金沢駅
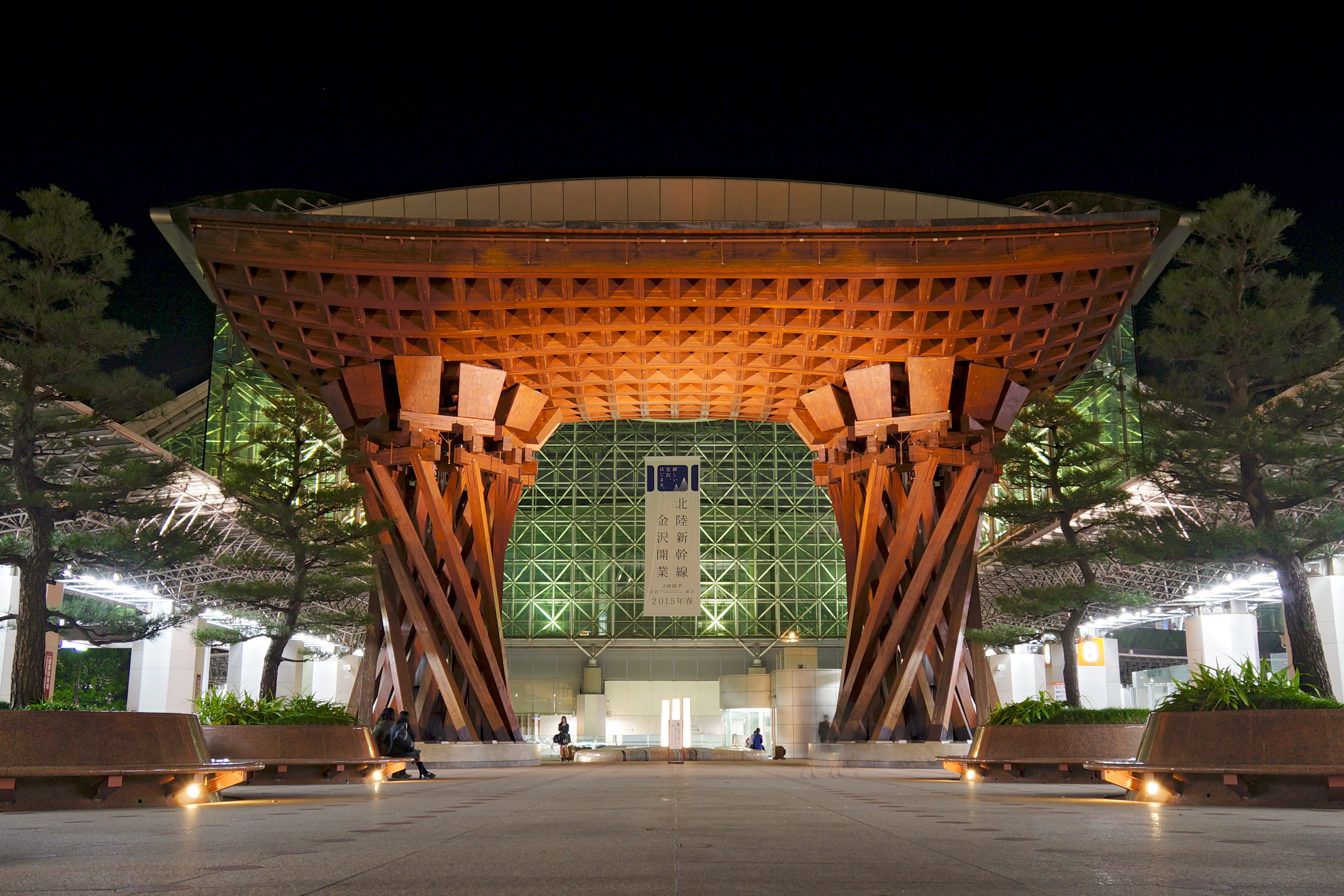
- The Tsuzumi ("drum") Gate at JR Kanazawa Station East entrance, designed by Rhyuzou Shirae

General information
- Location: 1-1 Kinoshimbo-machi, Kanazawa City, Ishikawa Prefecture 920-0858; Japan
- Coordinates: 36.578269°N 136.647762°E
- Operator: JR West; IR Ishikawa Railway; Hokuriku Railroad
- Lines: Hokuriku Shinkansen; ■ Nanao Line; IR Ishikawa Railway Line; ■ Hokutetsu Asanogawa Line (Hokutetsu-Kanazawa)
- Distance: 450.5 km from Tokyo
- Platforms: 5 island platforms
- Tracks: 7
- Connections: Bus terminal

Other information
- Status: Staffed (Midori no Madoguchi)
- Website: Official website

History
- Opened: 1 April 1898; 128 years ago

Passengers
- FY2024: 24,612 daily; 15,725 daily; 4,045 daily

Services
Preceding station	JR West	Following station
Komatsu towards Tsuruga	Hokuriku Shinkansen Kagayaki	Toyama towards Nagano
Komatsu towards Tsuruga	Hokuriku Shinkansen Hakutaka	Shin-Takaoka towards Jōetsumyōkō
Komatsu towards Tsuruga	Hokuriku Shinkansen Tsurugi	Shin-Takaoka towards Toyama
Preceding station	IR Ishikawa Railway	Following station
Mattō towards Daishōji	IR Ishikawa Railway Line Rapid	Terminus
Terminus	IR Ishikawa Railway Line Ainokaze Liner	Isurugi towards Tomari
Nishi-Kanazawa towards Daishōji	IR Ishikawa Railway Line Local	Higashi-Kanazawa towards Kurikara
Preceding station	Hokuriku Railroad	Following station
Terminus	Asanogawa Line	Nanatsuya towards Uchinada
Location
- Location within Ishikawa Prefecture Location within Chubu region Location within Japan

Kanazawa Station (金沢駅, Kanazawa-eki) is a major railway station in Kanazawa, Ishikawa, Japan, operated by West Japan Railway Company (JR West), the private railway operator Hokuriku Railroad, and the third-sector operator IR Ishikawa Railway.

Beneath a square in front of the JR station is Hokutetsu-Kanazawa Station, the terminal of the Hokuriku Railroad Asanogawa Line.

== Lines ==
- West Japan Railway Company (JR West):
  - Hokuriku Shinkansen
- IR Ishikawa Railway
  - IR Ishikawa Railway Line (including JR West's Nanao Line through trains)
- Hokuriku Railroad (Hokutetsu):
  - Asanogawa Line (Hokutetsu-Kanazawa Station)

== Station layout ==
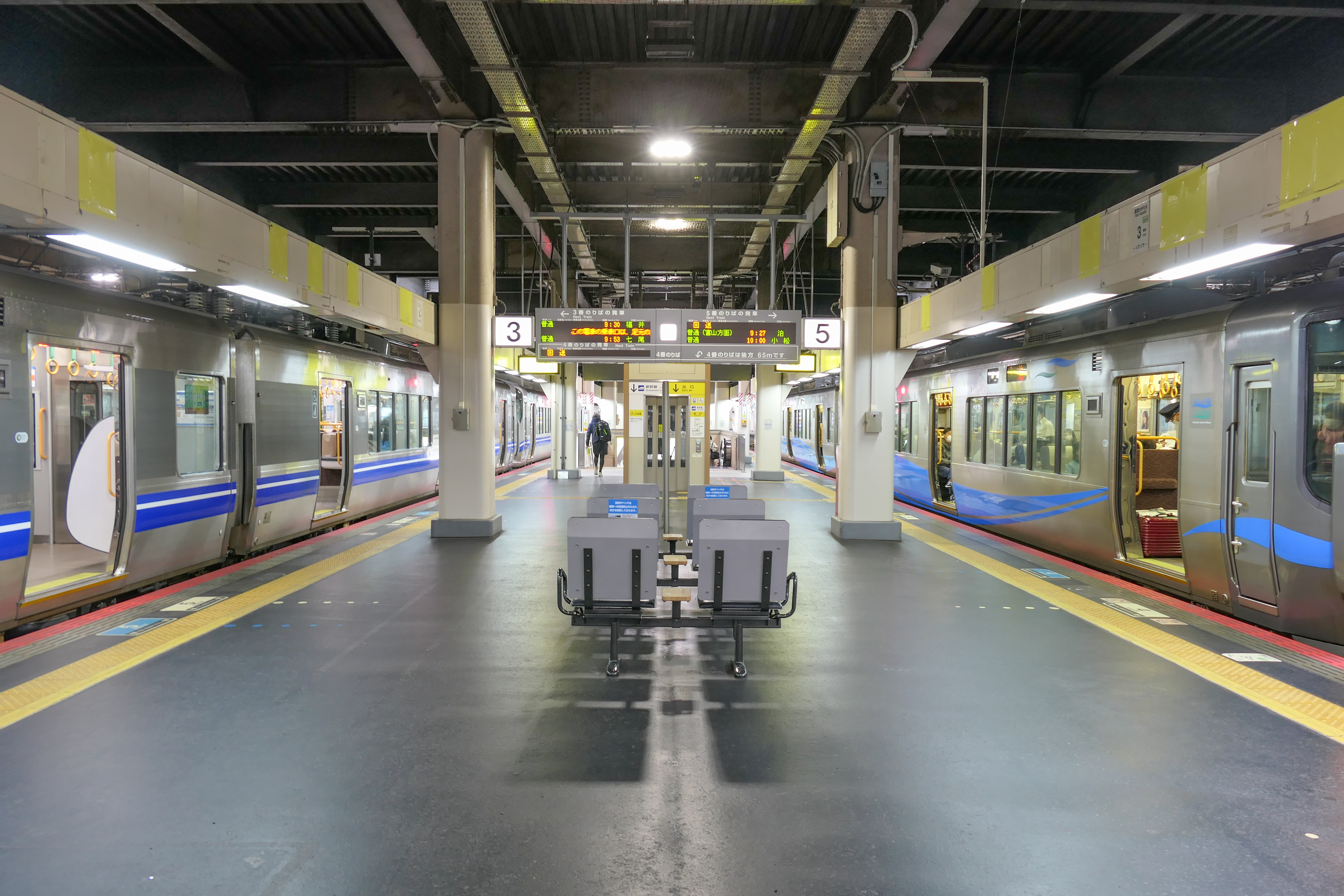
Platform 3 and 5, July 2022

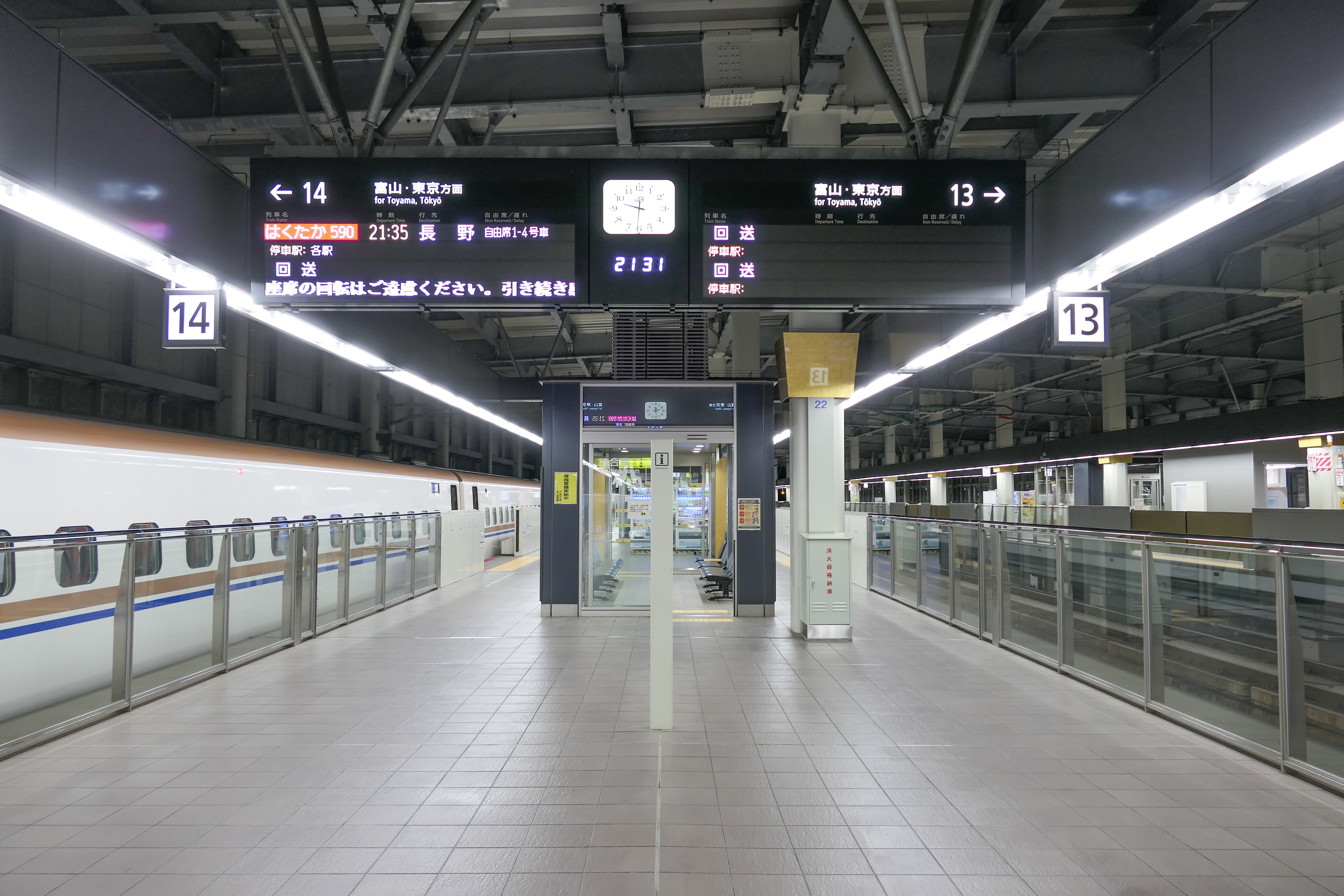
Platforms 13 and 14, July 2022

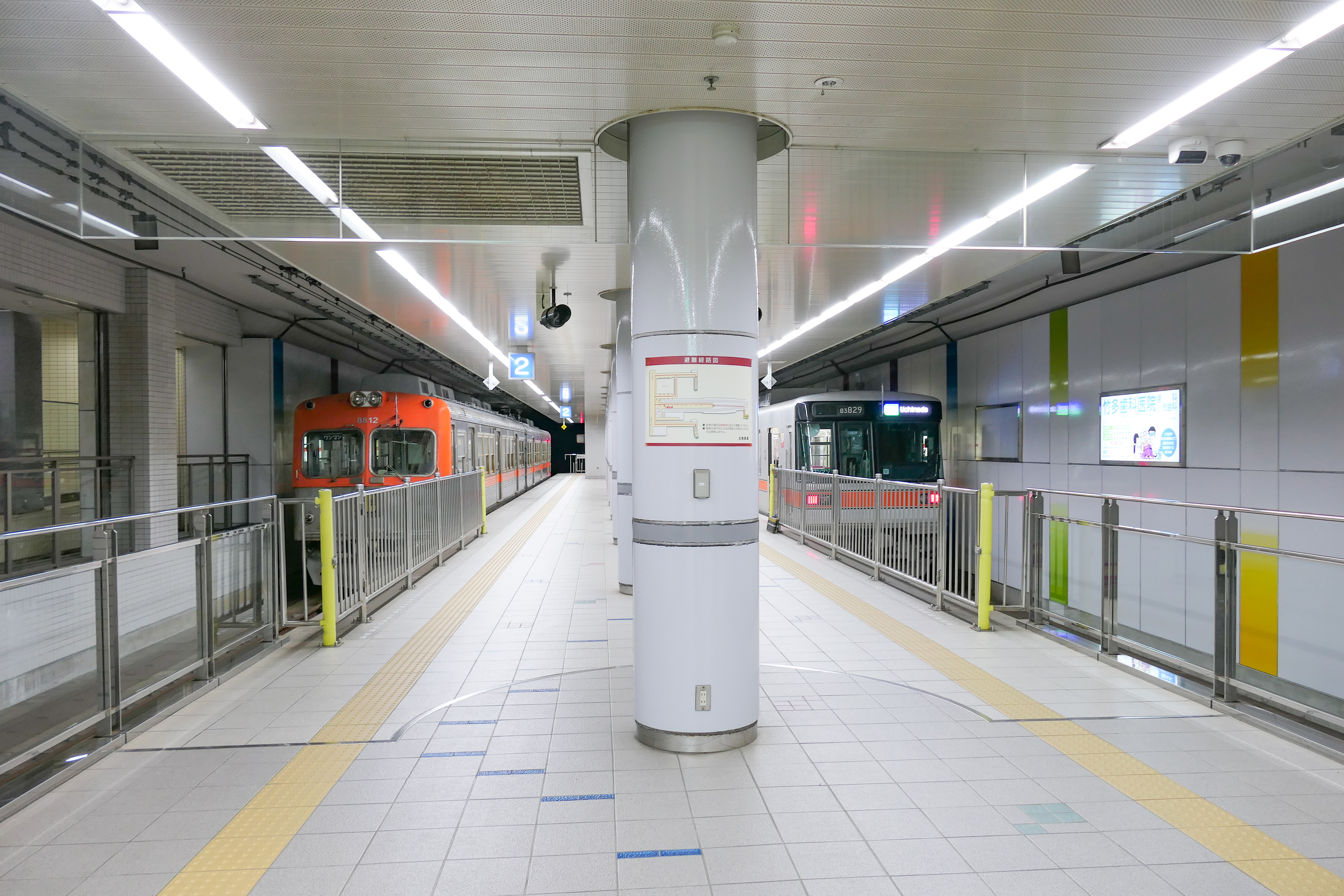
Hokutetsu platforms, April 2022

=== IR Ishikawa Railway platforms ===
IR Ishikawa Railway platforms are elevated above street level, featuring three island platforms with one cut-out platform (for Track 4) on the Up (Toyama) side of the middle island platform, serving seven tracks in total. A large roof covers the station building, in order to prevent train stoppages due to accumulated snow within the station.

1-2	■ IR Ishikawa Railway Line	for Komatsu, Fukui
3	■ IR Ishikawa Railway Line	for Komatsu, Fukui
3	■ Nanao Line	for Hakui, Nanao, Wakuraonsen
4	■ IR Ishikawa Railway Line	for Takaoka, Toyama
4	■ Nanao Line	for Hakui, Nanao, Wakuraonsen
5	■ IR Ishikawa Railway Line	for Komatsu, Fukui
5	■ IR Ishikawa Railway Line	for Takaoka, Toyama
5	■ Nanao Line	for Hakui, Nanao, Wakuraonsen
6-7	■ IR Ishikawa Railway Line	for Takaoka, Toyama
6-7	■ Nanao Line	for Hakui, Nanao, Wakuraonsen

=== JR (Hokuriku Shinkansen) platforms ===
The Hokuriku Shinkansen platforms are adjacent to the east exit, between the Motenashi Dome and the IR Ishikawa Railway tracks. The Shinkansen station has two island platforms serving four tracks.

11-12	■ Hokuriku Shinkansen	for Toyama, Nagano, Tokyo
13-14	■ Hokuriku Shinkansen	for Fukui, Tsuruga

The departure melody used on the Hokuriku Shinkansen platforms was composed by songwriter and producer Yasutaka Nakata, who was born in Kanazawa.

=== Hokutetsu platforms ===
The platforms for the Hokutetsu Asanogawa Line are located underground, below the JR West platforms.

1-2	■ Hokutetsu Asanogawa Line	for Uchinada

== History ==
The station opened on 1 April 1898. With the privatization of JNR on 1 April 1987, the station came under the control of JR West. The platforms for the Hokuriku Shinkansen opened on 14 March 2015.

From 14 March 2015, with the opening of the Hokuriku Shinkansen extension from Nagano, local passenger operations over sections of the Hokuriku Main Line running roughly parallel to the new shinkansen line were reassigned to different third-sector railway operating companies. From this date, Kanazawa Station became the western terminus of the IR Ishikawa Railway Line of Ishikawa Prefecture.

At the timetable revision effective 16 March 2024, the Hokuriku Shinkansen extended between Kanazawa and Tsuruga. All Thunderbird and Shirasagi limited express services were discontinued between Tsuruga and Kanazawa Stations. From the same date, the Hokuriku Main Line between Daishoji Station and Kanazawa Station was reorganized as the IR Ishikawa Railway Line, thus the former Hokuriku Main Line section of the station became exclusively used for the IR Ishikawa Railway Line including some through trains to the Nanao Line.

== Passenger statistics ==
In fiscal 2016, the JR West portion of the station (including the conventional line section later removed from the JR West operation) was used by an average of 22,668 passengers daily (boarding passengers only).

== Surrounding area ==
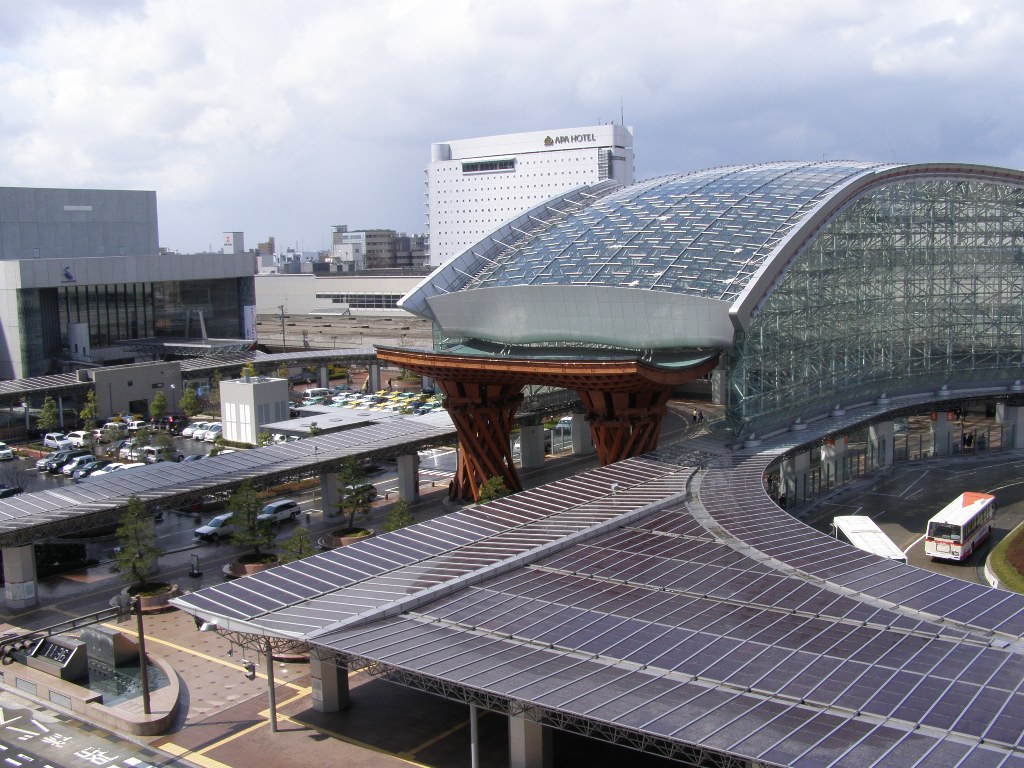
JR Kanazawa Station East entrance

=== East exit ===
- Kanazawa Station Bus Terminal
- Kanazawa Miyako Hotel
- Hotel Nikko Kanazawa
- Kanazawa Art Hall
- ANA Crowne Plaza Kanazawa
- Ishikawa Ongakudō

=== West exit ===
- JR Kanazawa Station West Building
  - Via Inn Kanazawa
- Kanazawa Manten Hotel
- Kanazawa Water and Energy Center

== Bus services ==
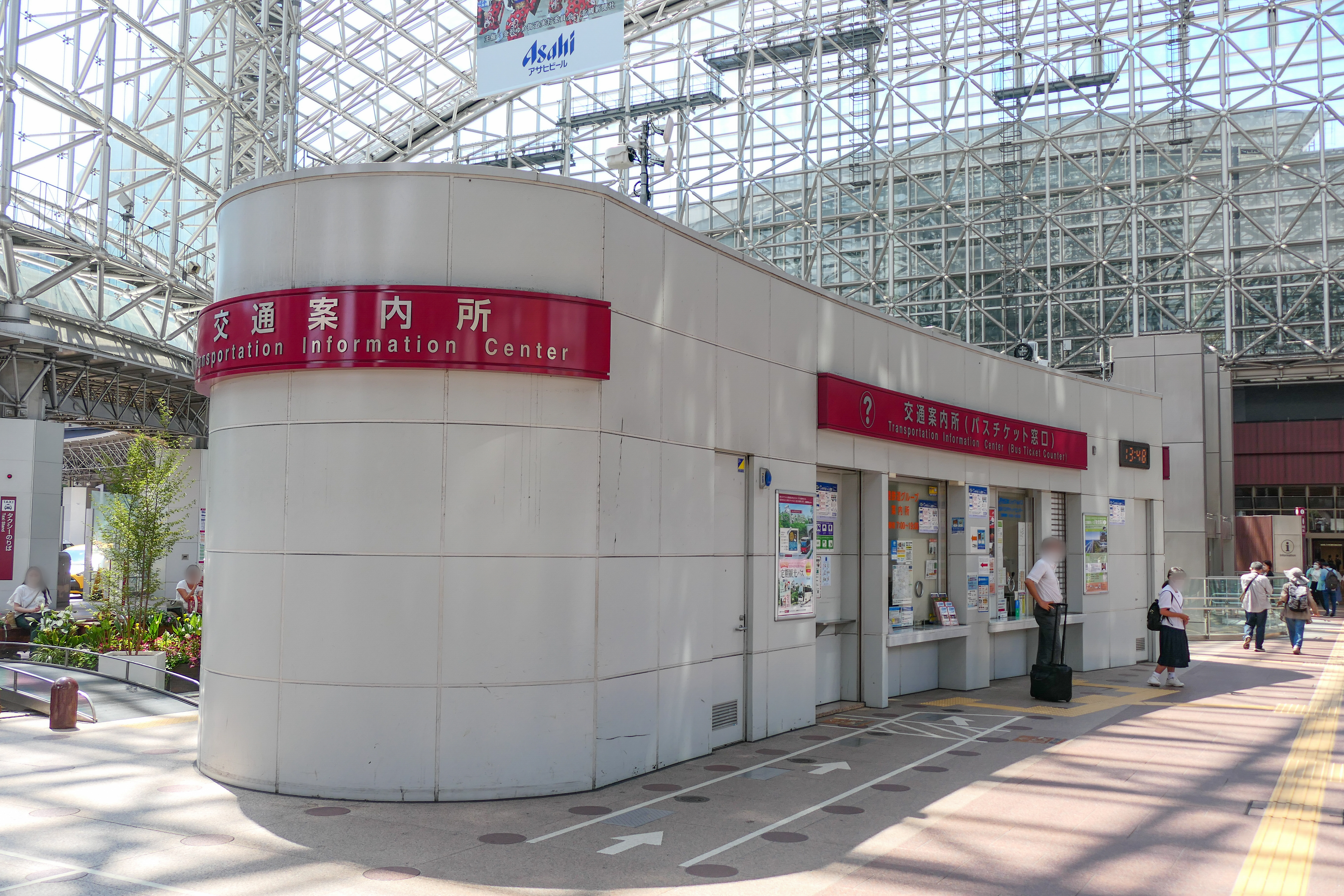
Transportation Information Center at east terminal

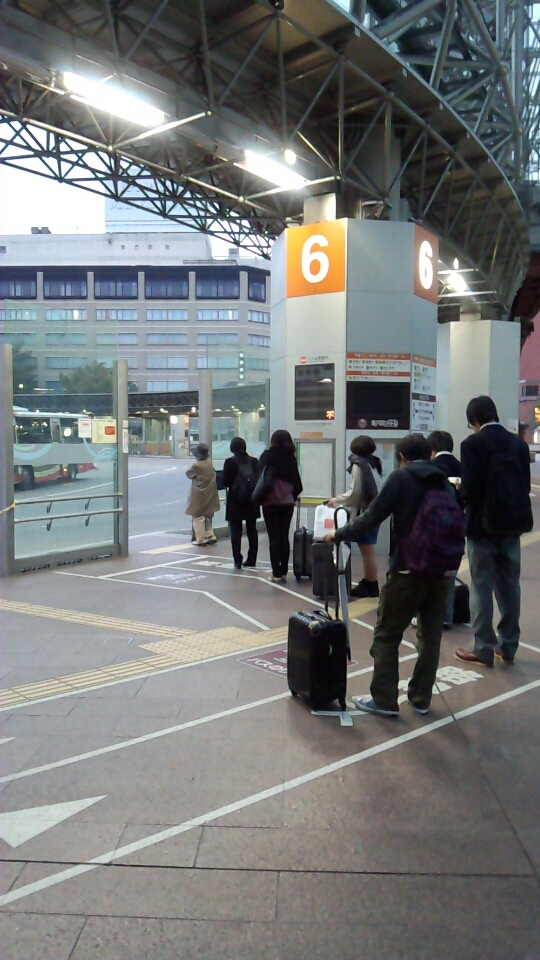
East terminal gate 6

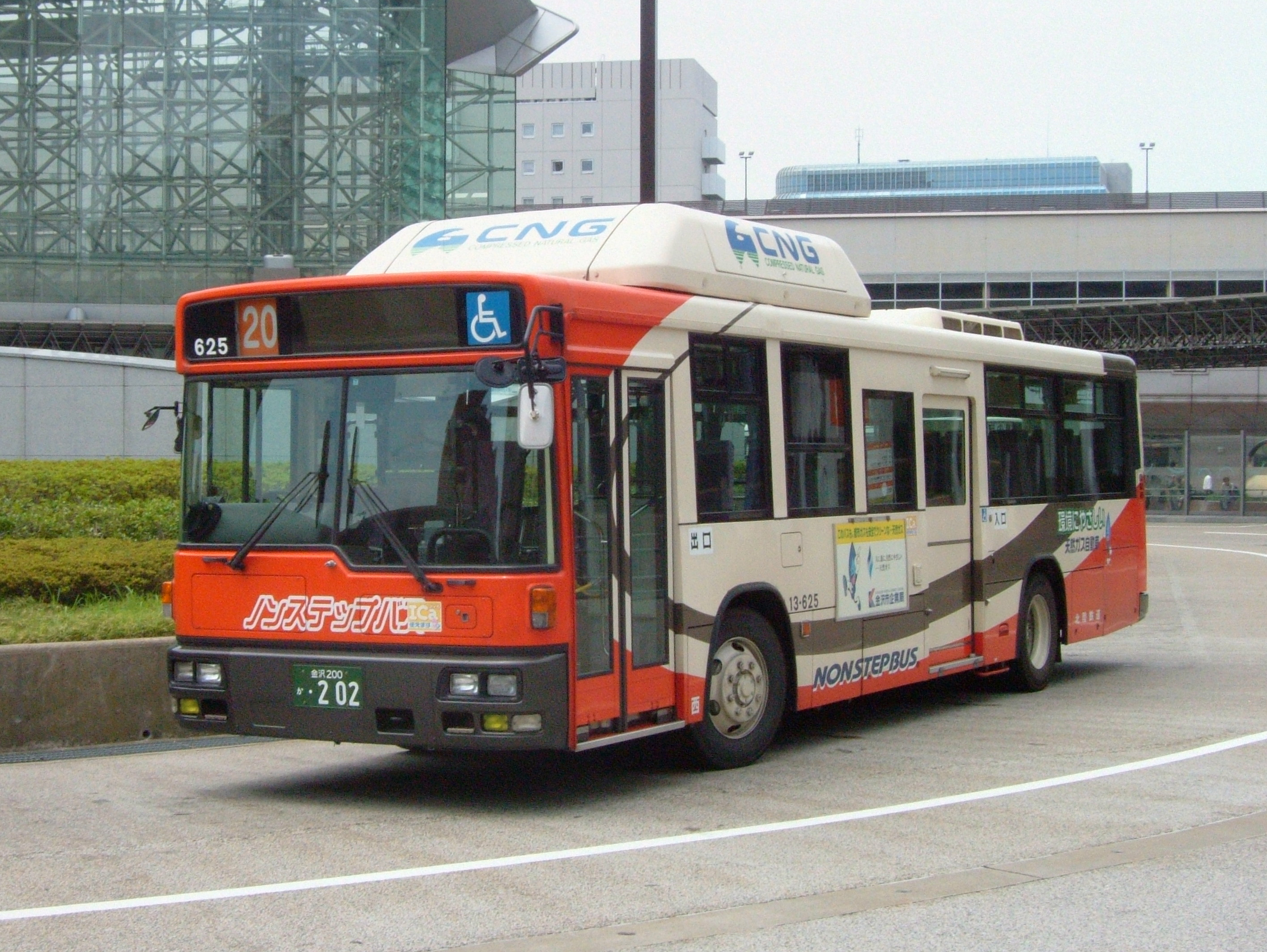
Hokutetsu route 20 bus

The bus terminals are located in both side of station. Almost all services to central Kanazawa including Kanazawa Loop Bus depart from east terminal, however some lines such as City Liner depart from west terminal. Most expressway bus stop was in east terminal but moved to west terminal in July 2023.

=== Expressway Bus ===
- Hokuriku-do Highway Bus for Nagoya (Jointly operated by Hokuriku Railroad, Meitetsu Bus, West Japan JR Bus and JR Tokai Bus)
- For Nagoya via Shirakawa-go (Jointly operated by Hokuriku Railroad and Meitetsu Bus)
- For Kyoto and Osaka (Operated by West Japan JR Bus)
- For Sendai (Operated by JR Bus Tohoku)
- For Niigata (Jointly operated by Hokuriku Railroad and Niigata Kotsu)
- For Shirakawa-go and Takayama (Jointly operated by Hokuriku Railroad and Nohi Bus)
- For Komatsu Airport (Operated by Hokuriku Railroad)
- For Wajima (Operated by Hokutetsu Okunoto Bus)
- For Suzu (Operated by Hokutetsu Okunoto Bus)
- Kimasshi-go for Tokyo (Operated by Kitanippon Kanko Bus)
- For Kyoto and Osaka (Jointly operated by Kitanippon Kanko Bus and Kintetsu Bus)

=== Local Bus ===
- Hokutetsu Bus
  - Kanazawa Loop Bus
- West Japan JR Bus
- Kanazawa Furatto Bus Konohana route

== Gallery ==
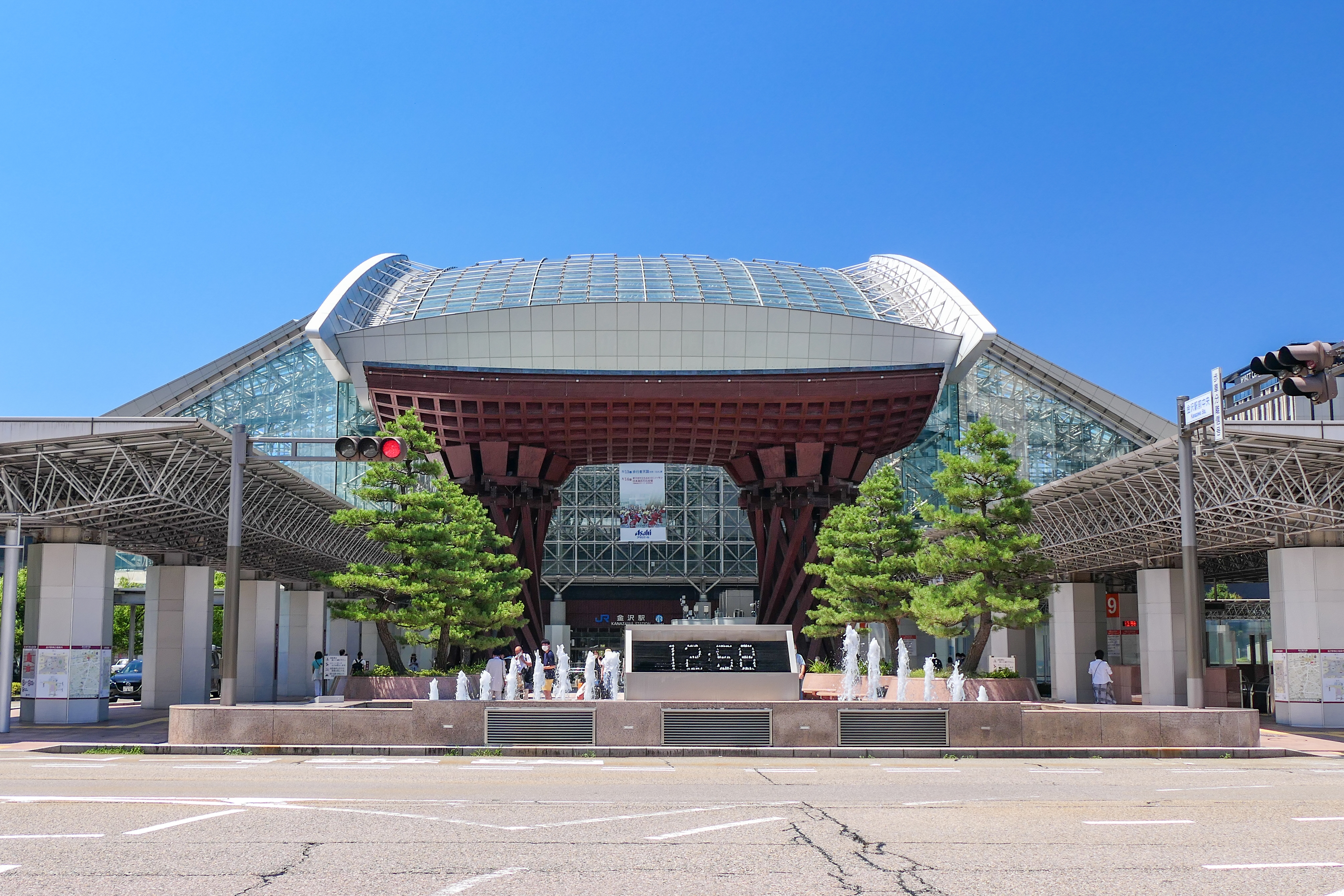
Station entrance exterior

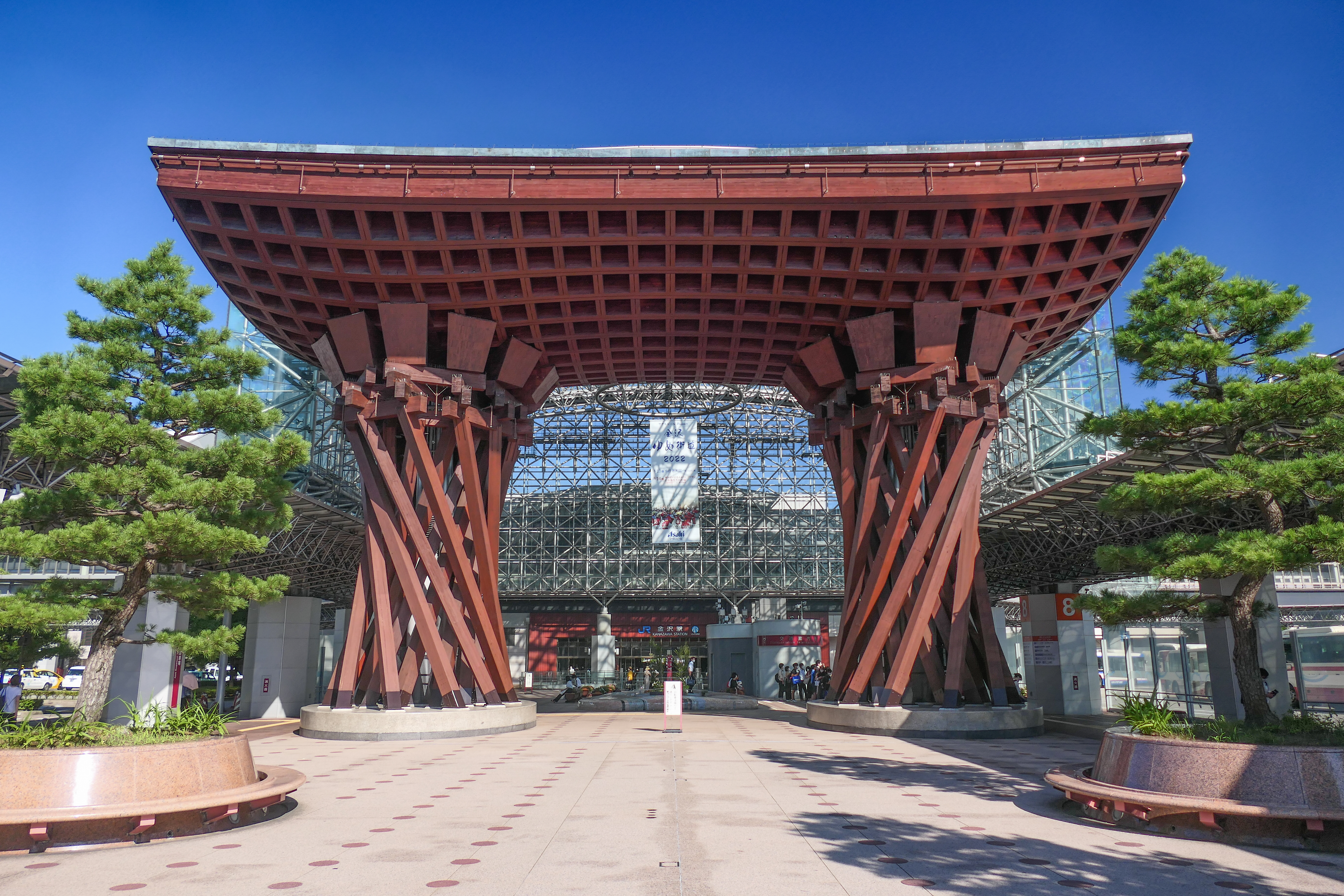
Drum gate, July 2022

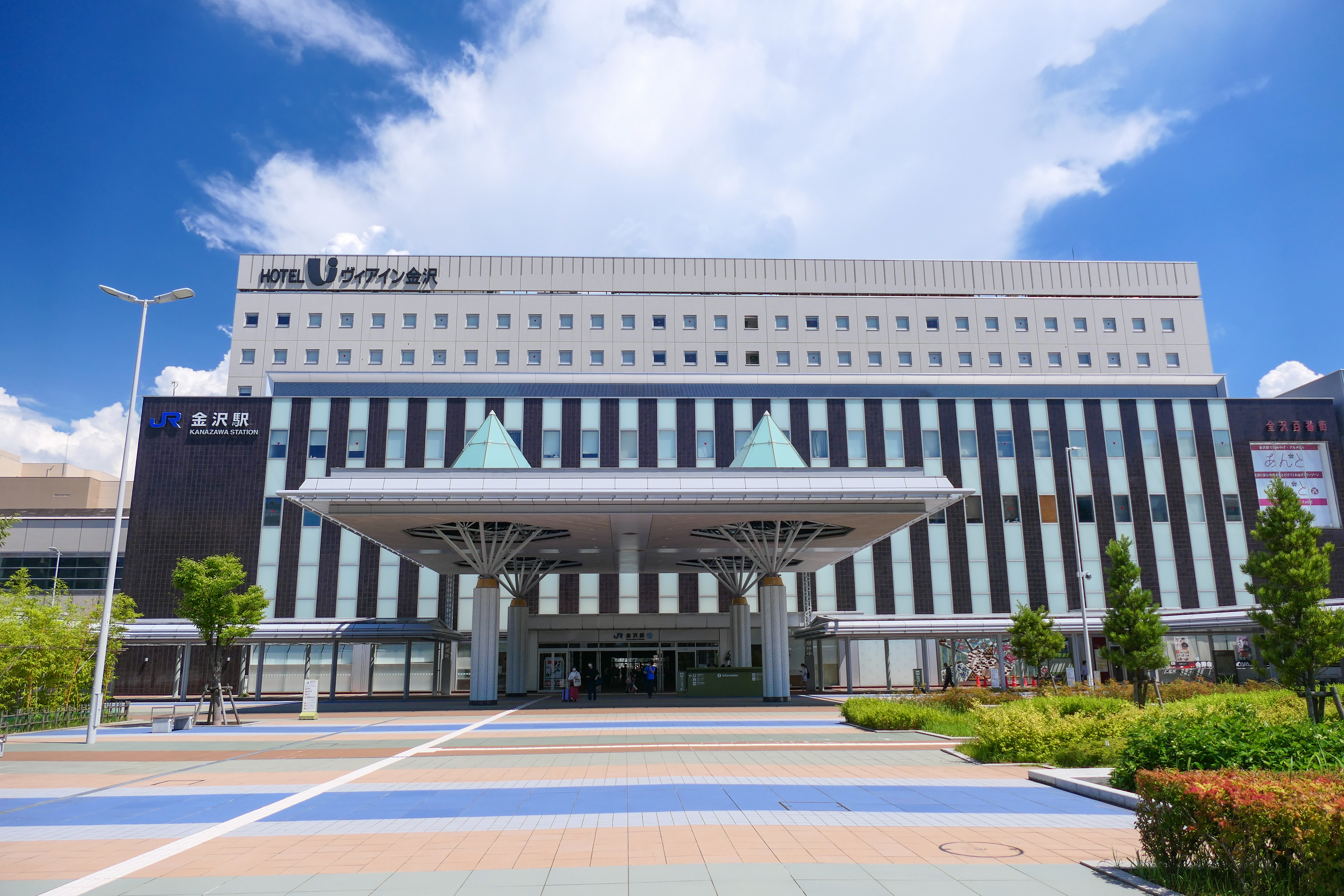
Kanazawa Port Exit, July 2022

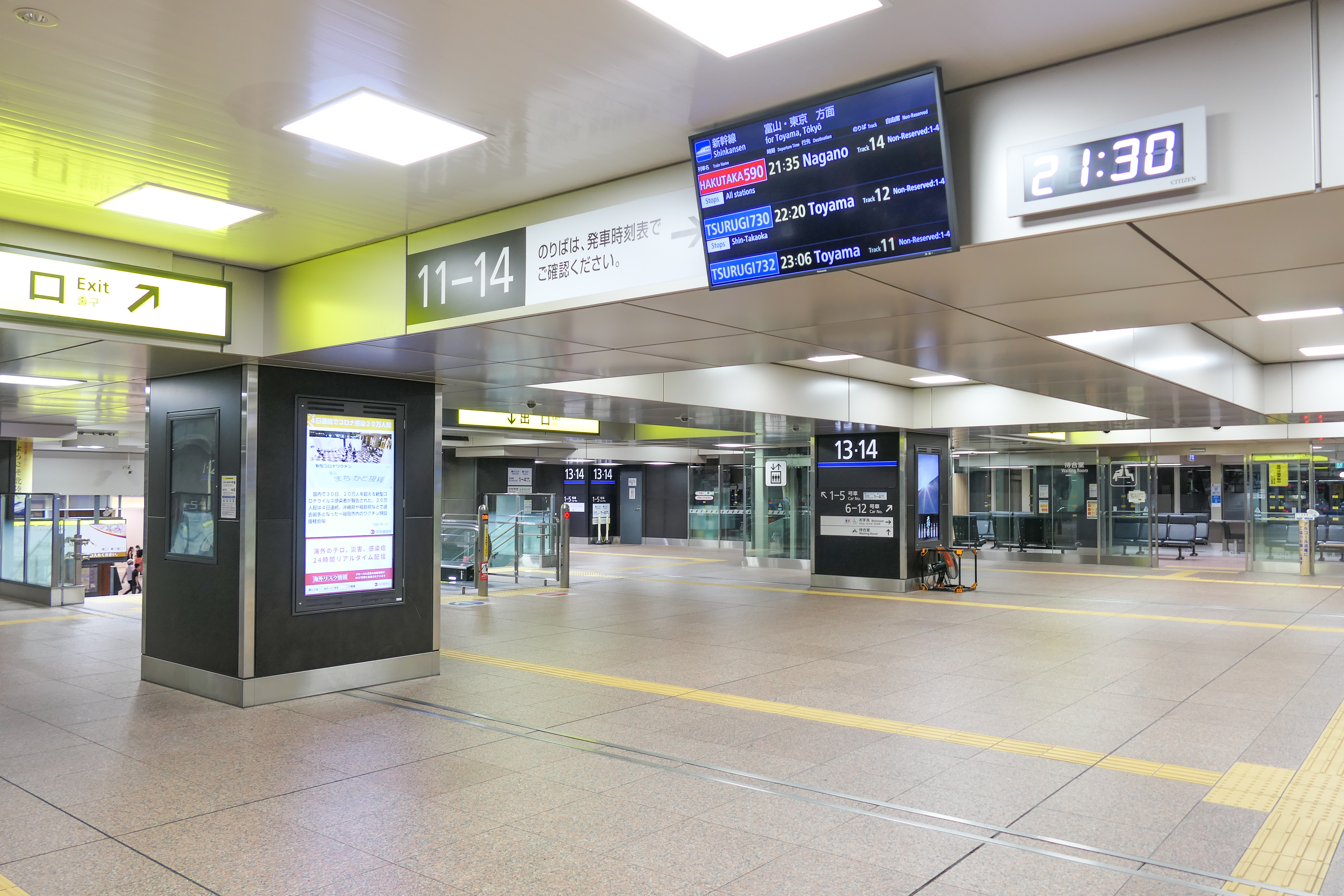
Shinkansen concourse, July 2022

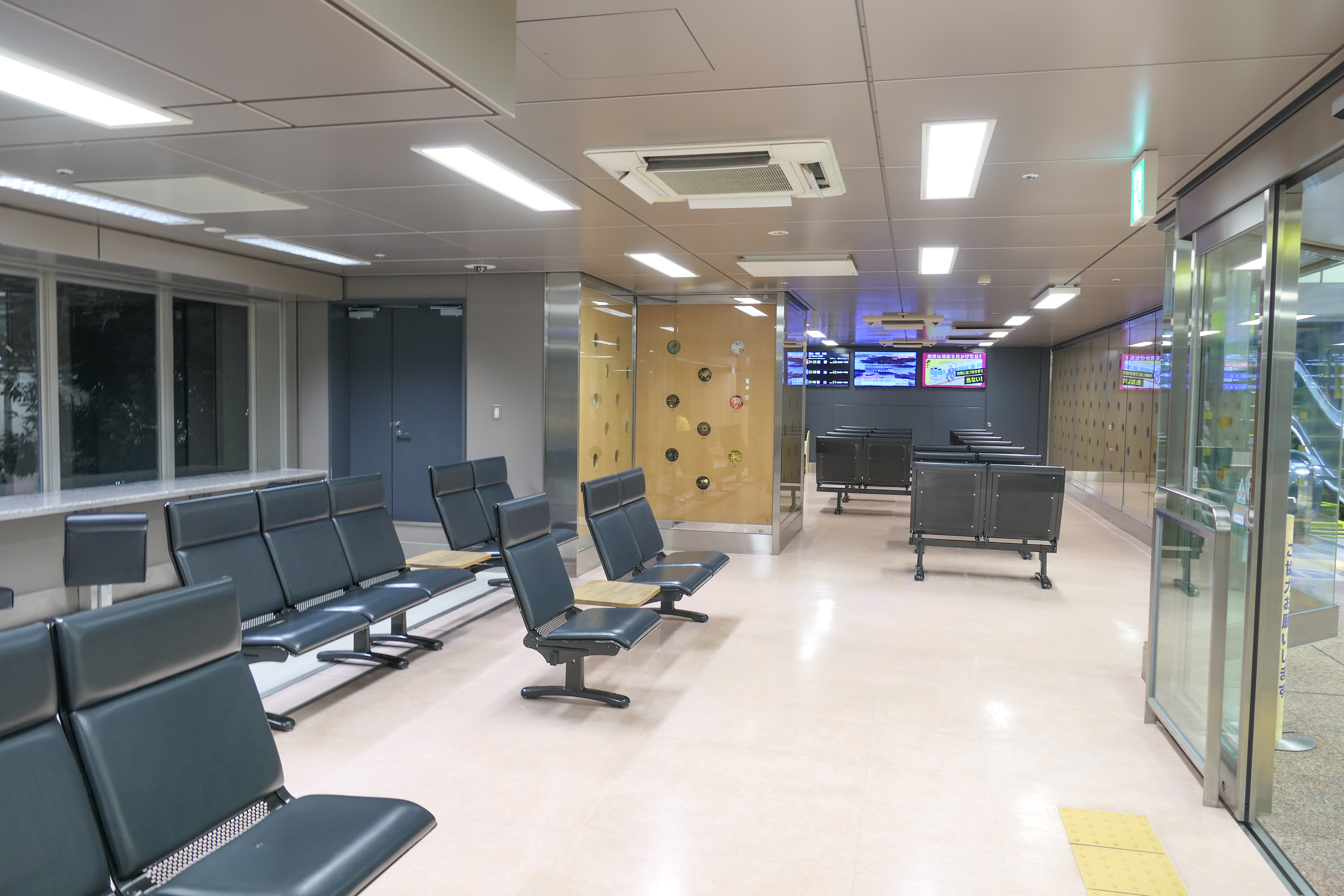
Waiting rooms, July 2022

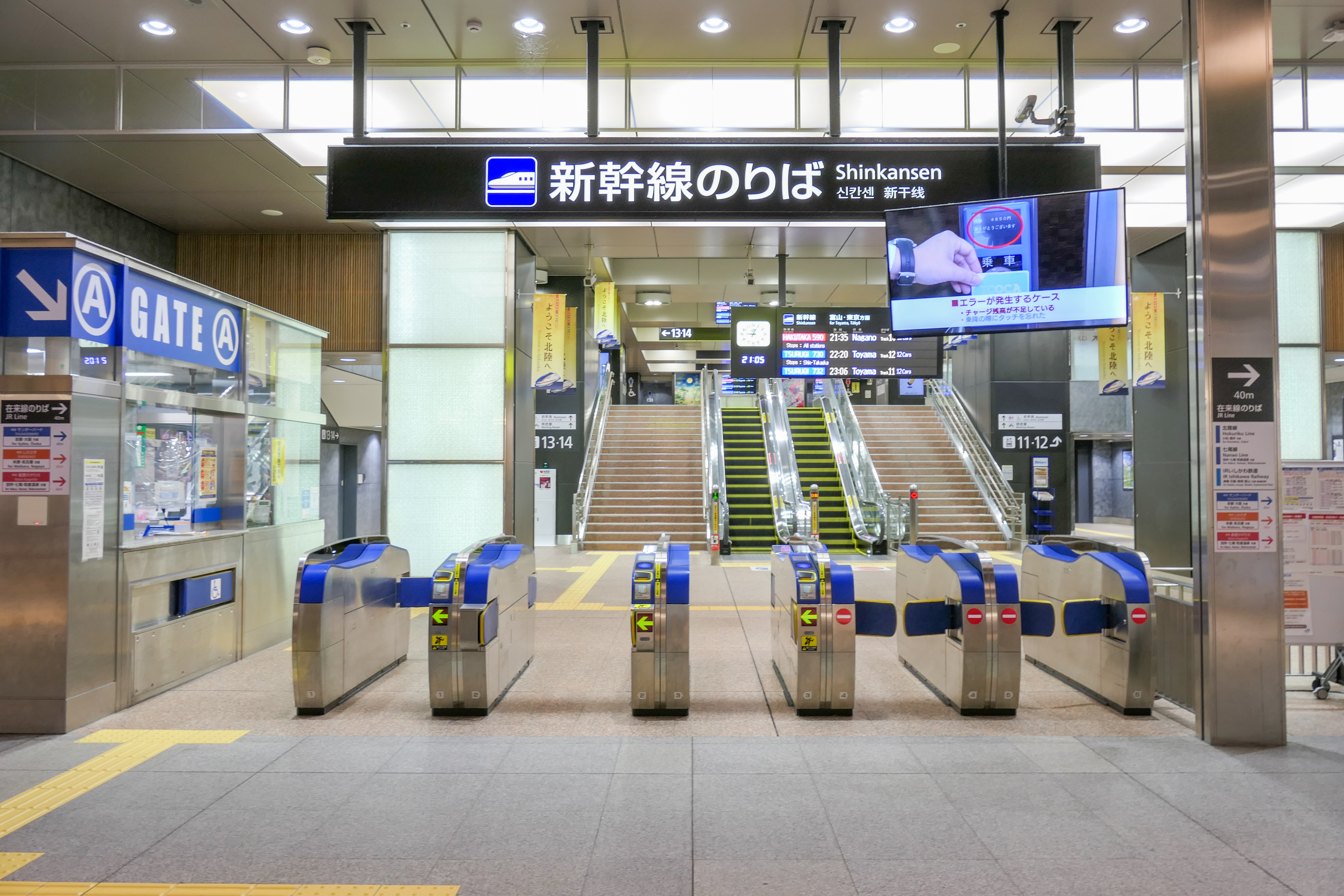
Shinkansen station fare gates, April 2022

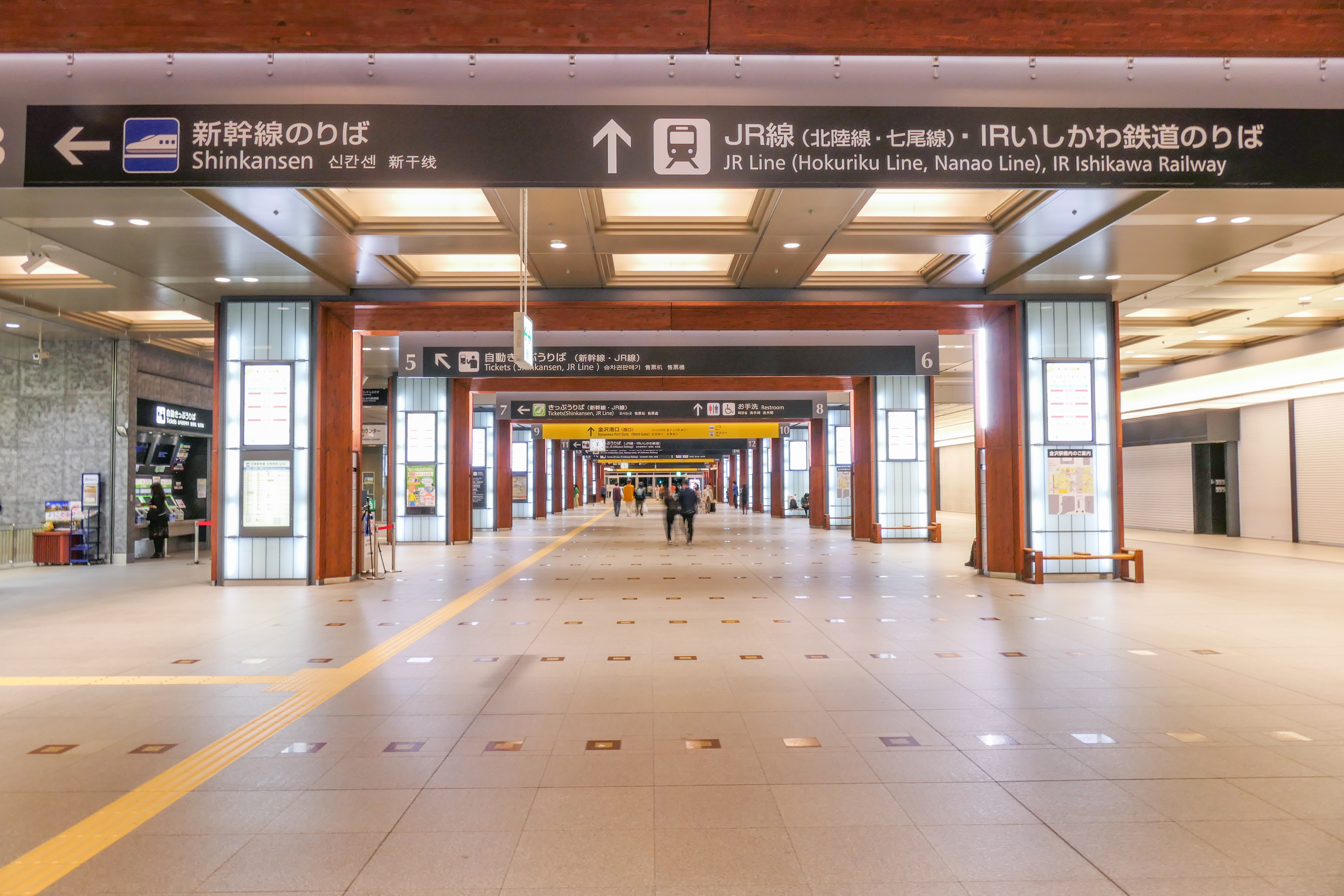
Station concourse, April 2022

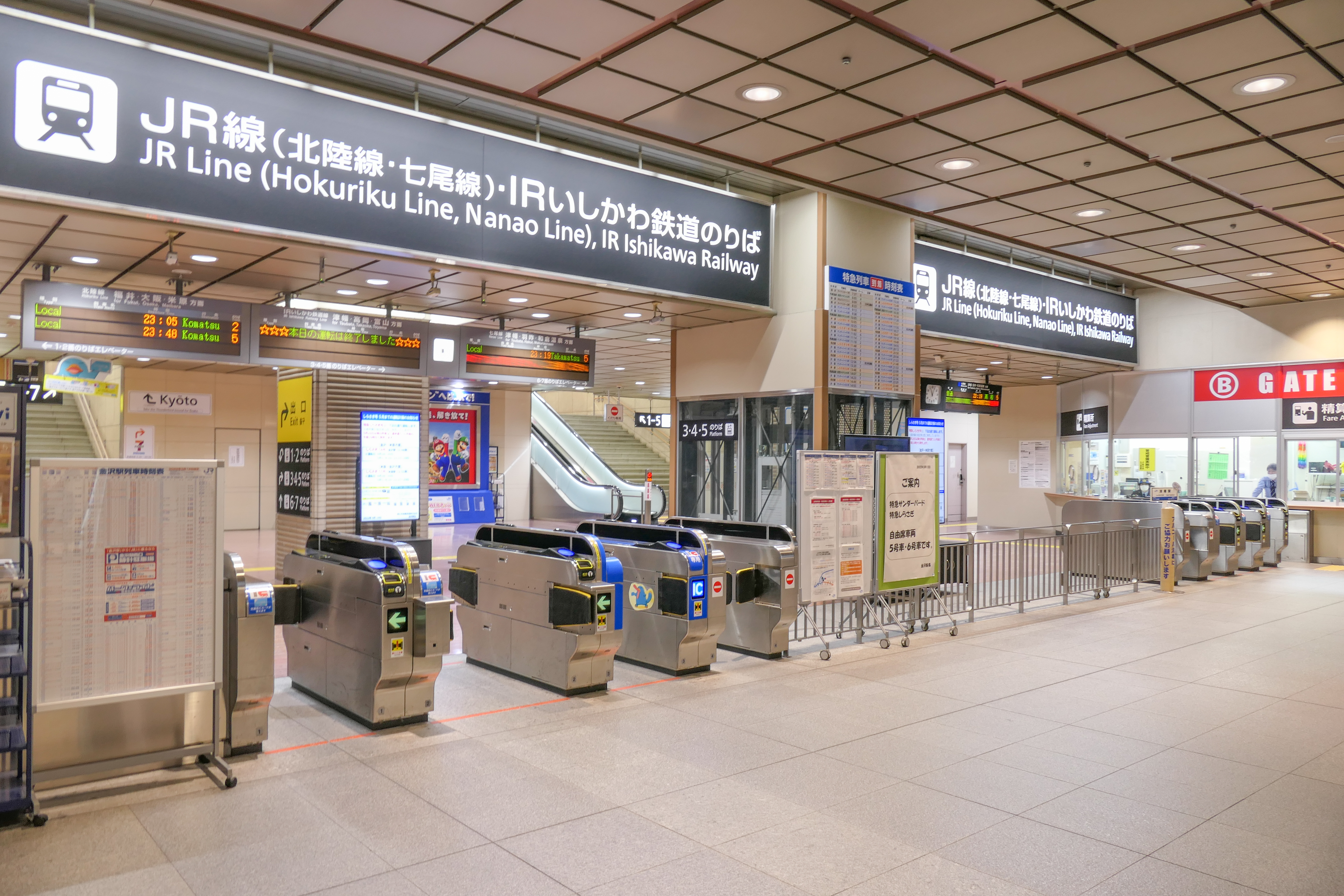
Fare gates, April 2022

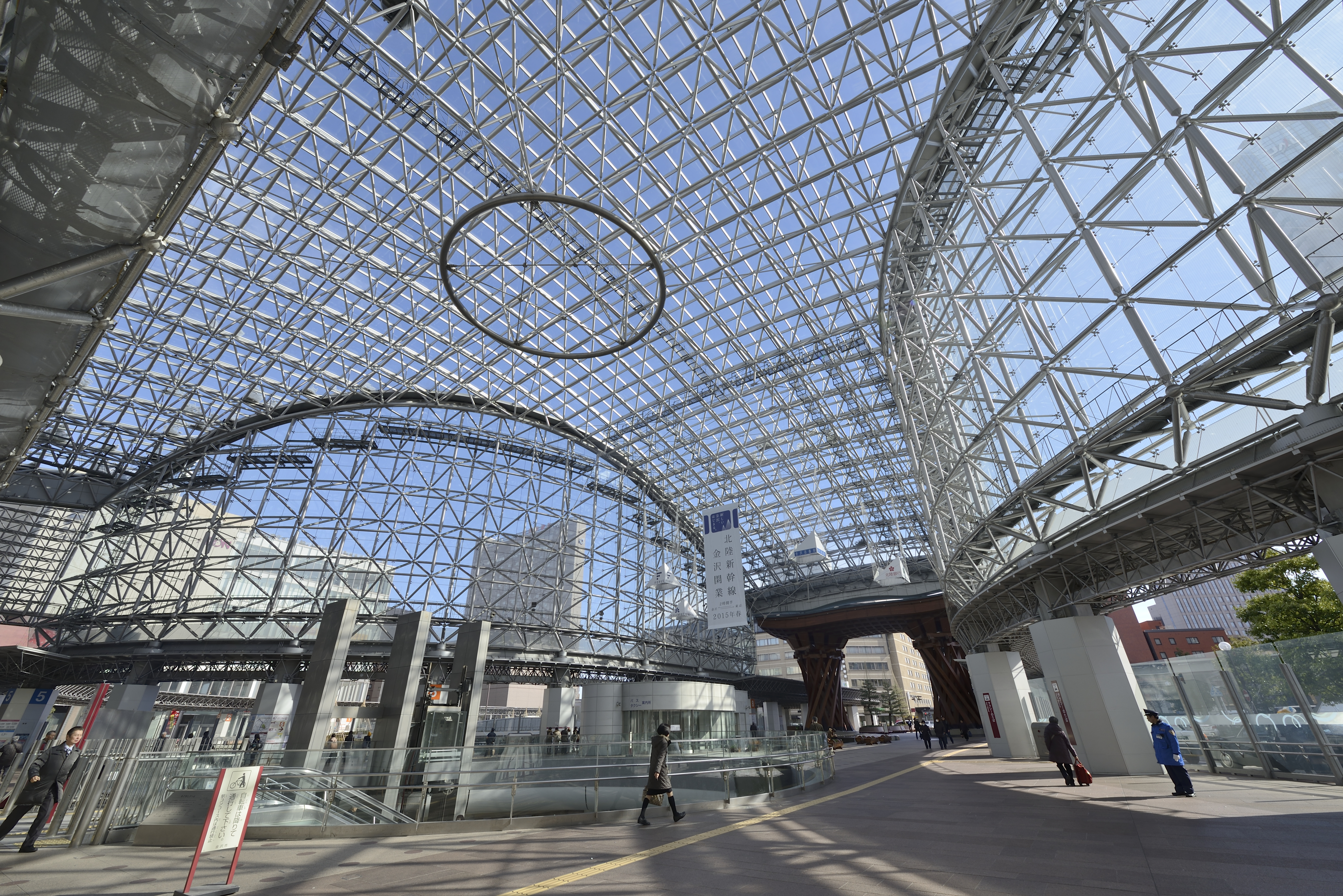
Motenashi Dome, January 2014

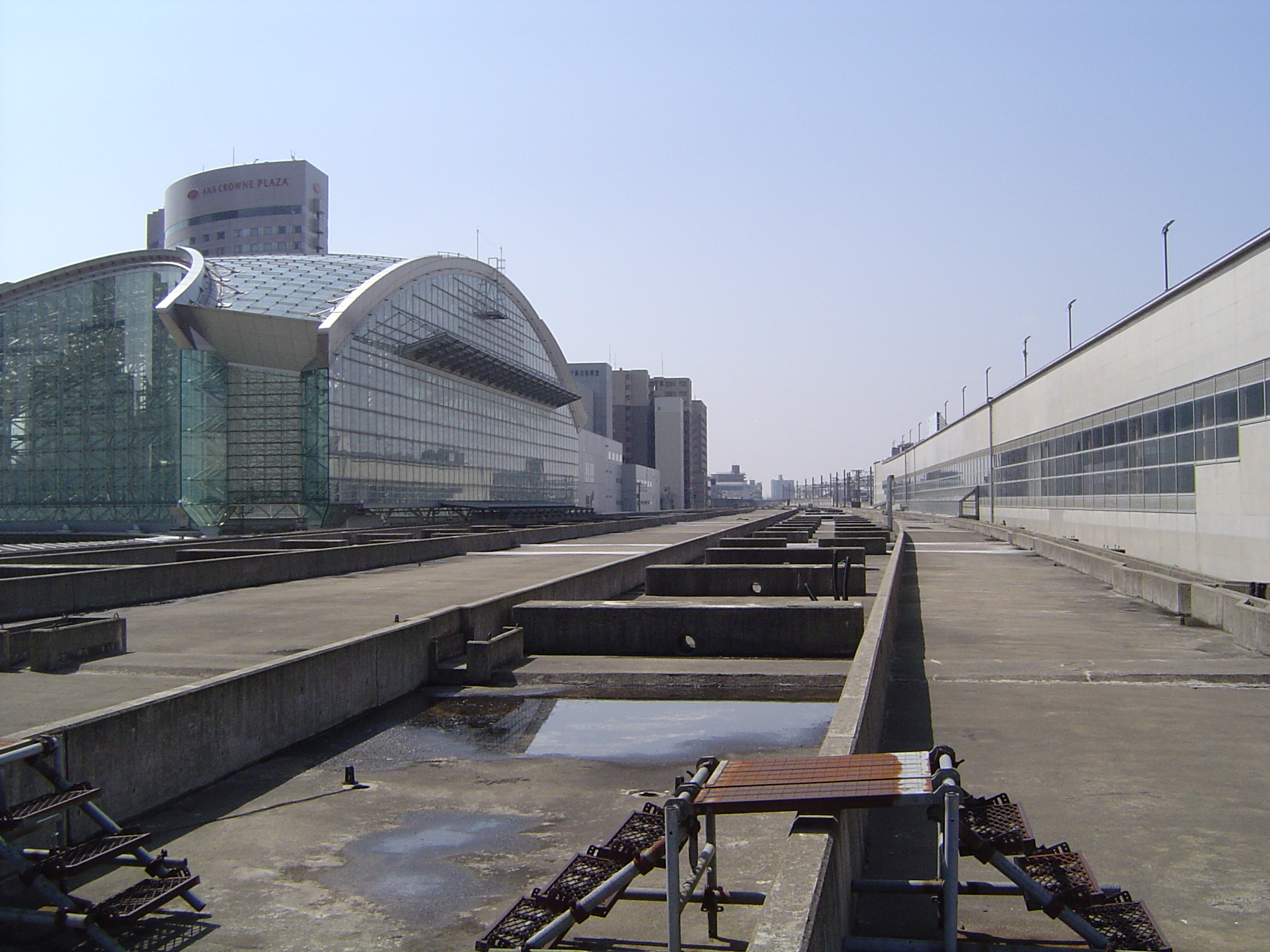
Construction of the Hokuriku Shinkansen platforms, March 2008
