= Daishōji Station =

Railway station in Kaga, Ishikawa Prefecture, Japan

Daishōji Station 大聖寺駅
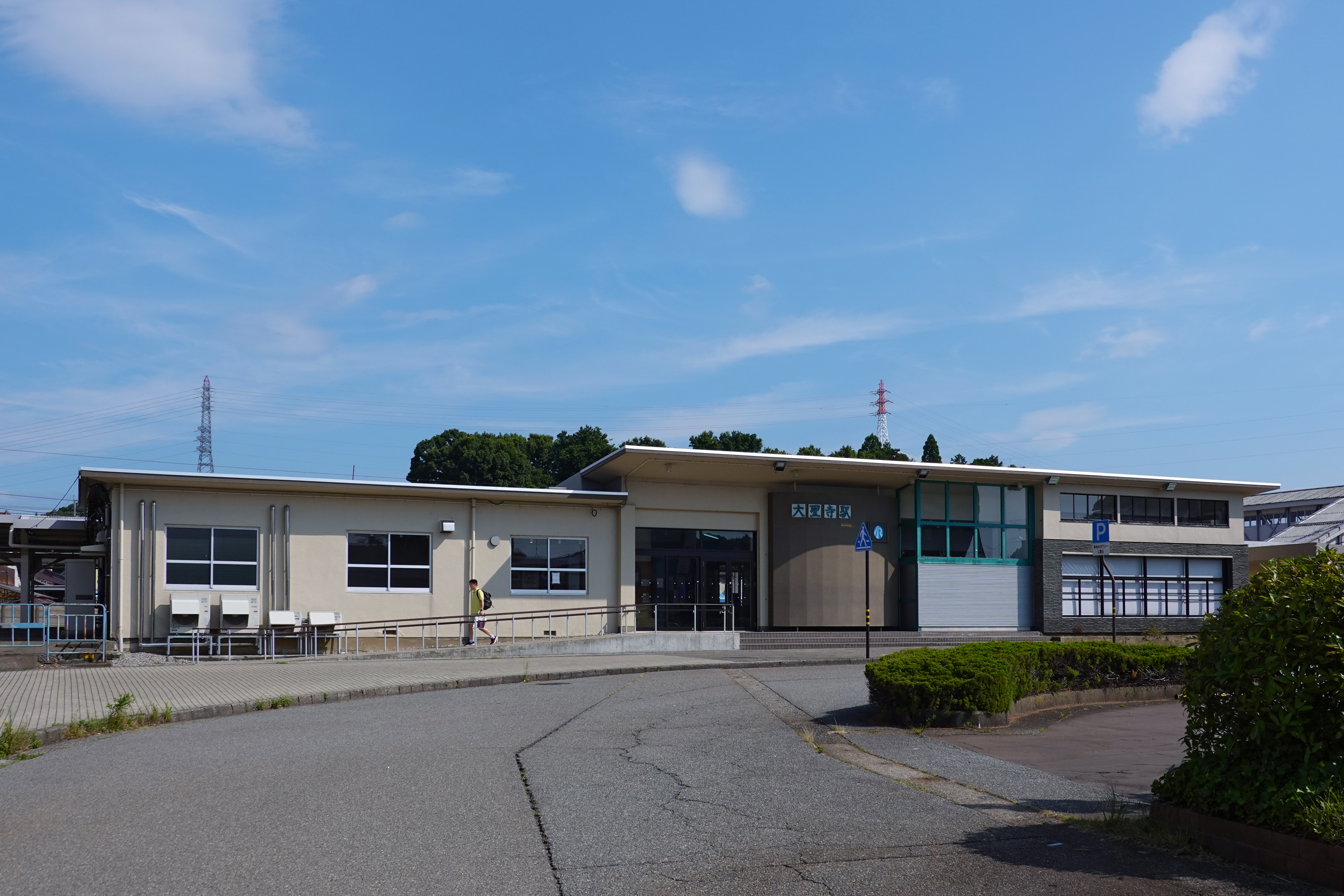
- Daishōji Station in 2026

General information
- Location: 136 Kumasaka-machi, Kaga-shi, Ishikawa-ken 922-0842; Japan
- Coordinates: 36.3002°N 136.3149°E
- Owner: IR Ishikawa Railway
- Operator: Hapi-Line Fukui; IR Ishikawa Railway
- Lines: Hapi-Line Fukui Line; IR Ishikawa Railway Line
- Distance: 84.3 km from Tsuruga
- Platforms: 1 side + 1 island platform
- Tracks: 3

Construction
- Structure type: At grade

Other information
- Status: Staffed (Midori no Madoguchi)
- Website: Official website

History
- Opened: 20 September 1897

Passengers
- FY2015: 902 daily

Services
Preceding station	IR Ishikawa Railway	Following station
Terminus	IR Ishikawa Railway Line Rapid Service	Kagaonsen towards Kurikara
through to Hapi-Line Fukui Line	IR Ishikawa Railway Line Local	Kagaonsen towards Kurikara
Preceding station	Hapi-Line Fukui	Following station
Ushinoya towards Tsuruga	Hapi-Line Fukui Line Local	through to IR Ishikawa Railway Line
Location
- Location within Japan

Daishōji Station (大聖寺駅, Daishōji-eki) is a railway station on the Hapi-Line Fukui Line in the city of Kaga, Ishikawa Prefecture, Japan, operated by the IR Ishikawa Railway and Hapi-line Fukui.

== Lines ==
Daishōji Station is served by the IR Ishikawa Railway and Hapi-line Fukui. It serves as the western terminus of the IR Ishikawa Railway and the eastern terminus of the Hapi-line Fukui Line.

== Station layout ==
The station consists of one side platform and one island platform connected by a footbridge. The station has a Midori no Madoguchi staffed ticket office.

=== Platforms ===
1	■ IR Ishikawa Railway Line	for Kanazawa
2	■ IR Ishikawa Railway Line	for Kanazawa
2	■ Hapi-Line Fukui Line	for Fukui and Tsuruga
3	■ Hapi-Line Fukui Line	for Fukui and Tsuruga

== History ==
The station opened on 20 September 1897. With the privatization of Japanese National Railways (JNR) on 1 April 1987, the station came under the control of JR West.

Effective the timetable revision on 16 March 2024, the station was transferred from the ownership of JR West to the IR Ishikawa Railway, serving as the western terminus for the IR Ishikawa Railway and the eastern terminus of the Hapi-line Fukui Line as of the same date. The transfer coincided with the opening of the Hokuriku Shinkansen extension from Kanazawa to Tsuruga.

== Passenger statistics ==
In fiscal 2015, the station was used by an average of 902 passengers daily (boarding passengers only).

== Surrounding area ==
- National Route 8
- National Route 305
- Kaga City Hall
- Kaga Post Office

== See also ==
- List of railway stations in Japan
