= Kanazawa Gakuin College =

Junior college in Ishikawa Prefecture, Japan

Coordinates: 36°31′1.9″N 136°41′44.5″E

Kanazawa Gakuin College (金沢学院短期大学, Kanazawa gakuin tanki daigaku) is a private junior college in Kanazawa, Ishikawa, Japan. Originally established in 1950 as a women's junior college, it became coeducational in 1998.
