= Mayuko Watanabe =

Mayuko Watanabae (渡辺 真由子, Mayuko Watanabe)
- Born: 1975 (age 50–51); Aichi Prefecture
- Education: Keio University; Simon Fraser University
- Occupations: Journalist; Media Scholar

Mayuko Watanabe (渡辺 真由子, Watanabe Mayuko; born 1975) is a Japanese journalist and media scholar specialized in media literacy, gender and sexuality. She had been a Senior Researcher and lecturer at Keio University Research Institute. Her research interest through nearly 20 years of career including as a TV news reporter has been the way of regulatory policy of obscene expressions. She has published research and provided media commentary on the topics of media communication and literacy of Japanese obscene content.

In 2017, Mayuko Watanabe was awarded a doctoral degree from Keio University and subsequently published a book based on her doctoral thesis. However, it was later revealed that a significant portion of the book consisted of unattributed quotations and plagiarized content. Similarly, her doctoral thesis was also found to be plagiarized. As a result, the publishing company Keisho Shobo discontinued the book and initiated a recall. In March 2018, Keio University revoked her doctoral degree.

== Works ==
Watanabe works on the Japanese Government to apply a concept of "Dignity in Obscene Expression" to its regulatory policy. She has served as a lecturer of Internet moral education for Ministry of Education, Culture, Sports, Science and Technology, and also as a lecturer of human rights for Ministry of Justice.

== Publications ==
=== Selected articles ===
- 2015 International trend and human rights over child pornography:the future agenda of Japan

Information and Communications Policy Review No.10 March 2015

- 2012 A Review of Research which Discusses the Effects of Obscene Harmful Information from Old Media to the Internet The Japan Society of Information and Communication Research No.30 (2), 2012
- 2012 Regulations and Media Literacy Education on Online Obscene Harmful Information: A Japanese Perspective Keio Communication Review No.34, 2012

=== Books ===
- 2013 Media Literacy of Obscene Information among Youth in Japan (Amazon Services International, Inc.)
- 2010 When Children Expose Their Secrets Online: addicted to SNS (Shufunotomo Co., Ltd., Tokyo)
- 2008 The Truth of Cyber bullying (Minerva Publishing, Inc., Kyoto)
- 2007 Media Literacy for Adults (Liberta Publishing Co., Ltd., Tokyo)

== Awards ==
Mayuko Watanabe has received prestigious awards as a director of Radio documentary Suicide of 16 years old boy- What did the bereaved family fight against?

- 2000 Highest award from the Japan Commercial Broadcasters Association
- 2000 Award for excellence from the Hoso Bunka Foundation
