= Sodani Station =

Railway station in Hakusan, Ishikawa Prefecture, Japan

Sodani Station 曽谷駅
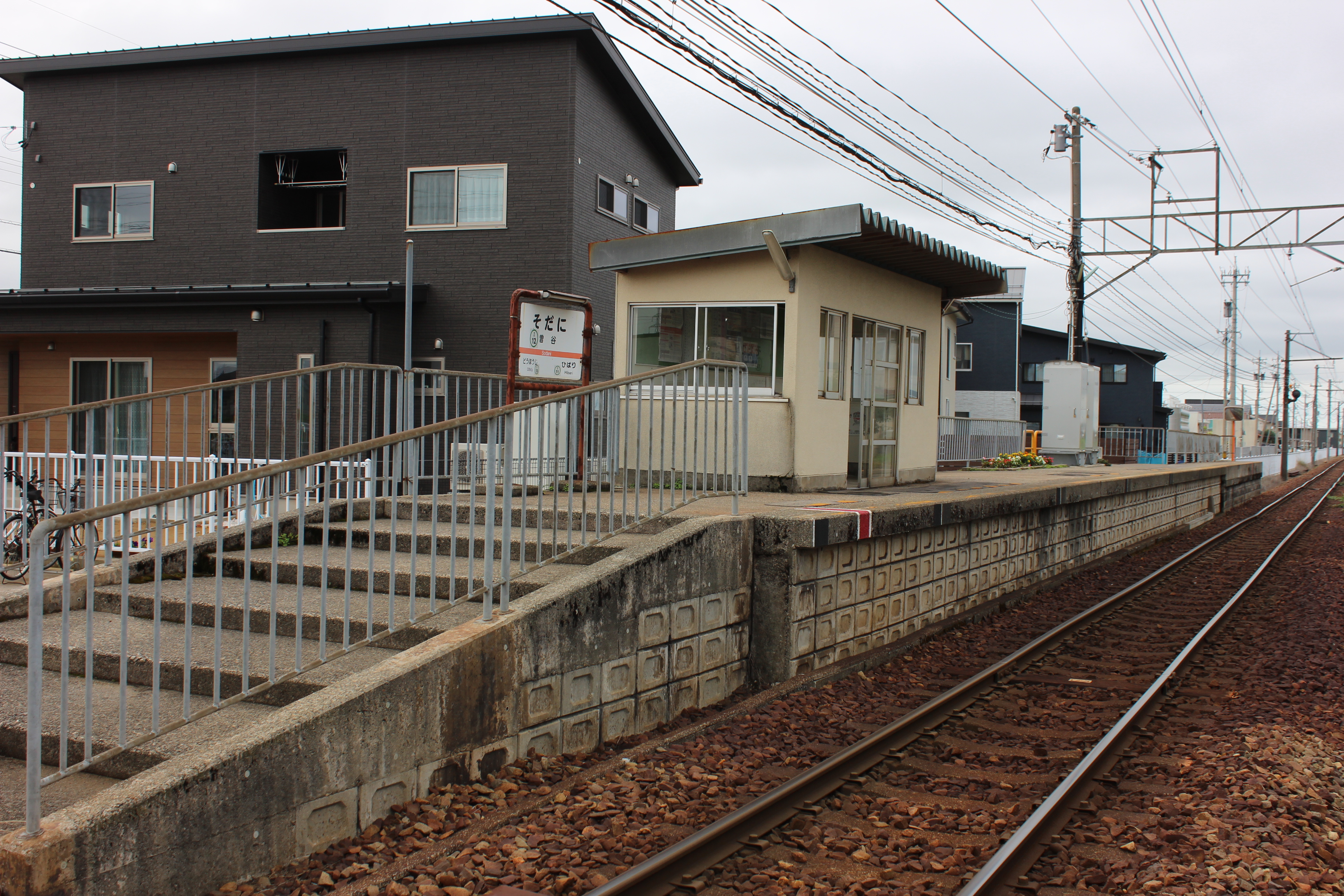
- Sodani Station platform in July 2020

General information
- Location: 33-2 Sodanimachi, Hakusan-shi, Ishikawa-ken 920-2101; Japan
- Coordinates: 36°29′23.28″N 136°36′51.42″E
- Operator: Hokuriku Railroad
- Line: ■ Hokuriku Railroad Ishikawa Line
- Distance: 9.3 km from Nomachi
- Platforms: 1 side platform
- Tracks: 1

Other information
- Status: Unstaffed
- Website: Official website

History
- Opened: 22 June 1915

Passengers
- FY2015: 54 daily
Location
- Location within Japan

Sodani Station (曽谷駅, Sodani-eki) is a railway station on the Hokuriku Railroad Ishikawa Line in the city of Hakusan, Ishikawa, Japan, operated by the private railway operator Hokuriku Railroad (Hokutetsu).

== Lines ==
Sodani Station is served by the 13.8 km Hokuriku Railroad Ishikawa Line between Nomachi and Tsurugi, and is 9.3 km from the starting point of the line at Nomachi.

== Station layout ==
The station consists of one side platform serving a single bi-directional track. The station is unattended.

== Adjacent stations ==
«	Service	»
Hokuriku Railroad Ishikawa Line
Hibari	Local	Dōhōji

== History ==
Sodani Station opened on 22 June 1915.

== Surrounding area ==
- Ishikawa Prefectural Route 179
- Nakamura-tome Precision Industry Co., Ltd

== See also ==
- List of railway stations in Japan
