= Magae Station =

Railway station in Kanazawa, Ishikawa Prefecture, Japan

Magae Station 馬替駅
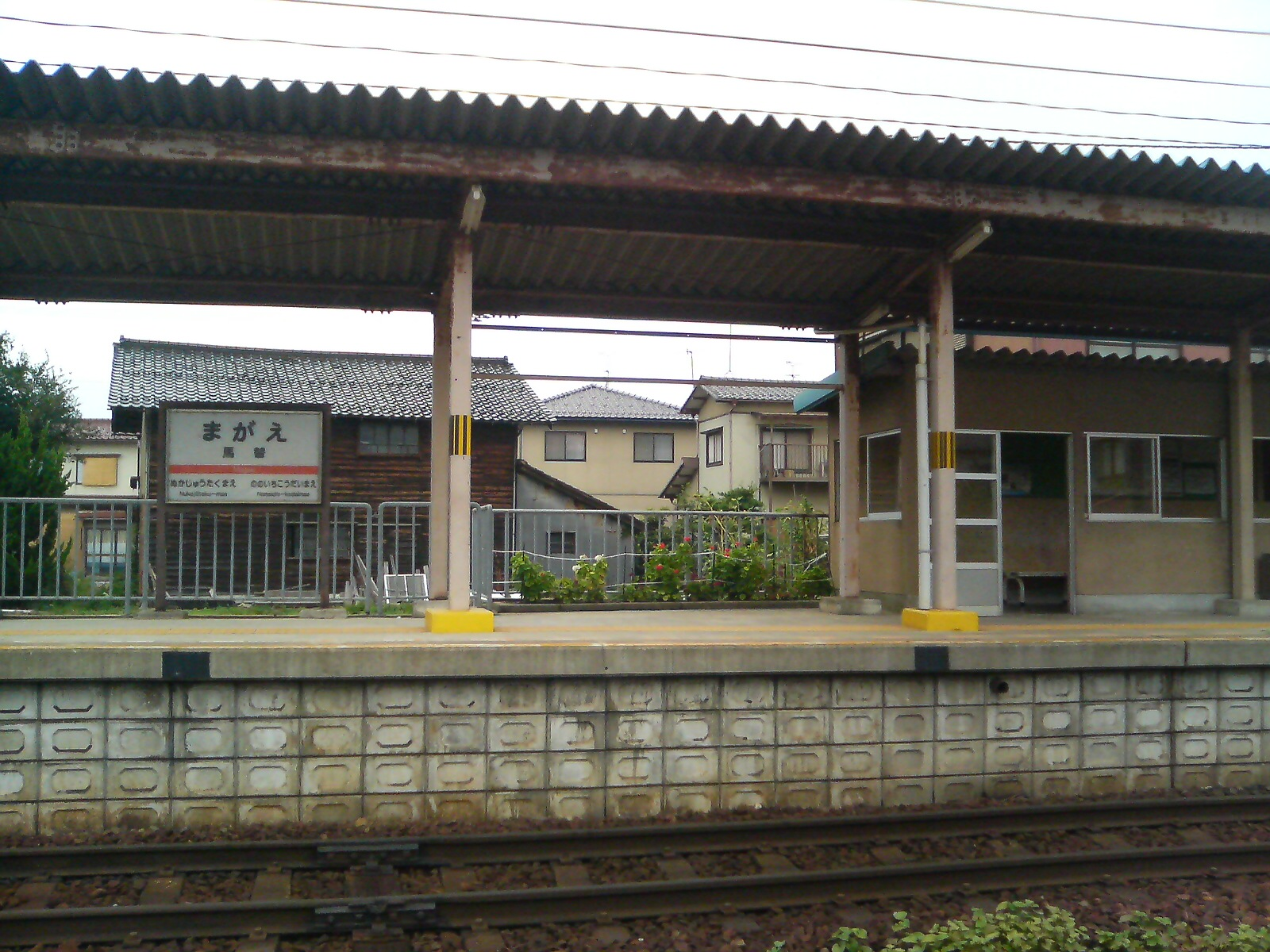
- Magae Station platform in September 2006

General information
- Location: Magae 3-chome, Kanazawa-shi, Ishikawa-ken 921-8141; Japan
- Coordinates: 36°31′22.96″N 136°37′14.24″E
- Operator: Hokuriku Railroad
- Line: ■ Hokuriku Railroad Ishikawa Line
- Distance: 5.5 km from Nomachi
- Platforms: 1 side platform
- Tracks: 1

Other information
- Status: Unstaffed
- Website: Official website

History
- Opened: 1 February 1943

Passengers
- FY2006: 282 daily
Location
- Location within Japan

Magae Station (馬替駅, Magae-eki) is a railway station on the Hokuriku Railroad Ishikawa Line in the city of Kanazawa, Ishikawa Prefecture Japan, operated by the private railway operator Hokuriku Railroad (Hokutetsu).

== Lines ==
Magae Station is served by the 13.8 km Hokuriku Railroad Ishikawa Line between Nomachi and Tsurugi, and is 5.5 km from the starting point of the line at Nomachi.

== Station layout ==
The station consists of one side platform serving a single bi-directional track. The station is unattended.

== Adjacent stations ==
«	Service	»
Hokuriku Railroad Ishikawa Line
Nonoichi-Kōdaimae	Local	Nuka-Jūtakumae

== History ==
Magae Station opened on 1 February 1943.

== Surrounding area ==
- Kanazawa Municipal Ogidai Elementary School
- Nonoichi City Sugawara Elementary School
- Minamigaoka Hospital

== See also ==
- List of railway stations in Japan
