= Oyanagi =

Oyanagi may refer to:

== People ==
- Ryōta Oyanagi (小柳 亮太; born 1993), Japanese sumo wrestler now known as Yutakayama Ryōta
- Kinya Oyanagi (大柳 錦也; born 1976), Japanese retired professional wrestler

== Places ==
- Oyanagi Station, a railway station on the Hokuriku Railroad Ishikawa Line in Hakusan, Ishikawa
