= Shijima Station =

Railway station in Kanazawa, Ishikawa Prefecture, Japan

Shijima Station 四十万駅
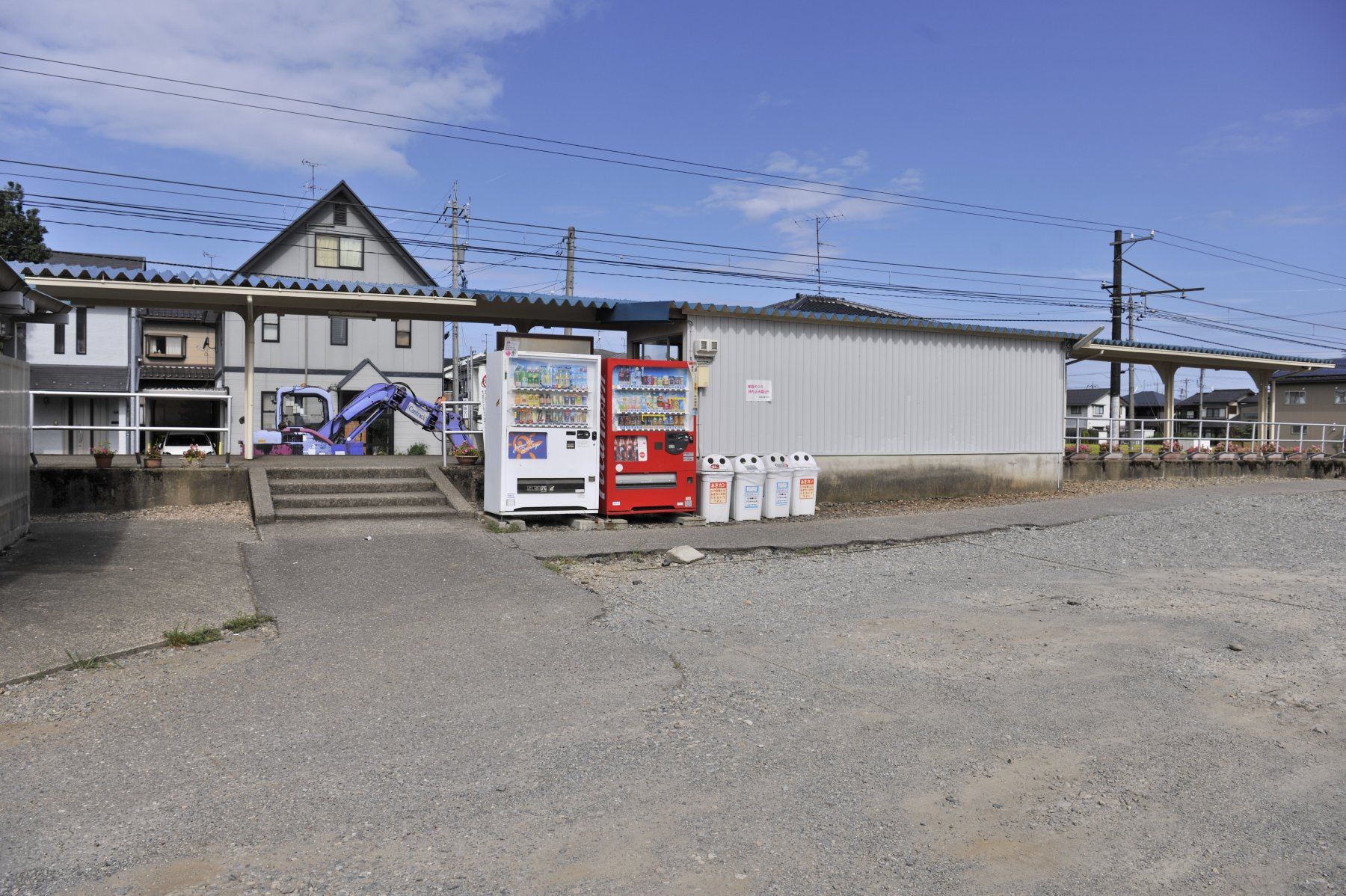
- Shijima Station (2016)

General information
- Location: Shijima 4-chome, Kanazawa-shi, Ishikawa-ken 921-8135; Japan
- Coordinates: 36°29′56″N 136°36′57″E
- Operator: Hokuriku Railroad
- Line: ■ Hokuriku Railroad Ishikawa Line
- Distance: 8.2 km from Nomachi
- Platforms: 1 side platform
- Tracks: 1

Other information
- Status: Unstaffed
- Website: Official website

History
- Opened: June 22, 1915

Passengers
- 2015: 289 daily
Location
- Location within Japan

Shijima Station (四十万駅, Shijima-eki) is a railway station on the Hokuriku Railroad Ishikawa Line in the city of Kanazawa, Ishikawa Prefecture, Japan, operated by the private railway operator Hokuriku Railroad (Hokutetsu).

== Lines ==
Shijima Station is served by the 13.8 km Hokuriku Railroad Ishikawa Line between Nomachi and Tsurugi, and is 8.2 km from the starting point of the line at Nomachi.

== Station layout ==
The station consists of one side platform serving a single bi-directional track. The station is unattended.

== Adjacent stations ==
«	Service	»
Hokuriku Railroad Ishikawa Line
Otomaru	Local	Hibari

== History ==
Shijima Station opened on 22 June 1915.

== Surrounding area ==
- Shijima Elementary School
- Kanazawa Murata Manufacturing Co., Ltd
- Ikeda Hospital
- Arcland Sakamoto Co., Ltd

== See also ==
- List of railway stations in Japan
