= Hibari Station =

Railway station in Hakusan, Ishikawa Prefecture, Japan

Hibari Station 陽羽里駅
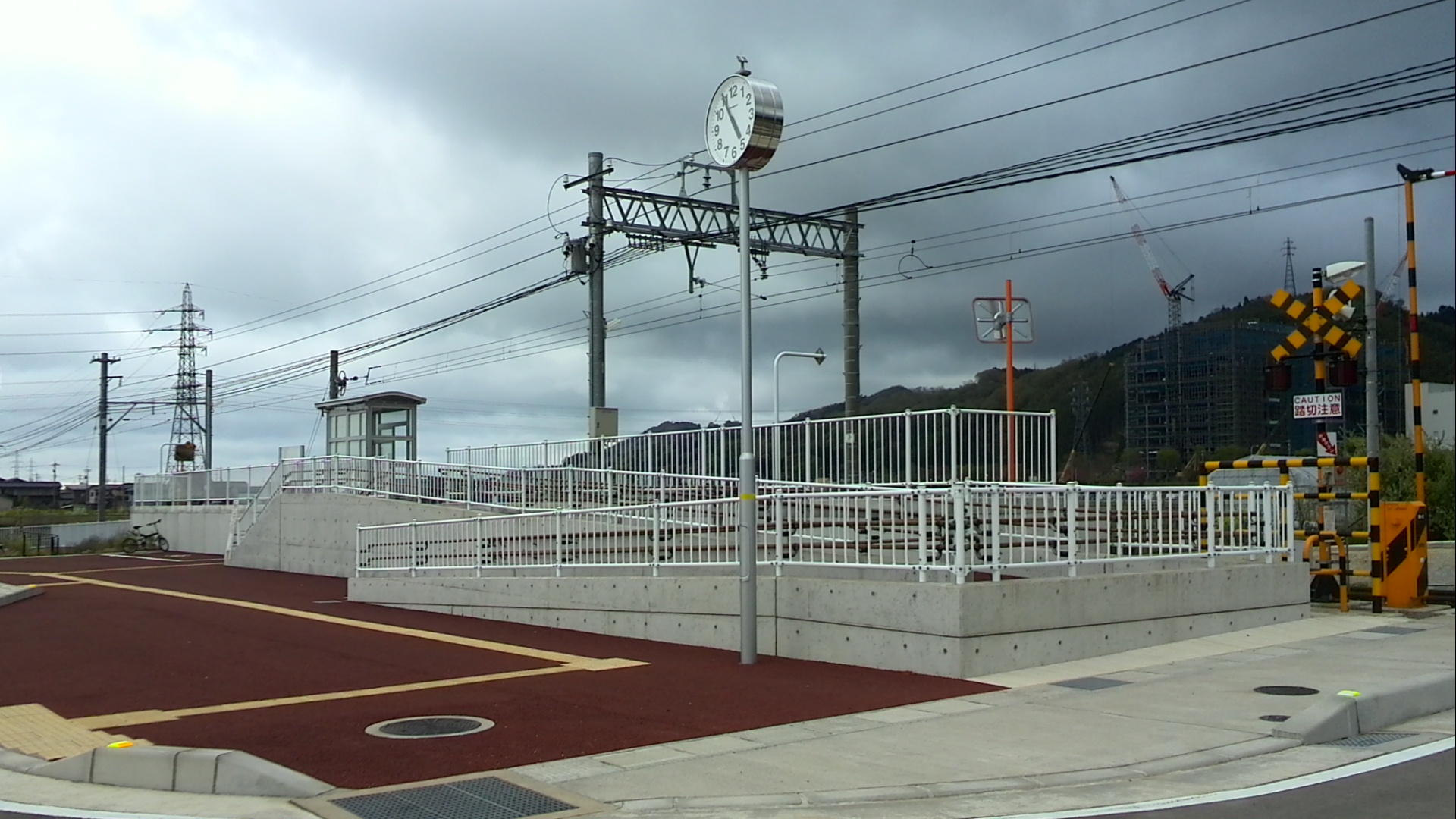
- Hibari Station in April 2016

General information
- Location: 40 O, Sodanimachi, Hakusan-shi, Ishikawa-ken 920-2101; Japan
- Coordinates: 36.4936°N 136.6149°E
- Operator: Hokuriku Railroad
- Line: ■ Hokuriku Railroad Ishikawa Line
- Distance: 8.8 km from Nomachi
- Platforms: 1 side platform
- Tracks: 1

Other information
- Status: Unstaffed
- Website: Official website

History
- Opened: 14 March 2015

Passengers
- FY2015: 11 (daily)
Location
- Location within Japan

Hibari Station (陽羽里駅, Hibari-eki) is a railway station on the Hokuriku Railroad Ishikawa Line in the city of Hakusan, Ishikawa, Japan, operated by the private railway operator Hokuriku Railroad (Hokutetsu).

== Lines ==
Hibari Station is served by the 13.8 km Hokuriku Railroad Ishikawa Line between Nomachi and Tsurugi, and is 8.8 km from the starting point of the line at Nomachi.

== Station layout ==
The station consists of one 41 m long side platform serving a single bi-directional track. A small waiting shelter is provided on the platform. The station is unattended.

== Adjacent stations ==
«	Service	»
Hokuriku Railroad Ishikawa Line
Shijima	Local	Sodani

== History ==
Hibari Station opened on 14 March 2015, coinciding with the introduction of a revised timetable. A completion ceremony for the station was held on 8 March 2015.

== Surrounding area ==
- Hibari New Town

== See also ==
- List of railway stations in Japan
