= Nonoichi-Kōdaimae Station =

Railway station in Nonoichi, Ishikawa Prefecture, Japan

Nonoichi-Kōdaimae Station 野々市工大前駅
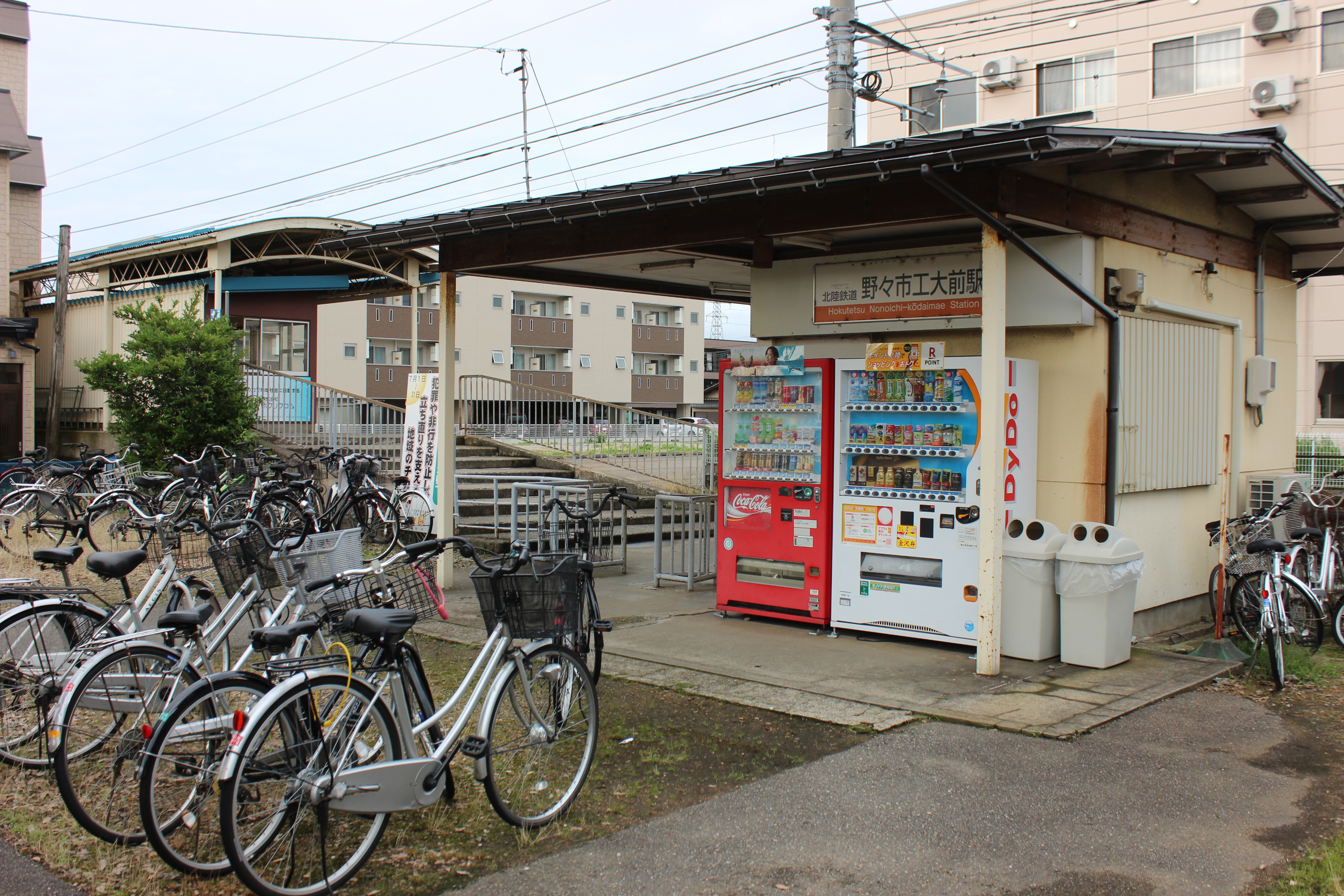
- Nonoichi-Kōdaimae Station in July 2020

General information
- Location: Honcho 2-chome, Nonoichi-shi, Ishikawa-ken 921-8815; Japan
- Coordinates: 36°31′58.34″N 136°37′18.5″E
- Operator: Hokuriku Railroad
- Line: ■ Hokuriku Railroad Ishikawa Line
- Distance: 4.5 km from Nomachi
- Platforms: 1 side platform
- Tracks: 1

Other information
- Status: Unstaffed
- Website: Official website

History
- Opened: 11 August 1931

Passengers
- FY2015: 523 daily
Location
- Location within Japan

Nonoichi-Kōdaimae Station (野々市工大前駅, Nonoichi-kōdaimae-eki) is a railway station on the Hokuriku Railroad Ishikawa Line in the city of Nonoichi, Ishikawa, Japan, operated by the private railway operator Hokuriku Railroad (Hokutetsu).

== Lines ==
Nonoichi-Kōdaimae Station is served by the 13.8 km Hokuriku Railroad Ishikawa Line between Nomachi and Tsurugi, and is 4.5 km from the starting point of the line at Nomachi.

== Station layout ==
The station consists of one side platform serving a single bi-directional track. The station is unattended.

== Adjacent stations ==
«	Service	»
Hokuriku Railroad Ishikawa Line
Nonoichi	Local	Magae

== History ==
Nonoichi-Kōdaimae Station opened on 11 August 1931.

== Surrounding area ==
- Kanazawa Institute of Technology
- Kanazawa College of Technology
- Kanazawa Welfare College
- Nonoichi Public Library
- Nonoichi Chuo Community Center

== See also ==
- List of railway stations in Japan
