= Nuka-Jūtakumae Station =

Railway station in Kanazawa, Ishikawa Prefecture, Japan

Nuka-Jūtakumae Station 額住宅前駅
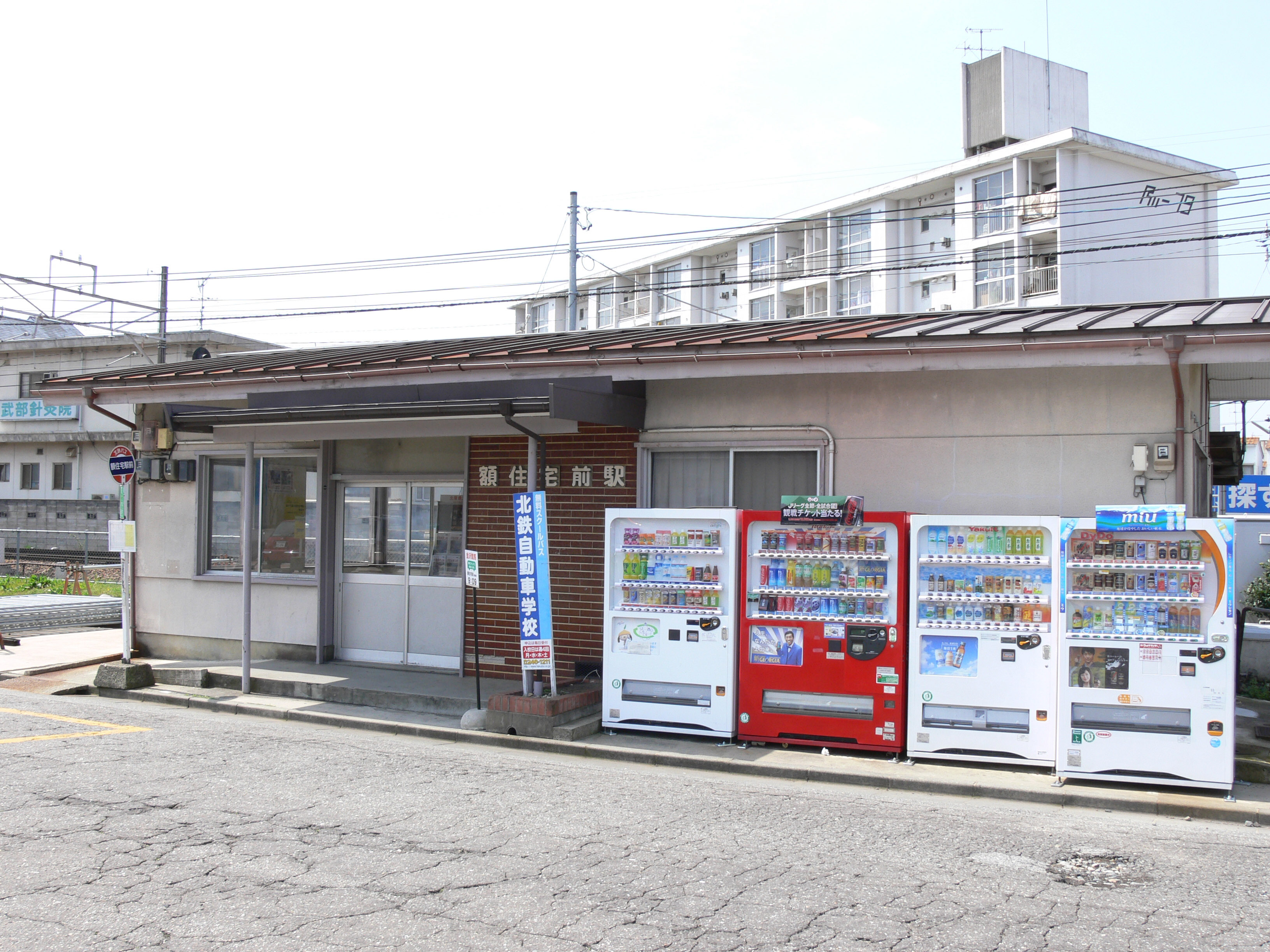
- Nuka-Jūtakumae Station building

General information
- Location: Nukashin-cho 1-chome, Kanazawa-shi, Ishikawa-ken 921-8149; Japan
- Coordinates: 36°31′5.92″N 136°37′8.03″E
- Operator: Hokuriku Railroad
- Line: ■ Hokuriku Railroad Ishikawa Line
- Distance: 6.1 km from Nomachi
- Platforms: 1 island platform
- Tracks: 2

Other information
- Status: Staffed
- Website: Official website

History
- Opened: June 22, 1915

Passengers
- 2006: 376 daily
Location
- Location within Japan

Nuka-Jūtakumae Station (額住宅前駅, Nukajūtaku-mae-eki) is a railway station on the Hokuriku Railroad Ishikawa Line in the city of Kanazawa, Ishikawa Prefecture, Japan, operated by the private railway operator Hokuriku Railroad (Hokutetsu).

== Lines ==
Nuka-Jūtakumae Station is served by the 13.8 km Hokuriku Railroad Ishikawa Line between Nomachi and Tsurugi, and is 6.1 km from the starting point of the line at Nomachi.

== Station layout ==
The station consists of one island platform serving two tracks, connected to the station building by a level crossing. The station is staffed.

== Adjacent stations ==
«	Service	»
Hokuriku Railroad Ishikawa Line
Magae	Local	Otomaru

== History ==
Nuka-Jūtakumae Station opened on 22 June 1915.

== Surrounding area ==
- Nonoichi City Hall

== See also ==
- List of railway stations in Japan
