= Oshino Station =

Railway station in Nonoichi, Ishikawa Prefecture, Japan

Oshino Station 押野駅
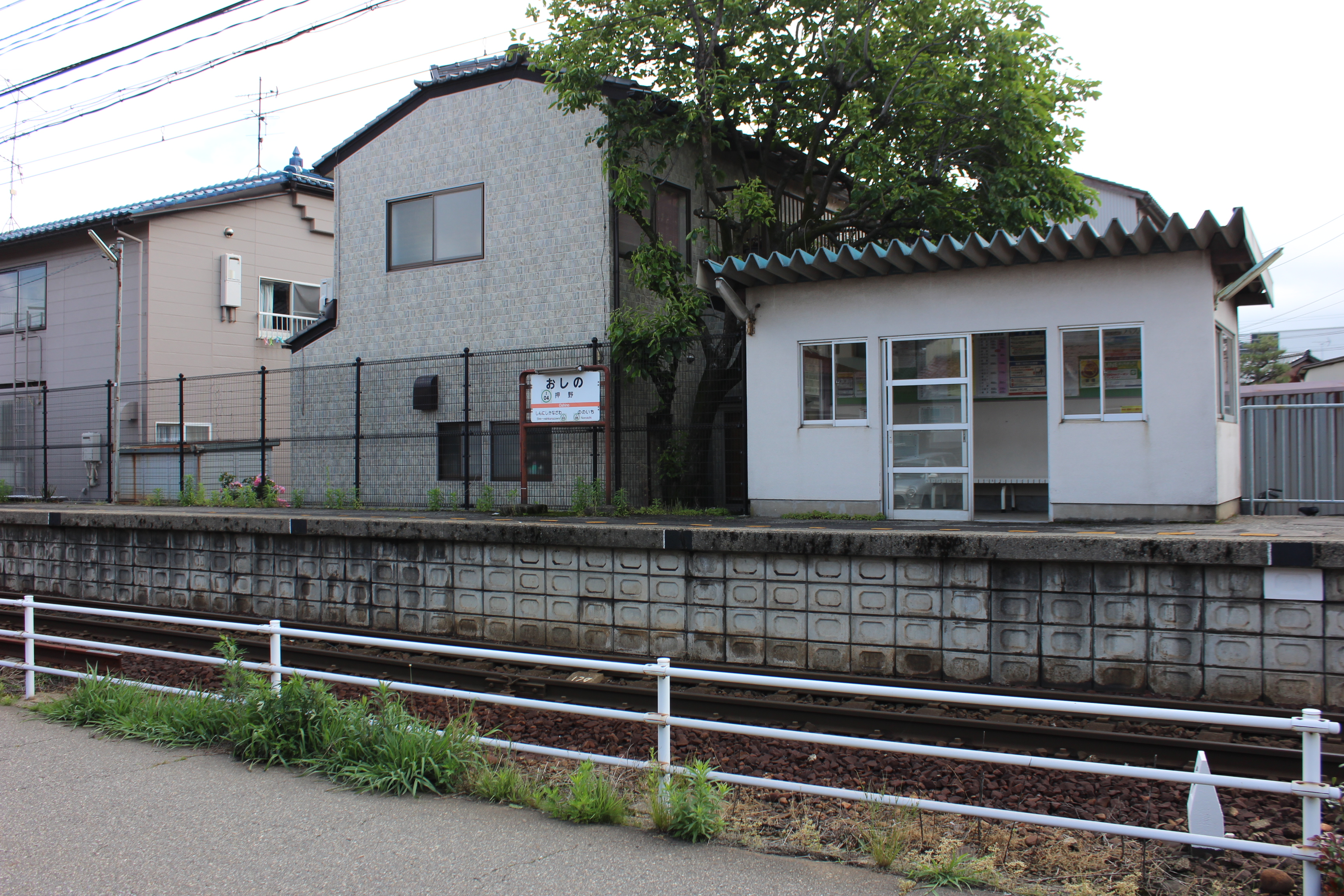
- Oshino Station in May 2021

General information
- Location: Oshino 5-chome, Nonoichi-shi, Ishikawa-ken 921-8802; Japan
- Coordinates: 36°32′30.89″N 136°37′19.53″E
- Operator: Hokuriku Railroad
- Line: ■ Hokuriku Railroad Ishikawa Line
- Distance: 3.4 km from Nomachi
- Platforms: 1 side platform
- Tracks: 1

Other information
- Status: Unstaffed
- Website: Official website

History
- Opened: 2 June 1915

Passengers
- FY2015: 60 daily
Location
- Location within Japan

Oshino Station (押野駅, Oshino-eki) is a railway station on the Hokuriku Railroad Ishikawa Line in the city of Nonoichi, Ishikawa, Japan, operated by the private railway operator Hokuriku Railroad (Hokutetsu).

== Lines ==
Oshino Station is served by the 13.8 km (8.6 mi) Hokuriku Railroad Ishikawa Line between Nomachi and Tsurugi, and is 3.4 km from the starting point of the line at Nomachi.

== Station layout ==
The station consists of one side platform serving a single bi-directional track. The station is unattended.

== Adjacent stations ==
«	Service	»
Hokuriku Railroad Ishikawa Line
Shin-Nishi-Kanazawa	Local	Nonoichi

== History ==
Oshino Station opened on 22 June 1915.

== Surrounding area ==
- Shibafune Koide headquarters
- National Route 157
- Oshino Chuo Park
- Oshino Post Office

== See also ==
- List of railway stations in Japan
