= Shin-Nishi-Kanazawa Station =

Railway station in Kanazawa, Ishikawa Prefecture, Japan

Shin-Nishi-Kanazawa Station 新西金沢駅
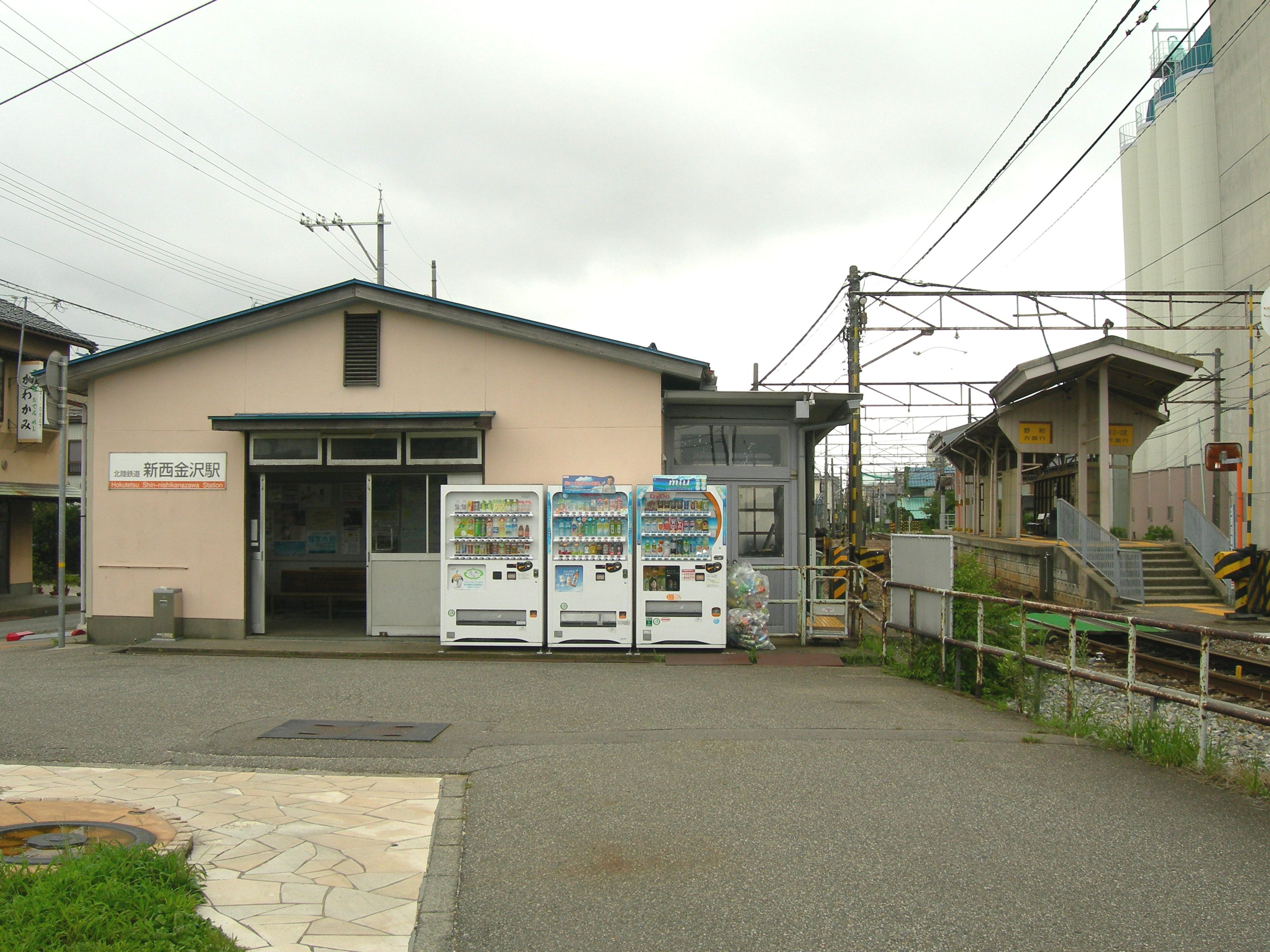
- Shin-Nisei-Kanazawa Station in August 2009

General information
- Location: Yonaizumimachi, Kanazawa-shi, Ishikawa-ken 921-8054; Japan
- Coordinates: 36°33′11.66″N 136°37′17.89″E
- Operator: Hokuriku Railroad
- Line: ■ Hokuriku Railroad Ishikawa Line
- Distance: 2.1 km from Nomachi
- Platforms: 1 island platform
- Tracks: 2
- Connections: Hokuriku Main Line (Nishi-Kanazawa Station)

Other information
- Status: Staffed
- Website: Official website

History
- Opened: 22 June 1915
- Former names: Shin-Nonoichi (to 1926)

Passengers
- 2006: 914 daily
Location
- Location within Japan

Shin-Nishi-Kanazawa Station (新西金沢駅, Shin-Nishikanazawa-eki) is a railway station on the Hokuriku Railroad Ishikawa Line in the city of Kanazawa, Ishikawa Prefecture Japan, operated by the private railway operator Hokuriku Railroad (Hokutetsu).

== Lines ==
Shin-Nishi-Kanazawa Station is served by the 13.8 km (8.6 mi) Hokuriku Railroad Ishikawa Line between Nomachi and Tsurugi, and is 2.1 km from the starting point of the line at Nomachi. The station is located in front of Nishi-Kanazawa Station on the Hokuriku Main Line of JR West.

== Station layout ==
The station consists of one island platform serving two tracks, connected to the station building by a level crossing.

== Adjacent stations ==
«	Service	»
Hokuriku Railroad Ishikawa Line
Nishiizumi	Local	Oshino

== History ==
Shin-Nishi-Kanazawa Station opened on 22 June 1915 as Shin-Nonoichi Station (新野々市駅). It was renamed to its present name on 10 February 1926.

== Surrounding area ==
- Kenmin Sport Recreation Plaza Kanazawa (ice skating rink)

== See also ==
- List of railway stations in Japan
