= Otomaru Station =

Railway station in Kanazawa, Ishikawa Prefecture, Japan

Otomaru Station 乙丸駅
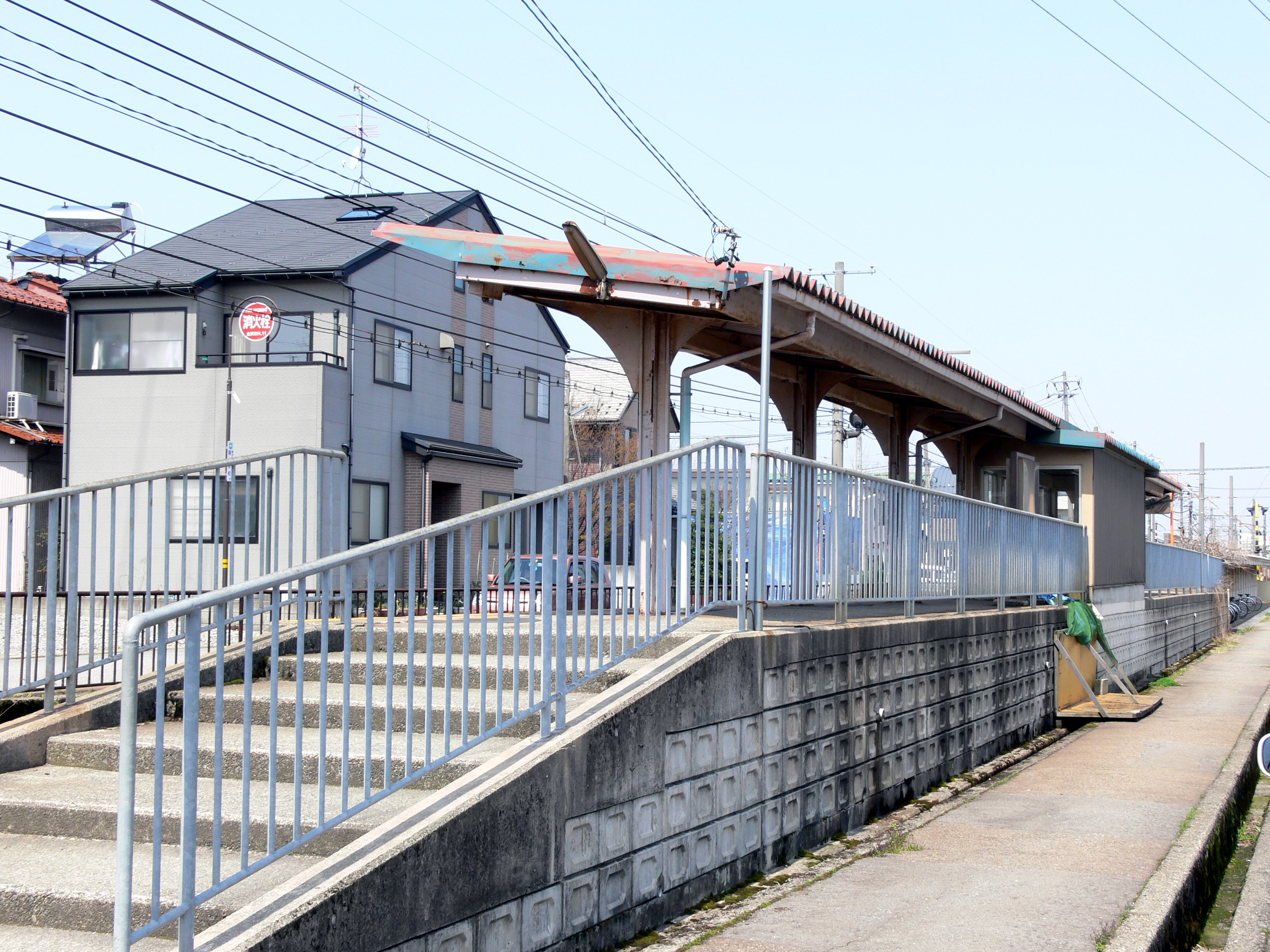
- Otomaru Station in April 2009

General information
- Location: Nukaotomarumachi, Kanazawa-shi, Ishikawa-ken 921-8146; Japan
- Coordinates: 36°30′42.48″N 136°37′3.66″E
- Operator: Hokuriku Railroad
- Line: ■ Hokuriku Railroad Ishikawa Line
- Distance: 6.8 km from Nomachi
- Platforms: 1 side platform
- Tracks: 1

Other information
- Status: Unstaffed
- Website: Official website

History
- Opened: March 2, 1935

Passengers
- FY2015: 524 daily
Location
- Location within Japan

Otomaru Station (乙丸駅, Otomaru-eki) is a railway station on the Hokuriku Railroad Ishikawa Line in the city of Kanazawa, Ishikawa Prefecture, Japan, operated by the private railway operator Hokuriku Railroad (Hokutetsu).

== Lines ==
Otomaru Station is served by the 13.8 km (8.6 mi) Hokuriku Railroad Ishikawa Line between Nomachi and Tsurugi, and is 6.8 km from the starting point of the line at Nomachi.

== Station layout ==
The station consists of one side platform serving a single bi-directional track. The station is unattended.

== Adjacent stations ==
«	Service	»
Hokuriku Railroad Ishikawa Line
Nuka-Jūtakumae	Local	Shijima

== History ==
Otomaru Station opened on 2 March 1935.

== Surrounding area ==
- Nuka Junior High School
- Nuka Elementary School

== See also ==
- List of railway stations in Japan
