= Dōhōji Station =

Railway station in Hakusan, Ishikawa Prefecture, Japan

Dōhōji Station 道法寺駅
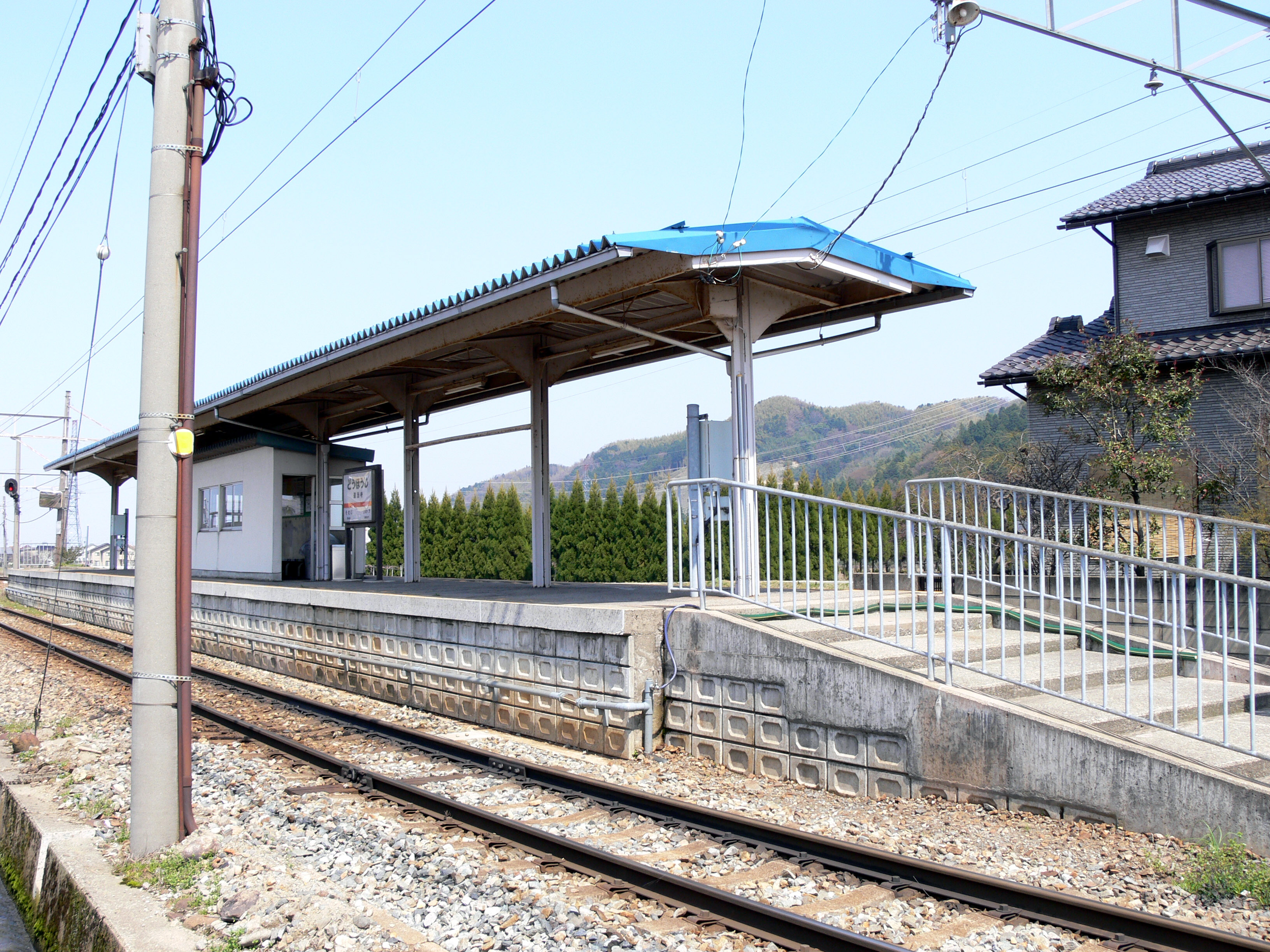
- Dōhōji Station platform in April 2009

General information
- Location: Dōhōjimachi, Hakusan-shi, Ishikawa-ken 920-2102; Japan
- Coordinates: 36°29′3.53″N 136°36′48.33″E
- Operator: Hokuriku Railroad
- Line: ■ Hokuriku Railroad Ishikawa Line
- Distance: 9.9 km from Nomachi
- Platforms: 1 island platform
- Tracks: 2

Other information
- Status: Unstaffed
- Website: Official website

History
- Opened: June 22, 1915

Passengers
- 2015: 261 daily
Location
- Location within Japan

Dōhōji Station (道法寺駅, Dōhōji-eki) is a railway station on the Hokuriku Railroad Ishikawa Line in the city of Hakusan, Ishikawa, Japan, operated by the private railway operator Hokuriku Railroad (Hokutetsu).

== Lines ==
Dōhōji Station is served by the 13.8 km Hokuriku Railroad Ishikawa Line between Nomachi and Tsurugi, and is 9.9 km from the starting point of the line at Nomachi.

== Station layout ==
The station consists of one island platform serving two tracks, connected to the station building by a level crossing. The station is unattended.

== Adjacent stations ==
«	Service	»
Hokuriku Railroad Ishikawa Line
Sodani	Local	Inokuchi

== History ==
Dōhōji Station opened on 22 June 1915.

== Surrounding area ==
- Ishikawa Prefectural Route 179
- Kuragatake (about 2 hours' walk)
- Hayashi Tsurugi Post Office

== See also ==
- List of railway stations in Japan
