= Oyanagi Station =

Railway station in Hakusan, Ishikawa Prefecture, Japan

Oyanagi Station 小柳駅
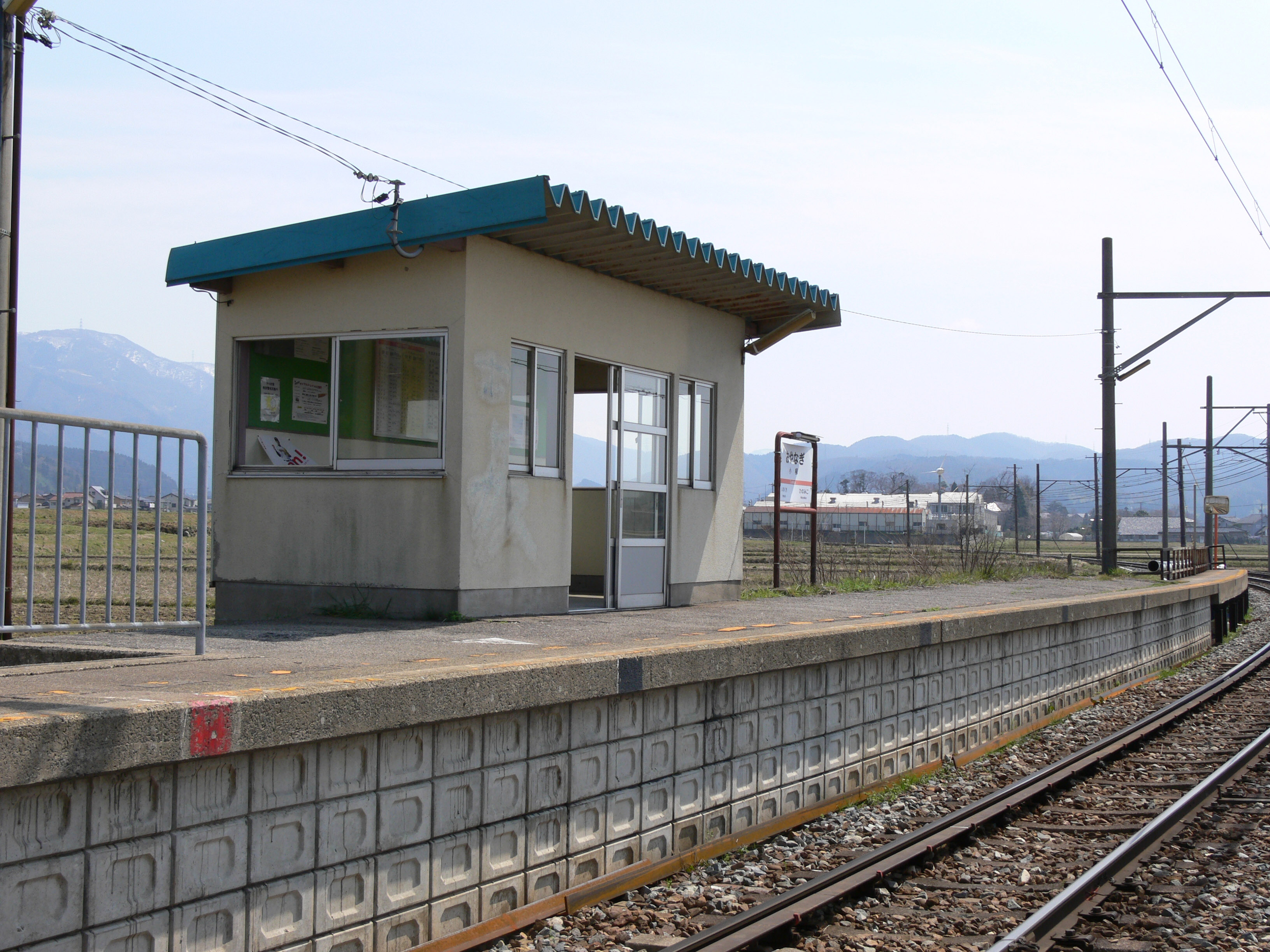
- Oyanagi Station in April 2009

General information
- Location: Oyanagimachi, Hakusan-shi, Ishikawa-ken 030-0915; Japan
- Coordinates: 36°28′15.83″N 136°36′41.37″E
- Operator: Hokuriku Railroad
- Line: ■ Hokuriku Railroad Ishikawa Line
- Distance: 11.4 km from Nomachi
- Platforms: 1 side platform
- Tracks: 1

Other information
- Status: Unstaffed
- Website: Official website

History
- Opened: 22 June 1915

Passengers
- 2015: 56 daily
Location
- Location within Japan

Oyanagi Station (小柳駅, Oyanagi-eki) is a railway station on the Hokuriku Railroad Ishikawa Line in Hakusan, Ishikawa, Japan, operated by the private railway operator Hokuriku Railroad (Hokutetsu).

== Lines ==
Oyanagi Station is served by the 13.8 km Hokuriku Railroad Ishikawa Line between Nomachi and Tsurugi, and is located between Inokuchi, and is 11.4 km from the starting point of the line at Nomachi.

== Station layout ==
The station consists of one side platform serving a single bi-directional track. The station is unattended.

== Adjacent stations ==
«	Service	»
Hokuriku Railroad Ishikawa Line
Inokuchi	Local	Hinomiko

== History ==
Oyanagi Station opened on 22 June 1915.

== Surrounding area ==
- Ishikawa Prefectural Route 179
- National Route 157

== See also ==
- List of railway stations in Japan
