= Motoharu Okamura =

Japanese naval officer

- 岡村 基春
- Born: 1901; Inokuchi, Kōchi, Japan
- Died: 13 July 1948 (aged 46-47); Mobara, Chiba, Japan
- Military career
- Allegiance: Empire of Japan
- Branch: Imperial Japanese Navy
- Service years: 1918–1945
- Rank: Captain
- Commands: Air Group 3 Air Group 302; Air Group 502; Gonoike Air Group; Air Group 341; Air Group 721
- Conflicts: World War II

Motoharu Okamura (岡村 基春, Okamura Motoharu; 1901 – 13 July 1948) was a Japanese naval aviator who served as a test pilot in the 1930s, and served as the commander of the 341st Tateyama Kōkūtai (Air Group) for kamikaze attacks in June 1944.

== Career ==
In June 1934, Lt. Okamura was flight testing the second prototype of two Mitsubishi 1MF10 Experimental 7-Shi carrier fighters when it entered an irrecoverable flat spin. Okamura bailed out, but lost four fingers in the accident, jeopardizing his career as a fighter pilot.

During the Kuangda campaign in China in 1938, Okamura served as a flight leader in the 12th Air Group's fighter squadron, where he was renowned for developing new air tactics for the Navy and was noted as an expert aviator and trainer. He had formed an air demonstration team known as "Genda's Flying Circus" with Yoshita Kobayashi and Minoru Genda, using Nakajima A2N Type 90 fighters, at Yokosuka in 1932.

Captain Okamura was in charge of the Tateyama Base in Tokyo, as well as the 341st Air Group Home, and, according to some sources, was the first officer to officially propose what would become known as kamikaze attack tactics, by arranging with his superiors for the first investigations on the plausibility and mechanisms of intentional suicide attacks on 15 June 1944. He was a veteran fighter pilot, who instructed the Yokosuka Air Corps at the war's outbreak. He also commanded a fighter group under Vice Admiral Kimpei Teraoka.

Okamura had expressed his desire to lead a volunteer group of suicide attacks some four months before Admiral Takijirō Ōnishi, commander of the Japanese naval air forces in the Philippines, presented the idea to his staff. While Vice Admiral Shigeru Fukudome, commander of the second air fleet, was inspecting the 341st Air Group, Captain Okamura took the chance to express his ideas on crash-dive tactics. “In our present situation, I firmly believe that the only way to swing the war in our favor is to resort to crash-dive attacks with our planes. There is no other way. There will be more than enough volunteers for this chance to save our country, and I would like to command such an operation. Provide me with 300 planes and I will turn the tide of war.”

"In August of 1944 the Naval Air Research and Development Center instituted an emergency development program of special piloted glide bombs, which bore the first character of Oka [sic], and which henceforth came to be known as the Marudai project. From late October to November [the Japanese] held accelerated flight tests of the new glide bombs. Tokyo established a new air corps charged with the mission of operating the Marudai weapons, and by the close of November, pilot training was well on its way. Captain Motoharu Okamura, one of Japan's most famous senior fighter pilots, became the corps commander; Okamura selected as his first fliers experienced fighter and dive-bomber pilots. Actually, these pilots were selected prior to the first Kamakaze attacks in the Philippines. The selection was unnecessary, beyond the critical choices made by Okamura; volunteers poured in by the thousands for the new operation, despite the 'special nature' of their future missions."

As commander of the new kamikaze unit in 1944, Captain Okamura commented that "there were so many volunteers for suicide missions that he referred to them as a swarm of bees," explaining: "Bees die after they have stung."

== Post-war life and death ==
After the war, Okamura, who worked on demobilization in his hometown of Kochi Prefecture, occasionally visited Kagoshima Prefecture in memorial trips to places associated with the kamikaze pilots.

In 13 July 1948, Okamura committed suicide by train in Chiba Prefecture, during a severe thunderstorm that caused power outages in the area. He left a suicide note addressed to his sister, but his motive remained unclear. His suicide may have been due to his refusal to testify about an incident in which his subordinates mistreated prisoners of war during his time as a commander of the 202nd Air Group unit in Southeast Asia. A promise made by him to kamikaze pilots before a sortie, stating that he would "follow [them] later someday", is another possible motive.

== Personal life ==
Okamura remarried after his first wife died. He had several children. His brother-in-law was fellow IJN officer and aviator Takashige Egusa, who was noted for being the Air Group Commander of aircraft carrier Soryu during the Pearl Harbor attack through the ship's loss at the Battle of Midway.

== Promotions ==
- Midshipman - 1 June 1922
- Ensign - 20 September 1923
- Lieutenant (j.g.) - 1 December 1925
- Lieutenant - 1 December 1927
- Lieutenant Commander - 15 November 1934
- Commander - 15 November 1939
- Captain - 1 May 1944
