= Hinomiko Station =

Railway station in Hakusan, Ishikawa Prefecture, Japan

Hinomiko Station 日御子駅
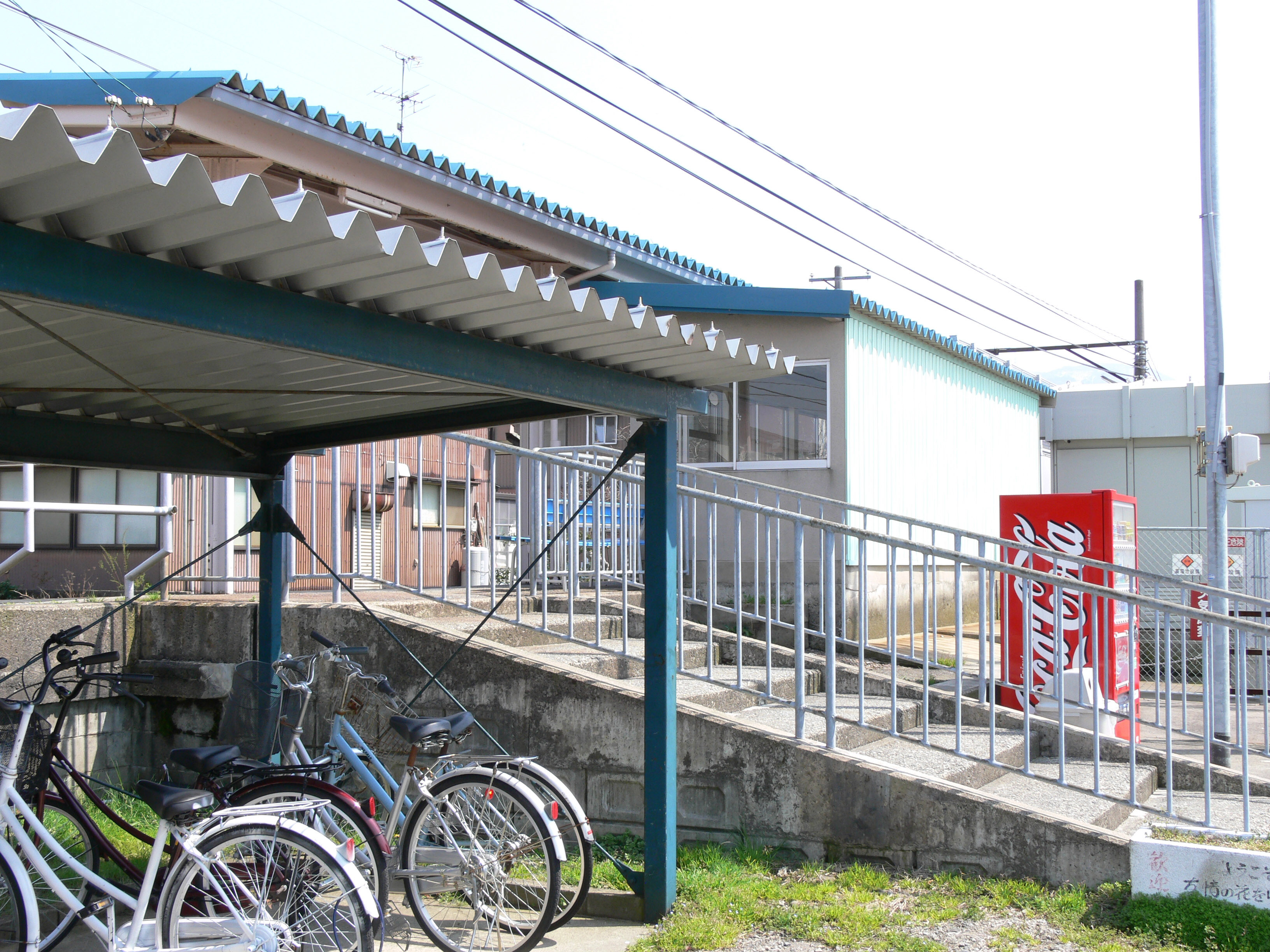
- Hinomiko Station in April 2009

General information
- Location: Hinomikomachi, Hakusan-san, Ishikawa-ken 920-2153; Japan
- Coordinates: 36°27′53.77″N 136°36′53.96″E
- Operator: Hokuriku Railroad
- Line: ■ Hokuriku Railroad Ishikawa Line
- Distance: 12.1 km from Nomachi
- Platforms: 1 side platform
- Tracks: 1

Other information
- Status: Unstaffed
- Website: Official website

History
- Opened: 5 September 1925

Passengers
- 2015: 180 daily
Location
- Location within Japan

Hinomiko Station (日御子駅, Hinomiko-eki) is a railway station on the Hokuriku Railroad Ishikawa Line in Hakusan, Ishikawa, Japan, operated by the private railway operator Hokuriku Railroad (Hokutetsu).

== Lines ==
Hinomiko Station is served by the 13.8 km Hokuriku Railroad Ishikawa Line between Nomachi and Tsurugi, and is 12.1 km from the starting point of the line at Nomachi.

== Station layout ==
The station consists of one side platform serving a single bi-directional track. The station is unattended.

== Adjacent stations ==
«	Service	»
Hokuriku Railroad Ishikawa Line
Oyanagi	Local	Tsurugi

== History ==
Hinomiko Station opened on 5 September 1925.

== Surrounding area ==
- Ishikawa Prefectural Route 179
- Ishikawa Prefectural Route 45
- National Route 157
- Tsurugi Nikko Factory
- Tsurugi Rbcontrols Factory
- JA Hakusan Zoyama Branch
- Tsurugu Senior Living Center
- Hakusan Community Center
- Hinomiko Post Office
- Daianji Temple

== See also ==
- List of railway stations in Japan
