= Inokuchi Station (Ishikawa) =

Railway station in Hakusan, Ishikawa Prefecture, Japan

Inokuchi Station 井口駅
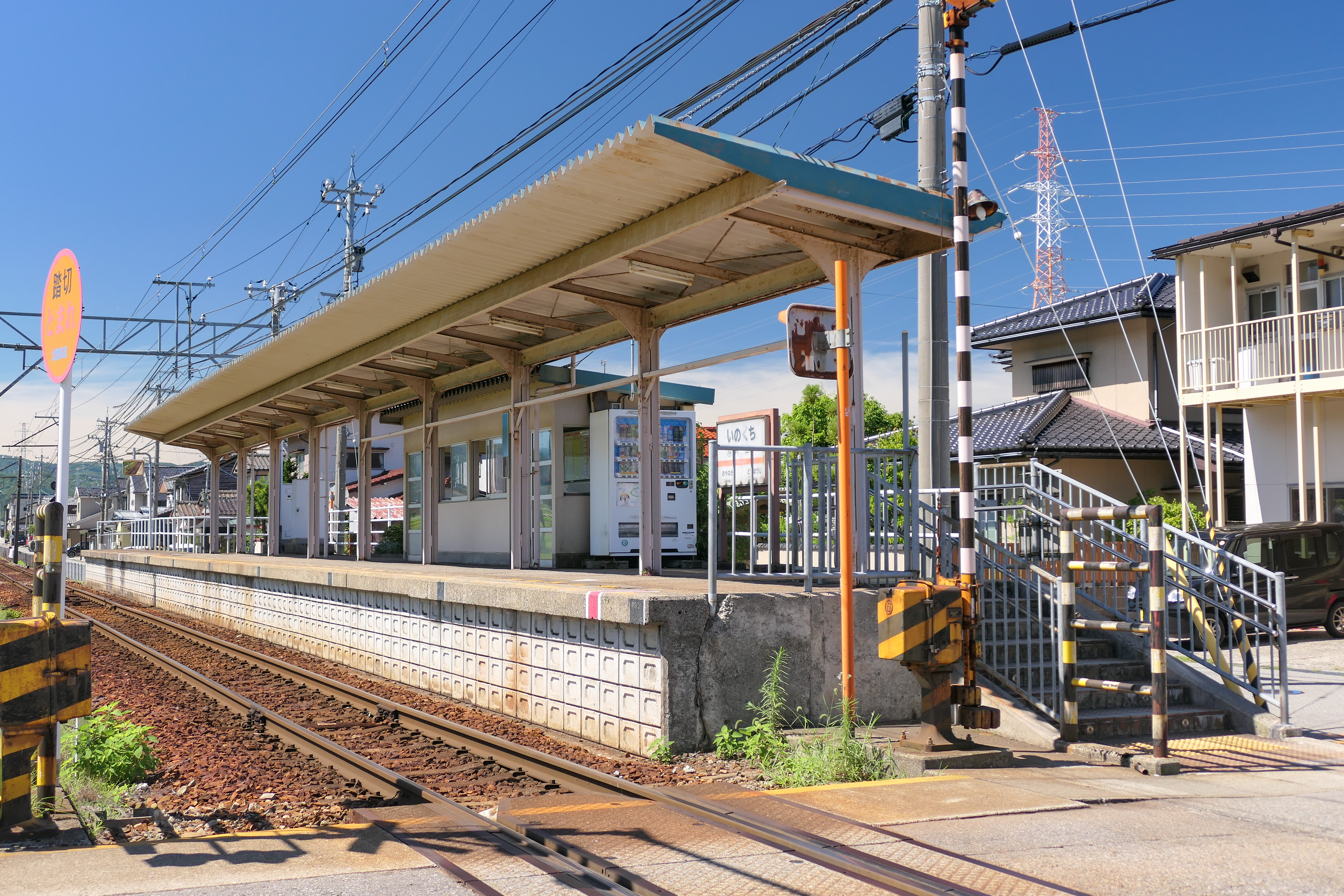
- Inokuchi Station in July 2022

General information
- Location: Meikō 2-chome, Hakusan-shi, Ishikawa-ken, 920-2152; Japan
- Coordinates: 36°28′36.08″N 136°36′44.15″E
- Operator: Hokuriku Railroad
- Line: ■ Hokuriku Railroad Ishikawa Line
- Distance: 10.7 km from Nomachi
- Platforms: 1 side platform
- Tracks: 1

Other information
- Status: Unstaffed
- Website: Official website

History
- Opened: August 1, 1937

Passengers
- 2015: 266 daily
Location
- Location within Japan

Inokuchi Station (井口駅, Inokuchi-eki) is a railway station on the Hokuriku Railroad Ishikawa Line in the city of Hakusan, Ishikawa, Japan, operated by the private railway operator Hokuriku Railroad (Hokutetsu).

== Lines ==
Inokuchi Station is served by the 13.8 km Hokuriku Railroad Ishikawa Line between Nomachi and Tsurugi, and is 10.7 km from the starting point of the line at Nomachi.

== Station layout ==
The station consists of one side platform serving a single bi-directional track. The station is unattended.

== Adjacent stations ==
«	Service	»
Hokuriku Railroad Ishikawa Line
Dōhōji	Local	Oyanagi

== History ==
Inokuchi Station opened on 1 August 1937.

== Surrounding area ==
- Ishikawa Prefectural Route 179
- Meiko Elementary School

== See also ==
- List of railway stations in Japan
