= Nishiizumi Station =

Railway station in Kanazawa, Ishikawa Prefecture, Japan

Nishiizumi Station 西泉駅
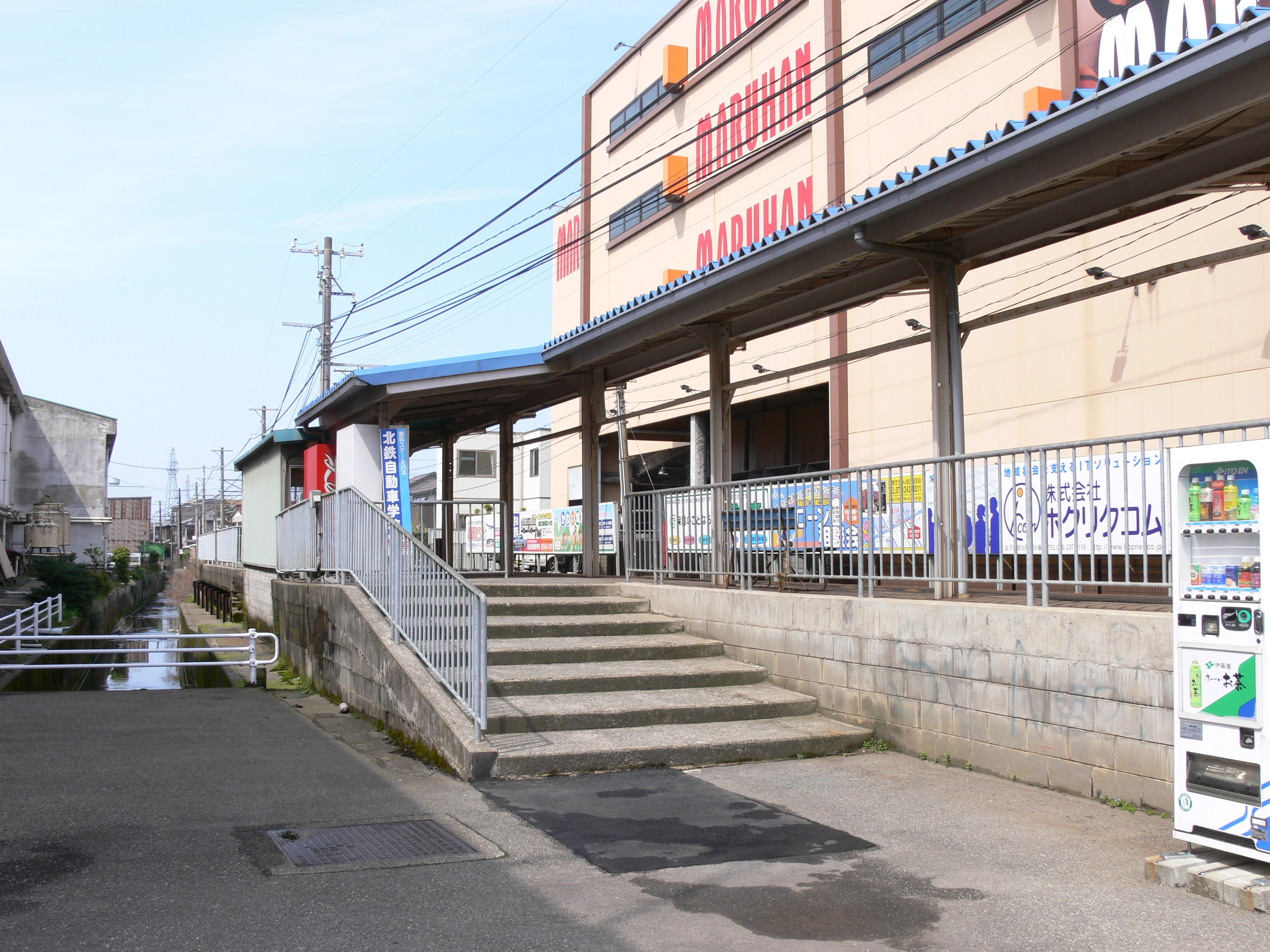
- Nishiizumi Station platform in April 2009

General information
- Location: Izumihonmachi, Kanazawa-shi, Ishikawa-ken 921-8042; Japan
- Coordinates: 36°33′12.35″N 136°38′1.01″E
- Operator: Hokuriku Railroad
- Line: ■ Ishikawa Line
- Distance: 1.0 km (0.62 mi) from Nomachi
- Platforms: 1 side platform
- Tracks: 1

Other information
- Status: Unstaffed
- Website: Official website

History
- Opened: 1 December 1934

Passengers
- 2006: 240 daily

Services
Preceding station	Hokuriku Railroad	Following station
Nomachi Terminus	Ishikawa Line	Shin-Nishi-Kanazawa towards Tsurugi
Location
- Location within Japan

Nishiizumi Station (西泉駅, Nishiizumi-eki) is a railway station on the Hokuriku Railroad Ishikawa Line in the city of Kanazawa, Ishikawa Prefecture, Japan, operated by the private railway operator Hokuriku Railroad (Hokutetsu).

== Lines ==
Nishi-Izumi Station is served by the 13.8 km Hokuriku Railroad Ishikawa Line between Nomachi and Tsurugi, and is 1.0 km from the starting point of the line at Nomachi.

== Station layout ==
The station consists of one side platform serving a single bi-directional track. The station is unattended.

== History ==
Nishi-Izumi Station opened on 1 December 1934.

== Surrounding area ==
- Kanazawa High School
- Kanazawa Fushimi High School
- Kanazawa Central High School
- Kanazawa Municipal Seisen Junior High School
- Kanazawa Nishi-Izumi Post Office
- Kanazawa City Fire Departments

== See also ==
- List of railway stations in Japan
