= Nikaidō Tokuyo =

Japanese educator

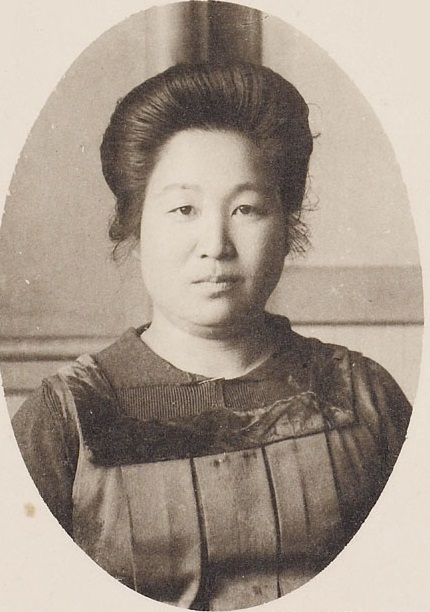
- Born: 二階堂トクヨ; December 5, 1880; Miyagi prefecture
- Died: July 17, 1941 (aged 60)

Nikaidō Tokuyo (二階堂トクヨ, December 5, 1880 – July 17, 1941) was a Japanese educator, founder of the Japan Women's College of Physical Education. She introduced western competitive team sports, including field hockey and cricket, to Japanese women's colleges.

== Early life ==
Nikaidō Tokuyo was born in Miyagi prefecture. She was educated in Matsuyama and Osaka. She held a beginner teacher's license at age 15. She attended Fukushima Normal School for teacher training, but had to change her name temporarily, and become the adopted daughter of a Fukushima resident to qualify. She graduated from normal school in 1899. She pursued further studies at Woman's Higher Normal School.

== Career ==
When Nikaidō was assigned to teach gymnastics at Ishikawa Prefectural High School for Girls, she felt unprepared for the subject. She was granted a scholarship to go to England and study women's physical education programs. She spent three years in England, working with Martina Bergman-Österberg at her training college at Kingsfield House in Kent. She returned to Japan in 1915, ready to start her own training school for physical educators.

Nikaidō opened the Nikaidō Taiso Juku in Tokyo in 1922. She and Inokuchi Akuri both tried to develop practical clothing for women's exercise and sports programs at their schools, Nikaidō favouring tunics similar to what she saw in England, and Inokuchi favoring the middy blouse and short skirts she saw in the United States. One of Nikaidō Taiso Juku's first students, track athlete Hitomi Kinue, became the first Japanese woman to win an Olympic medal, and returned to the school as an instructor. Nikaidō's school later became the Japan Women's College of Physical Education.

Nikaido was also vice-chair of the Federation for Japanese Women's Sports.

== Personal life ==
Nikaido converted to Christianity in adulthood. She died in 1941, aged 60 years. The Japan Women's College of Physical Education continues to train physical educators in Tokyo.
