= Nonoichi Station =

Nonoichi Station may refer to two railway stations in Nonoichi, Ishikawa, Japan:

- Nonoichi Station (Hokutetsu), on the Ishikawa Line, operated by the Hokuriku Railroad
- Nonoichi Station (IR Ishikawa Railway), on the IR Ishikawa Railway Line, operated by the IR Ishikawa Railway
