= Nonoichi Station (Hokutetsu) =

Railway station in Nonoichi, Ishikawa Prefecture, Japan

Nonoichi Station 野々市駅
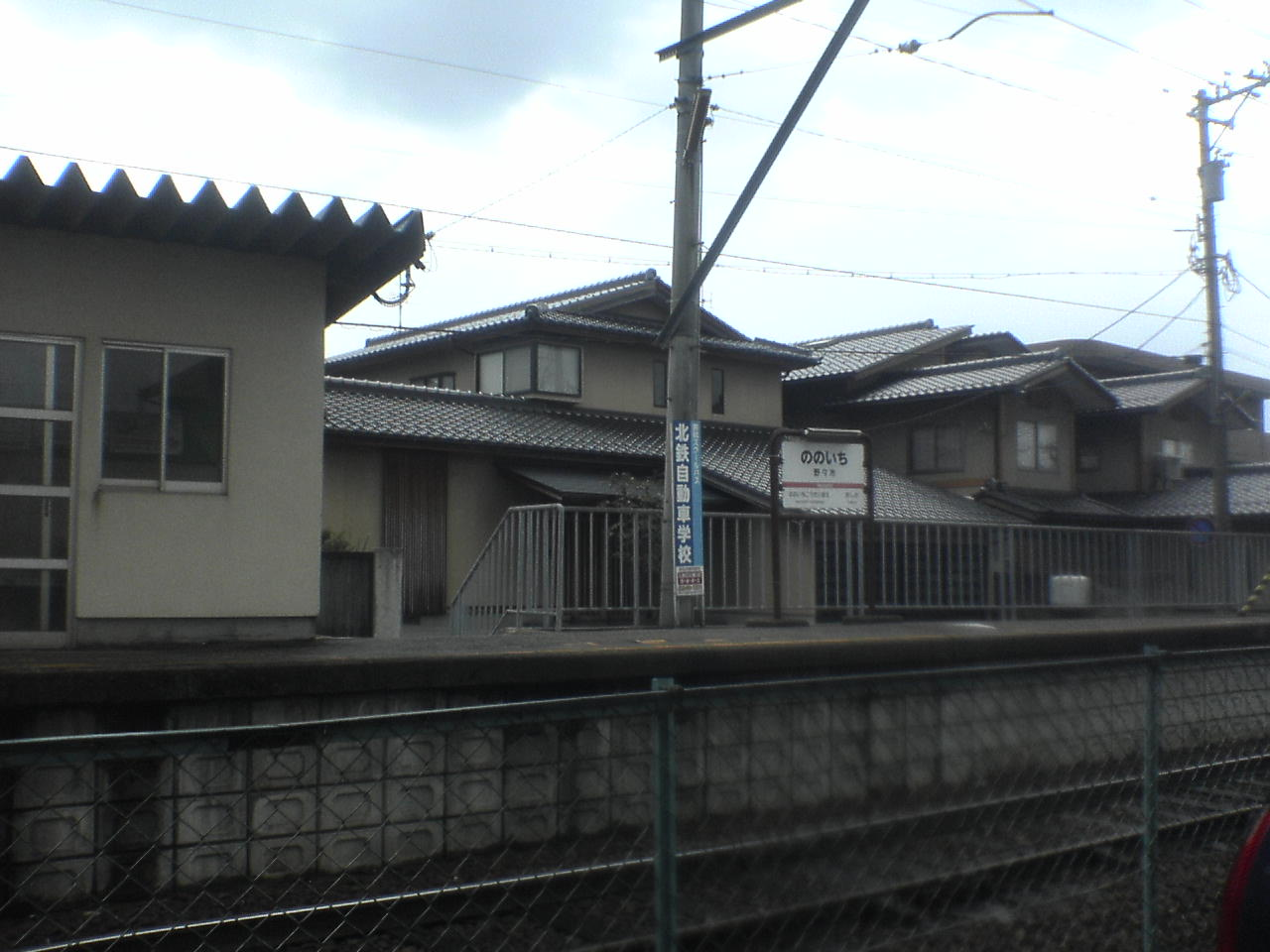
- Nonoichi Station in March 2006

General information
- Location: Honcho 1-chome, Nonoichi-shi, Ishikawa-ken 921-0000; Japan
- Coordinates: 36°32′11.22″N 136°37′15.21″E
- Operator: Hokuriku Railroad
- Line: ■ Hokuriku Railroad Ishikawa Line
- Distance: 4.0 km from Nomachi
- Platforms: 1 side platform
- Tracks: 1

Other information
- Status: Unstaffed
- Website: Official website

History
- Opened: 1 December 1916

Passengers
- FY2015: 69 daily
Location
- Location within Japan

Nonoichi Station (野々市駅, Nonoichi-eki) is a railway station on the Hokuriku Railroad Ishikawa Line in the city of Nonoichi, Ishikawa, Japan, operated by the private railway operator Hokuriku Railroad (Hokutetsu).

== Lines ==
Nonoichi Station is served by the 13.8 km Hokuriku Railroad Ishikawa Line between Nomachi and Tsurugi, and is 4.0 km from the starting point of the line at Nomachi.

== Station layout ==
The station consists of one side platform serving a single bi-directional track. The station is unattended.

== Adjacent stations ==
«	Service	»
Hokuriku Railroad Ishikawa Line
Oshino	Local	Nonoichi-Kōdaimae

== History ==
Nonoichi Station opened on 1 December 1916.

== Surrounding area ==
- Old Hokuriku Highway
- National Route 157
- Nonoichi Public Library
- Nonoichi Municipal Chuo Nursery

== See also ==
- List of railway stations in Japan
