= Inokuchi =

Inokuchi may refer to:

== People ==
- Inokuchi Akuri (井口 阿くり; 1871–1931), Japanese physical educator
- Inokuchi Ariya (井口 在屋; 1856–1923), Japanese mechanical technologist and professor
- Makoto Inokuchi (born 1887), Japanese actor, writer, and translator
- Ricardo Inokuchi, Brazilian table tennis player
- Taku Inokuchi (猪口 拓; born 1982), Japanese former rugby union player
- Yuka Inokuchi (猪口 有佳; born 1978), Japanese voice actress

== Places ==
- Inokuchi Station (Hiroshima), a railway station on Hiroden Miyajima Line in Hiroshima, Japan
- Inokuchi Station (Ishikawa), a railway station on the Hokuriku Railroad Ishikawa Line in Hakusan, Japan
- Inokuchi, Toyama, a village in Japan
