= Japan Women's College of Physical Education =

Coordinates: 35°40′38.3″N 139°35′24.6″E

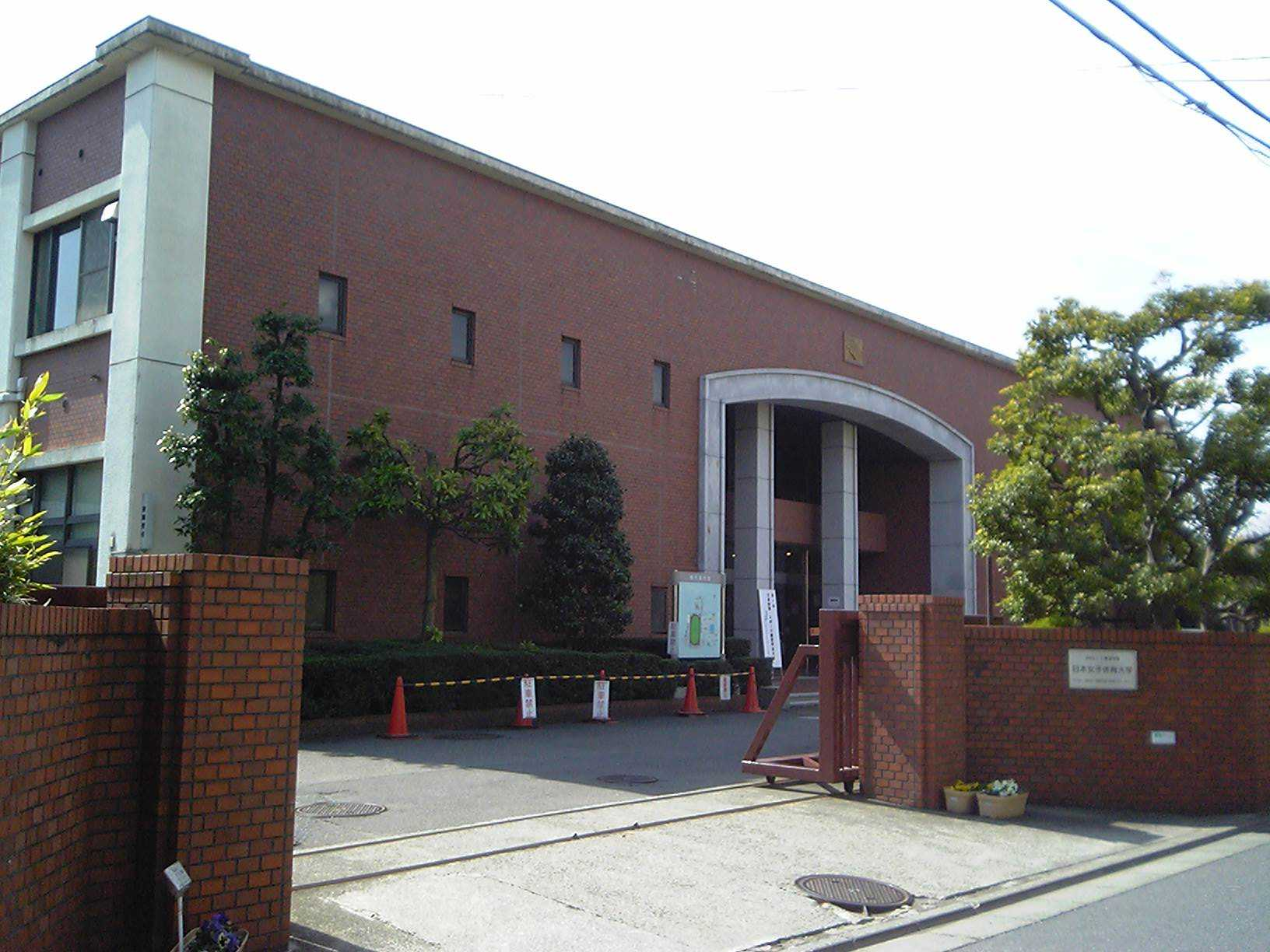
Japan Women's College of Physical Education

Japan Women's College of Physical Education (日本女子体育大学, Nihon joshi taiiku daigaku) is a private university in Setagaya, Tokyo, Japan. The predecessor of the school, a juku, was founded 1922 by Nikaidō Tokuyo. In 1965 it was chartered as a university.

== Access ==
The campus is about 7 minutes by bus and 20 minutes by foot from Chitose-Karasuyama Station on the Keiō Line. It takes about 25 minutes by bus from Kichijōji Station on the JR Chūō Line.
