= Mitsubishi 1MF10 =

Japanese carrier-based fighter prototype

1MF10
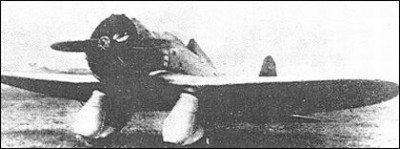
- Mitsubishi 1MF10

General information
- Type: Fighter aircraft
- National origin: Japan
- Manufacturer: Mitsubishi Kokuki KK
- Designer: Jiro Horikoshi
- Status: Prototype
- Number built: 2

History
- First flight: March 1933

The Mitsubishi 1MF10 or Mitsubishi experimental 7-Shi carrier fighter (七試艦上戦闘機) was a prototype Japanese monoplane single-seat carrier-based fighter aircraft of the 1930s. Two were built for the Imperial Japanese Navy, but both were lost in crashes, with no production following.

== Design and development ==
In April 1932, the Imperial Japanese Navy issued a specification for a replacement for its current carrier-based fighter, the Nakajima A2N, asking for designs from both Mitsubishi and Nakajima. Unlike the biplane which was to be replaced, both competitors submitted monoplanes, with Nakajima offering a version of its Type 91 parasol-wing fighter, already in production for the Japanese Army. Mitsubishi assigned design of its contestant to a team led by Jiro Horikoshi, which created the first low-wing cantilever monoplane to be designed in Japan, the Mitsubishi 1MF10.

The 1MF10 was of all-metal construction, with a monocoque duralumin fuselage, with duralumin wing structure covered in fabric, with the pilot accommodated in an open cockpit. The aircraft was powered by a Mitsubishi A4 two-row 14-cylinder radial engine driving a two-bladed propeller. It had a fixed tailwheel undercarriage.

The first prototype 1MF10, with the Navy designation Experimental 7-shi Carrier Fighter (Note: In the Japanese Navy designation system, specifications were given a Shi number based on the year of the Emperor's reign it was issued. In this case 7-Shi stood for 1932, the 7th year of the Shōwa era.) made its maiden flight in March 1933. It was destroyed in July 1933 when its tail broke up during diving tests, although the pilot escaped by parachute. The second prototype had a revised undercarriage, with the main wheels and undercarriage legs faired into streamlined spats. It was also destroyed in a crash, when it could not be recovered from a flat spin in June 1934 by pilot Motoharu Okamura.

Although the design was advanced, it was rejected by the Japanese Navy, having poor handling and not meeting the performance requirements of the specification. It did form the basis of more advanced designs, however, with Horikoshi using elements of it such as the box-spar in the later successful Mitsubishi A5M fighter of similar layout.

== Specifications ==
Data from Japanese Aircraft 1910–1941

General characteristics

- Crew: 1
- Length: 6.92 m (22 ft 8 in)
- Wingspan: 10 m (32 ft 10 in)
- Height: 3.31 m (10 ft 10 in)
- Wing area: 17.70 m^{2} (190.5 sq ft)
- Empty weight: 1,225 kg (2,701 lb)
- Gross weight: 1,578 kg (3,479 lb)
- Powerplant: 1 × Mitsubishi A4 14-cylinder air-cooled radial engine, 580 kW (780 hp)

Performance

- Maximum speed: 320 km/h (199 mph, 173 kn) at 3,000 m (9,800 ft)
- Endurance: 3 hr

Armament

- Guns: 2 × 7.7 mm machine guns

== See also ==
Related development

- Mitsubishi A5M

Aircraft of comparable role, configuration, and era

- Curtiss P-36
- Hawker Hurricane
- Heinkel He 70
- Heinkel He 112
- Messerschmitt Bf 109B
- Nakajima Ki-27
- Polikarpov TsKB-12
- Seversky P-35
- Supermarine Spitfire

Appearances in media

- The Wind Rises
