= Nishi-Kanazawa Station =

Railway station in Kanazawa, Ishikawa Prefecture, Japan

Nishi-Kanazawa Station 西金沢駅
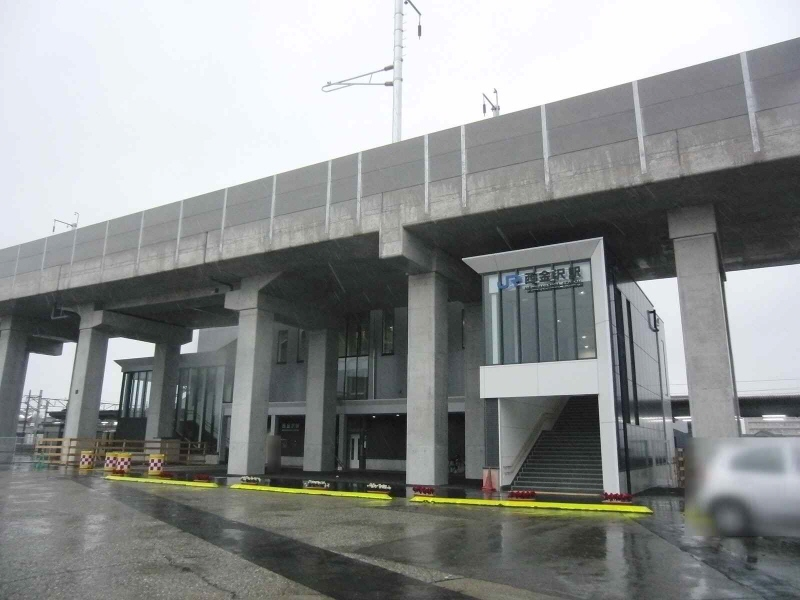
- Nishi-Kanazawa Station in April 2013

General information
- Location: 1-1 Nishi-Kanazawa, Kanazawa City, Ishikawa Prefecture 921-8054; Japan
- Coordinates: 36°33′12″N 136°37′18″E
- Operator: IR Ishikawa Railway
- Line: IR Ishikawa Railway Line
- Distance: 42.7 km (26.5 mi) from Daishōji
- Platforms: 1 island platform
- Tracks: 2
- Connections: Hokuriku Railroad Ishikawa Line (Shin-Nishi-Kanazawa); Bus stop

Other information
- Status: Unstaffed station (automatic ticket vending machine installed)
- Website: Official website

History
- Opened: 1 August 1912; 114 years ago
- Former names: Nonoichi (to 1925)

Passengers
- FY2015: 2,628
Location
- Location within Ishikawa Prefecture Location within Chubu region Location within Japan

Nishi-Kanazawa Station (西金沢駅, Nishi-Kanazawa-eki) is a railway station in the city of Kanazawa, Ishikawa Prefecture, Japan.

== Lines ==
Nishi-Kanazawa Station is served by the IR Ishikawa Railway Line, and is 42.7 kilometers from the start of the line at Daishōji.

== Station layout ==
The station consists of one island platform connected to the station building by a footbridge. The station is unstaffed.

=== Platforms ===
1	■ IR Ishikawa Railway Line	for Komatsu and Fukui
2	■ IR Ishikawa Railway Line	for Kanazawa

== History ==
Nishi-Kanazawa Station opened on 1 August 1912 as Nonoichi Station (野々市駅). It was renamed to its present name on 1 October 1925. With the privatization of Japanese National Railways (JNR) on 1 April 1987, the station came under the control of West Japan Railway Company (JR West).

On 16 March 2024, the station came under the aegis of the IR Ishikawa Railway due to the extension of the Hokuriku Shinkansen from Kanazawa to Tsuruga.

== Adjacent stations ==
«	Service	»
IR Ishikawa Railway Line
Nonoichi	local	Kanazawa

== Passenger statistics ==
In fiscal 2015, the station was used by an average of 2,628 passengers daily (boarding passengers only).

== Gallery ==
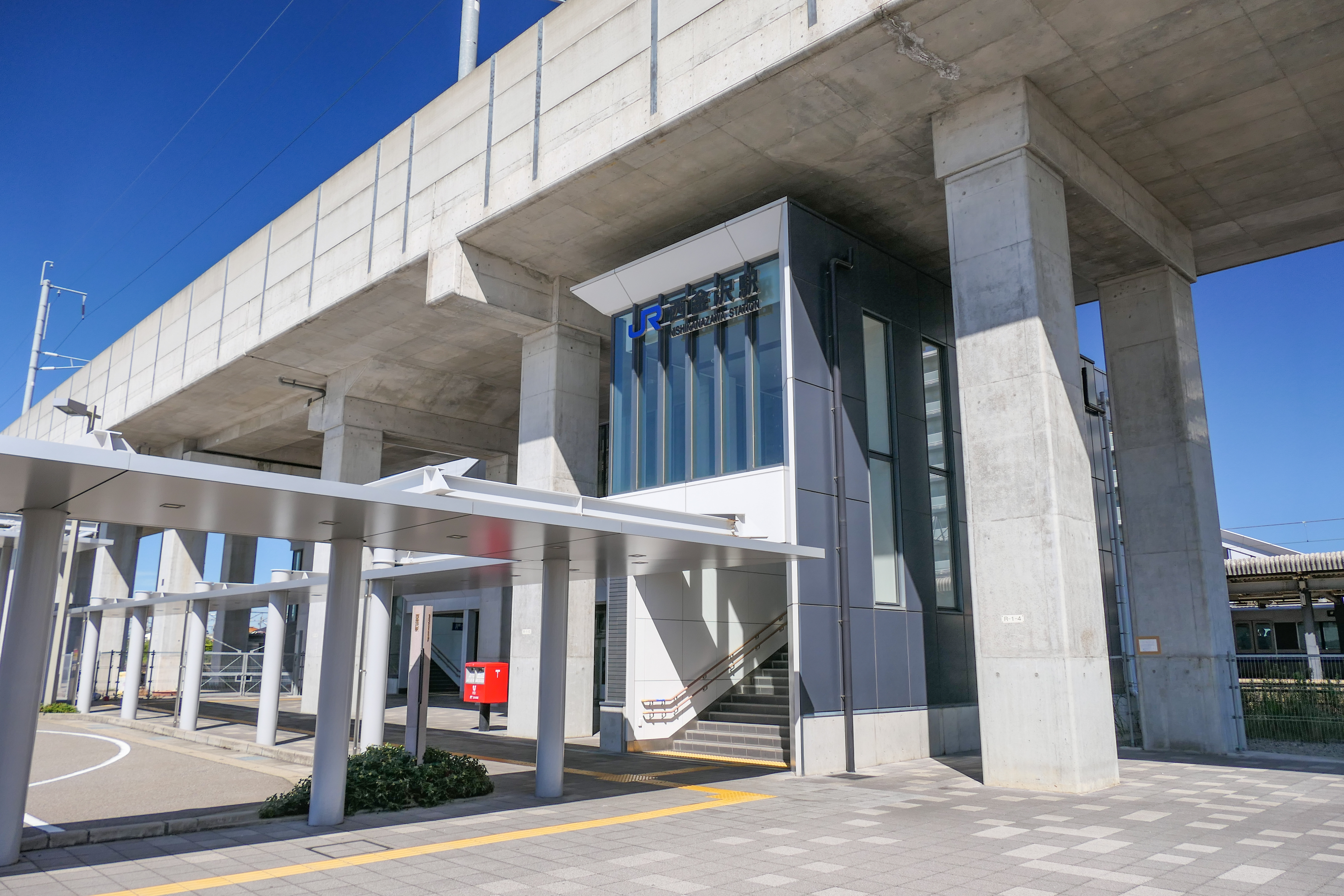
East Exit, July 2022

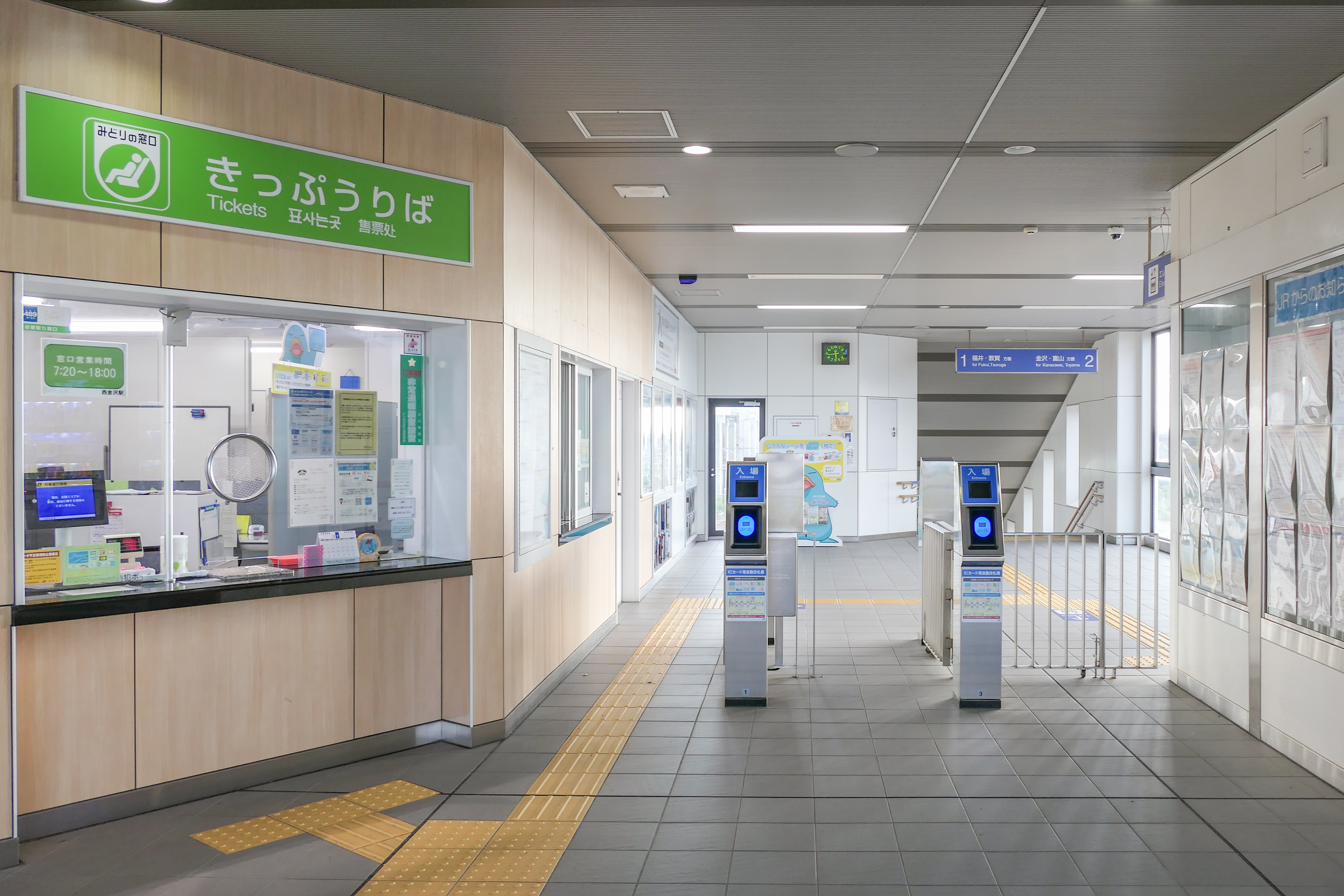
Ticket office and fare gates, July 2022

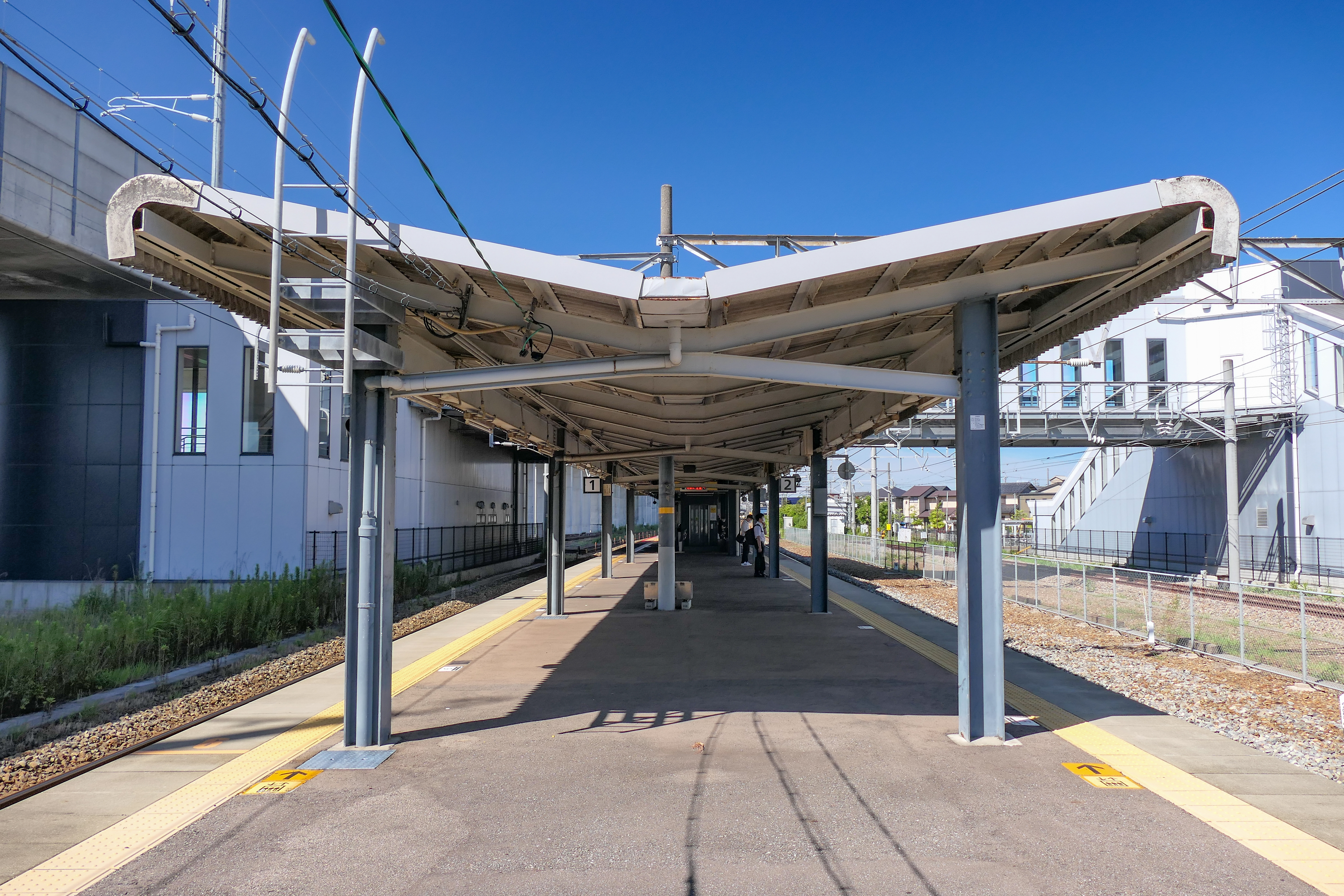
Platforms, July 2022

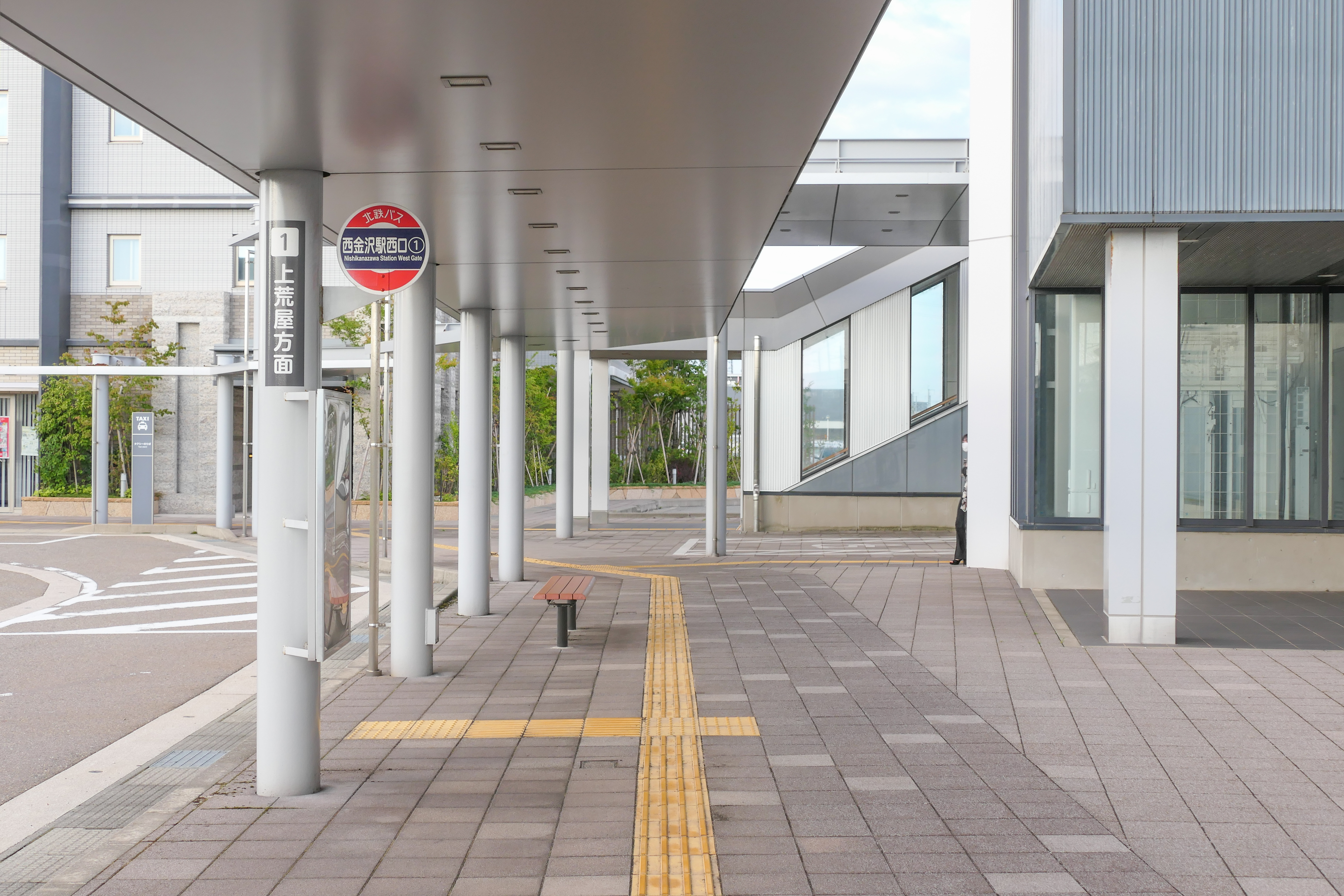
Bus stop by the West Exit, July 2022

== Surrounding area ==
- The Hokuriku Railroad Ishikawa Line is also connected to the station with a separate building named Shin-Nishi-Kanazawa Station located on the east side of the JR station.

== See also ==
- List of railway stations in Japan
