= Hokuriku Railroad Ishikawa Line =

Railway line in Japan

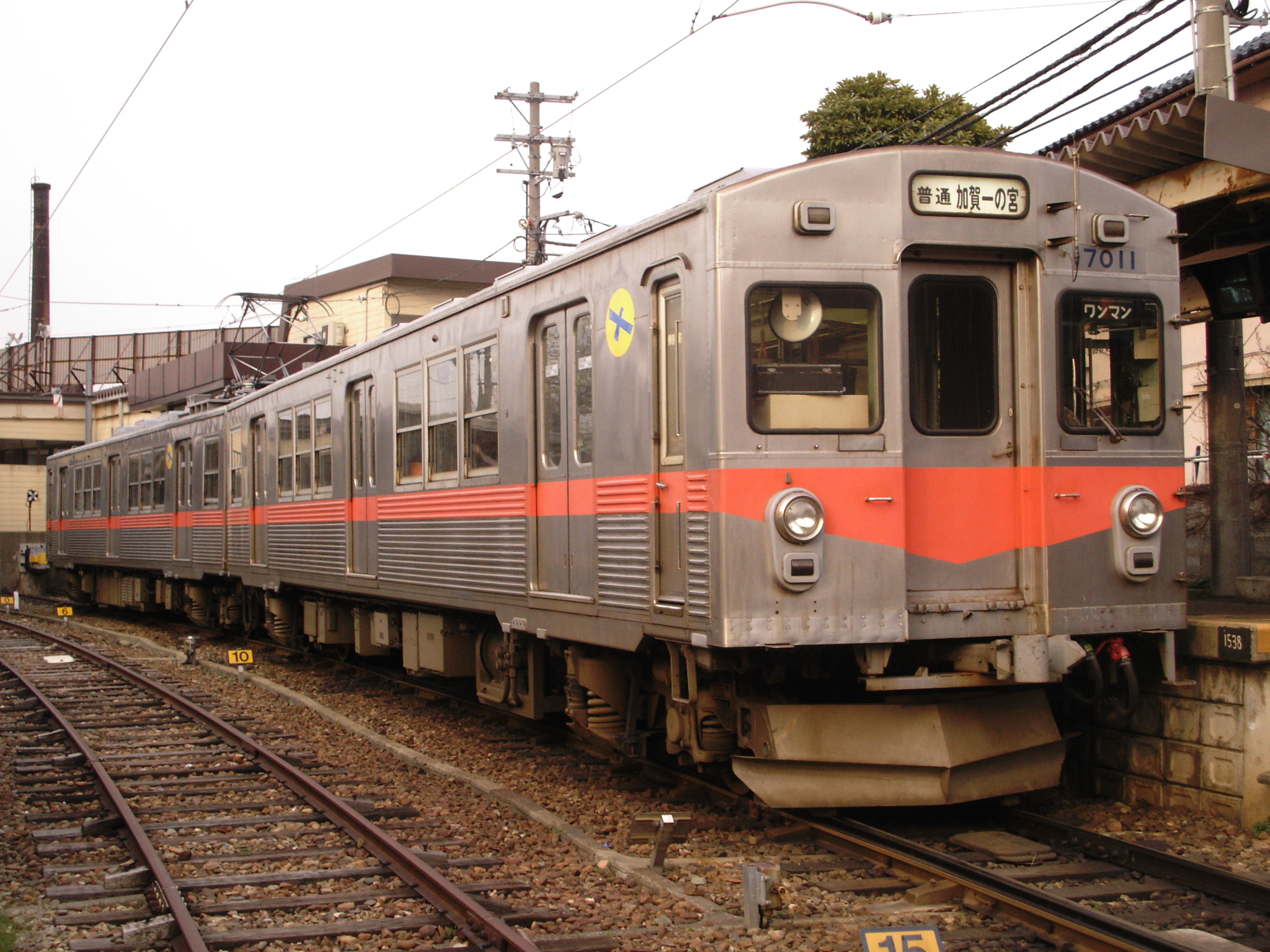
- A Hokuriku Railroad 7000 series EMU at Nomachi Station

Overview
- Native name: 北陸鉄道石川線
- Owner: Hokuriku Railroad
- Locale: Ishikawa Prefecture
- Termini: Nomachi; Tsurugi
- Stations: 17

Service
- Type: Heavy rail

History
- Opened: 1915

Technical
- Line length: 13.8 km (8.57 mi)
- Track gauge: 3 ft 6 in (1,067 mm)
- Electrification: 600 V DC

The Hokuriku Railroad Ishikawa Line (北陸鉄道石川線, Hokuriku Tetsudō Ishikawa-sen) is a railway line owned and operated by Hokuriku Railroad in Ishikawa Prefecture, Japan. The line extends 13.8 km from the city of Kanazawa to Hakusan with a total of 16 stations.

== Service ==
All services are all-stations "Local" trains which travel the entire length of the line, from Nomachi to Tsurugi; the trip takes approximately 30 minutes. During the New Year's Eve and New Year's Day holidays, the line was operated all night to move passengers to and from now-closed Kaga-Ichinomiya, where the nearby Shirayama-Hime Shrine draws crowds.

All trains are operated by drivers only; doors in the middle of each train car do not open.

Until November 30, 2006, there was daytime semi-express service between Nomachi and Tsurugi; trains stopped at Osano, Nonoichi, Sodani, and Oyanagi, making the trip in 25 minutes. This semi-express service was intended to move trains from one part of the line to the other in order to have a more balanced schedule.

On November 1, 2009, the section between Tsurugi and Kaga-Ichinomiya was closed.

== Stations ==
No.	Station	Japanese	Distance (km)		Transfers	Location
No.	Station	Japanese	Between stations	Total	Transfers	Location
I01	Nomachi	野町	-	0.0		Kanazawa
I02	Nishiizumi	西泉	1.0	1.0		Kanazawa
I03	Shin-Nishi-Kanazawa	新西金沢	1.1	2.1	Hokuriku Main Line (Nishi-Kanazawa)	Kanazawa
I04	Oshino	押野	1.3	3.4		Nonoichi
I05	Nonoichi	野々市	0.6	4.0		Nonoichi
I06	Nonoichi-Kōdaimae	野々市工大前	0.5	4.5		Nonoichi
I07	Magae	馬替	1.0	5.5		Kanazawa
I08	Nuka-Jūtakumae	額住宅前	0.6	6.1		Kanazawa
I09	Otomaru	乙丸	0.7	6.8		Kanazawa
I10	Shijima	四十万	1.4	8.2		Kanazawa
I11	Hibari	陽羽里	0.6	8.8		Hakusan
I12	Sodani	曽谷	0.9	9.3		Hakusan
I13	Dōhōji	道法寺	0.6	9.9		Hakusan
I14	Inokuchi	井口	0.8	10.7		Hakusan
I15	Oyanagi	小柳	0.7	11.4		Hakusan
I16	Hinomiko	日御子	0.7	12.1		Hakusan
I17	Tsurugi	鶴来	1.7	13.8		Hakusan

=== Section closed in 2009 ===
Station	Japanese	Distance (km)		Location
Station	Japanese	Between stations	Total	Location
Tsurugi	鶴来駅	-	13.8	Hakusan
Nakatsurugi	中鶴来	0.8	14.6	Hakusan
Kaga-Ichinomiya	加賀一の宮	1.3	15.9	Hakusan

== Rolling stock ==
Hokuriku Railroad uses ten 7000 series (formerly Tokyu 7000 series) and eleven 7700 series (formerly Keio 3000 series) electric multiple units (EMUs) on the Ishikawa Line. They are typically run in paired sets.

== History ==
- June 22, 1915: Ishikawa Electric Railway begins operating the 762mm gauge line between Shin-Nonoichi and Tsurugi stations, not electrified despite the company's name.
- June 30, 1915: Ishikawa Electric Railway renamed to simply Ishikawa Railway
- December 1, 1916: Kami-Nonoichi Station opens
- August 1, 1921: Track gauge changed to 1,067 mm; electrified with 600 V DC overhead catenary
- October 1, 1922: Nishi-Kanazawa — Shin-Nonoichi section opened by Kanazawa Electric Railway, through operation with Ishikawa Railway starts
- May 1, 1923: Kanazawa Electric Railway absorbs Ishikawa Railway
- September 5, 1925: Hinomiko Station opens
- October 1, 1925: Nishi-Kanazawa Station renamed to Shiragikuchō Station; Shin-Nonoichi Station renamed to Shin-Nishi-Kanazawa Station; Kami-Nonoichi Station renamed to Nonoichi Station
- August 17, 1927: Sanjūgari Station opens
- December 28, 1927: Kinmei Railway opens Tsurugi — Jinjamae (now Kaga-Ichinomiya) section
- March 11, 1929: Tsurugi — Jinjamae section transferred to Kanazawa Electric Railway
- September 14, 1929: Tsurugi — Jinjamae section electrified
- December 1, 1934: Nishi-Izumi Station opens
- March 2, 1935: Awada Station opens
- August 1, 1937: Inokuchi Station opens
- December 8, 1937: Jinjamae Station renamed to Kaga-Ichinomiya Station
- August 1, 1941: Hokuriku Gōdō Electric (now Hokuriku Electric Power Company) established; merges with Kanazawa Electric Railway
- March 26, 1942: Hokuriku Gōdō Electric spins-off its transport division, establishes Hokuriku Railway
- February 1, 1943: Magae Station opens
- October 13, 1943: Hokuriku Railway, Kanaishi Electric Railway, Onsen Rail, Kinmei Railway, Noto Railway, etc. merge to form Hokuriku Railway
- October 23, 1944: Through operation with the Shōkin Line begins
- After 1946: Sanjūgari, Tsukihachi stations close
- June 2, 1949: Through operation with the Nōmi Line begins
- After April 1963: Awada Station renamed to Otomaru Station
- April 11, 1963: Kami-Nonoichi Station renamed to Kōsen-Mae Station
- July 15, 1965: Ōnuke Station renamed to Nuke-Jūtaku-Mae Station
- September 15, 1966: Kōsen-Mae Station renamed to Nonoichi-Kōdai-Mae Station
- April 1, 1970: Passenger operations on the Shiragikuchō — Nomachi section cease; freight-only operation continues
- September 20, 1972: Shiragikuchō — Nomachi section closes
- April 1, 1976: Freight operations cease
- September 14, 1980: Nōmi Line closes
- December 12, 1984: Kinmei Line operation stops
- April 29, 1987: Kinmei Line closes
- July 24, 1990: Driver-only operation begins
- 2002: Automatic Train Stop (ATS) system introduced
- December 1, 2006: Semi-express trains abolished; entire line changes to local-only operation
- November 1, 2009: Tsurugi — Kaga-Ichinomiya section closes
- March 14, 2015: Hibari station opens

=== Former connecting lines ===
- Nomachi Station: In 1904, the 8 km, 915 mm gauge Matsukane horse-drawn tramway opened to Matto on the Hokuriku Main Line, and also connected with Nonoichi station on this line (not the current JR West station of the same name, which opened in 1968). In 1916, the line was converted to 1,067 mm gauge and electrified at 600 V DC. The line was acquired by the Kanazawa Electric Railway in 1920, which merged with the Hokuriku Railway in 1942. The 3 km Nonoichi to Nomachi section closed in 1944, and the remaining 5 km line closed in 1955.
- Tsurugi Station: The 17 km line to Yamashita was opened between 1926 and 1929, and electrified in 1949. Freight services ceased in 1971, and the line closed in 1983 after the Dainichigawa bridge was damaged by floodwaters. This forced the trains to stop running, and the line officially closed in 1987. The Nomi Electric Railway opened as a 17 km line, electrified at 600 V DC to Terai on the Hokuriku Main Line in 1927. Flooding destroyed the Tedorigawa bridge in 1934, which was replaced nine months later. The company merged with the Hokuriku Railway in 1942. Freight services ceased in 1968, and the line closed in 1980.

== See also ==
- List of railway lines in Japan
