= Inokuchi Akuri =

Japanese physical educator

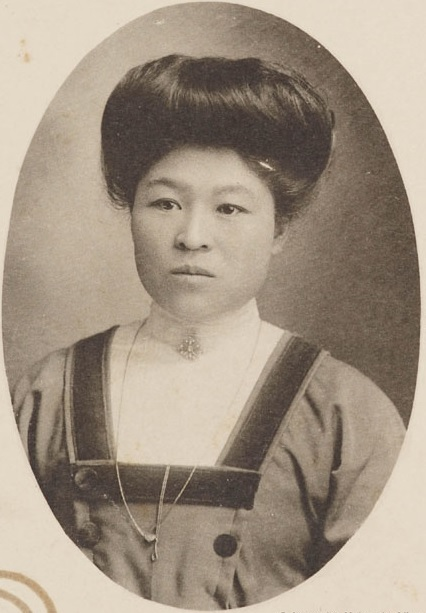
- Inokuchi Akuri, from a photograph taken before 1912.
- Born: January 12, 1871; Akita
- Died: March 26, 1931
- Other names: Inoguchi Aguri, Fujita Akuri, Akuri Inokuchi
- Occupation: Physical educator

Inokuchi Akuri (井口阿くり) (January 12, 1871 – March 26, 1931) was a Japanese physical educator.

== Early life ==
Inokuchi Akuri was born in Akita Prefecture. Sponsored by the Japanese government, she attended Smith College and Wellesley College, and studied physical education with Senda Berenson at the Boston Normal School of Gymnastics, founded by Mary Tileston Hemenway. "There is a great desire to make women strong in Japan," she explained to a Boston newspaper in 1901, "and so my government sent me over here to study how to increase our women's strength."

== Career ==
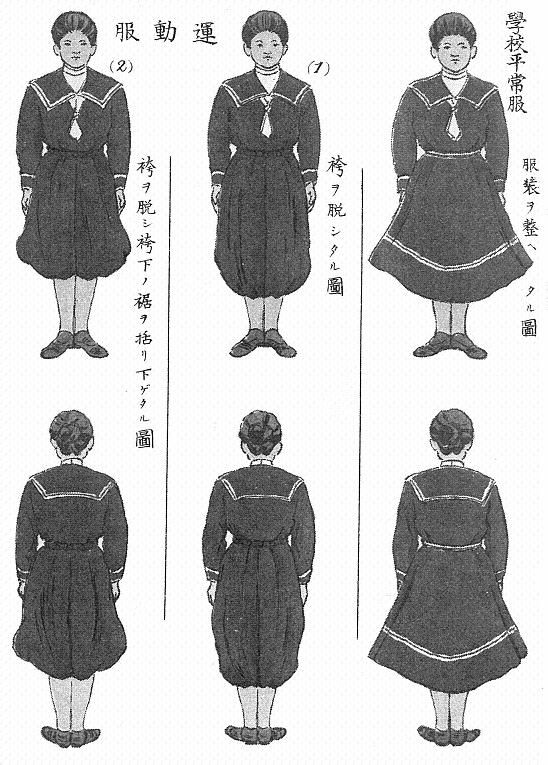
Sport clothes designed by Inokuchi Akuri 01

Inokuchi was a teacher in Tokyo before her time in the United States. On her return to Japan in 1903, Inokuchi taught physical education at Girls' High School in Tokyo, and introduced a women's exercise costume of bloomers and middy blouses and calf-length skirts, for comfortable vigorous movement. She published a report, Taiiku no riron oyobi jissai (Theory and Practice of Physical Education) in 1906. She is considered one of the pioneers of women's modern physical education in Japan.

Inokuchi also taught in the imperial household for a time, and was head of a girls' school in Taipei.

== Personal life ==
Inokuchi married in 1911, and was known as Fujita Akuri. The couple spent a brief time living in San Francisco, and in the 1920s she traveled to London as a tutor. She died in 1931, aged 60 years.
