= Nomachi Station =

Railway station in Kanazawa, Ishikawa Prefecture, Japan

Nomachi Station 野町駅
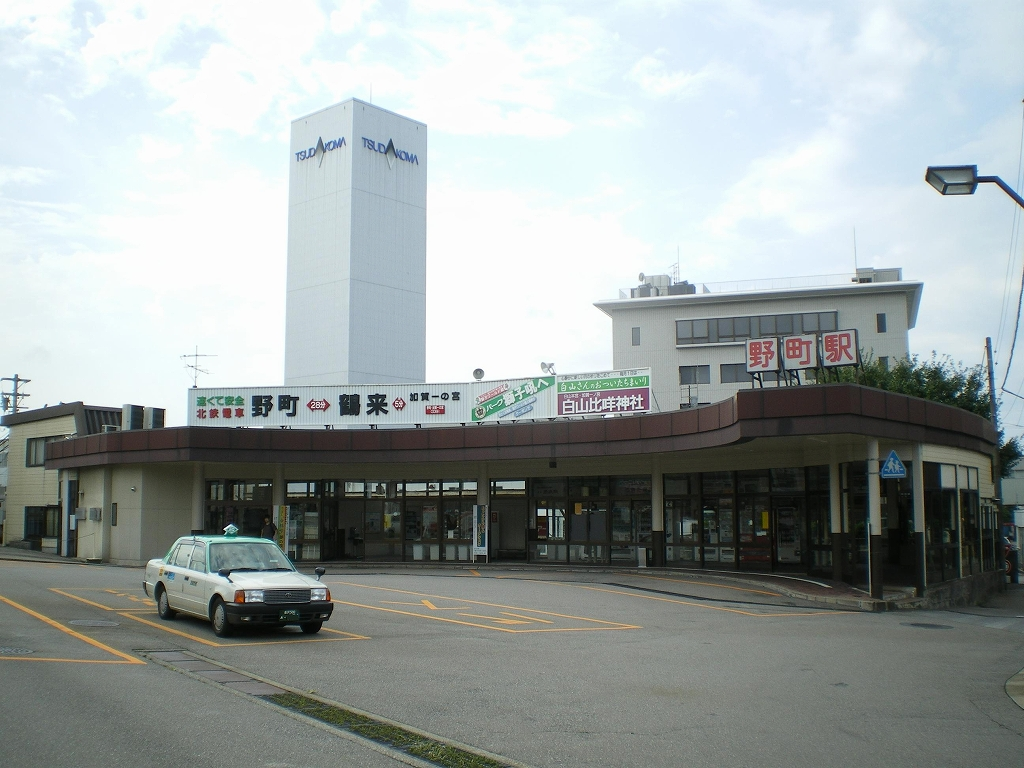
- Nomachi Station plaza, September 2009

General information
- Location: Nomachi 5-chome, Kanazawa-shi, Ishikawa-ken 921-8031; Japan
- Coordinates: 36°33′14″N 136°38′40″E
- Operator: Hokuriku Railroad
- Line: ■ Ishikawa Line
- Distance: 13.8 km from Tsurugi
- Platforms: 2 bay platforms
- Connections: Bus stop

Other information
- Status: Staffed
- Website: Official website

History
- Opened: 1 December 1916

Services
Preceding station	Hokuriku Railroad	Following station
Terminus	Ishikawa Line	Nishiizumi towards Tsurugi
Location
- Location within Japan

Nomachi Station (野町駅, Nomachi-eki) is a railway station on the Hokuriku Railroad Ishikawa Line, in the city of Kanazawa, Ishikawa, Japan, operated by the private railway operator Hokuriku Railroad.

== Lines ==
Nomachi Station is the terminus of the 13.8 km Hokuriku Railroad Ishikawa Line to Tsurugi.

== Station layout ==
The station consists of two bay platforms serving two tracks.

== History ==
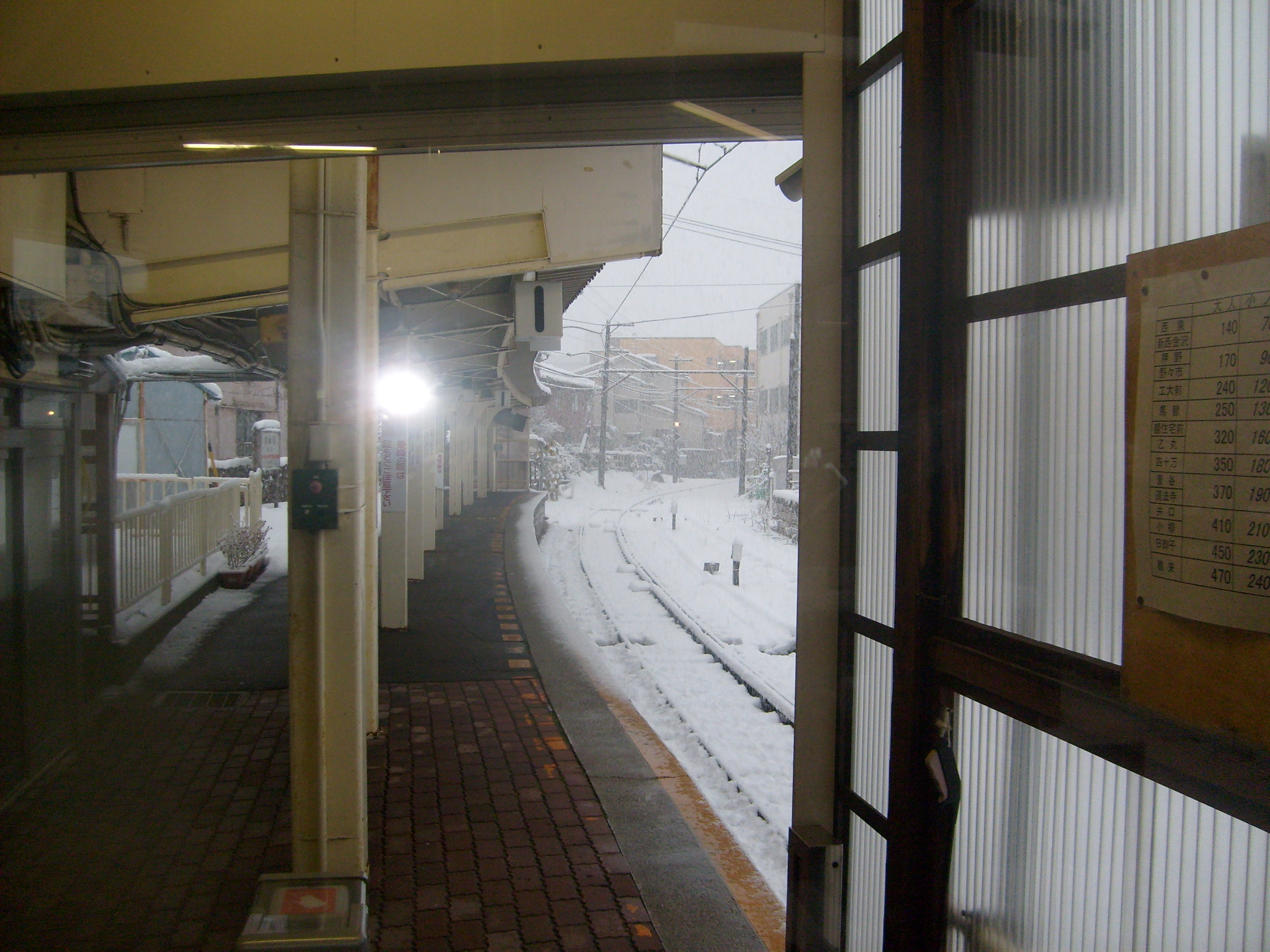
View along the currently operational platform at Nomachi Station

Nomachi Station opened on 1 October 1922. The station became the terminus of the Ishikawa Line when the section between Nomachi and Shiragikuchō was closed on September 20, 1972.

== Surrounding area ==
- Tsudakoma Corporation Headquarters
- Fujitsu Hokuriku Systems Headquarters
- Ishikawa Prefectural Kanazawa Central High School
- Kanazawa Tatsuizumi Junior High School
- Apita Kanazawa Shop
- Manten Spa Kanazawa
- Nishi Chaya (Old town)
- Ninja Temple
- Nomachi Station branch office
- APA Hotel Kanazawa Nomachi

== See also ==
- List of railway stations in Japan
