= Tsurugi Station =

Railway station in Hakusan, Ishikawa Prefecture, Japan

Tsurugi Station 鶴来駅
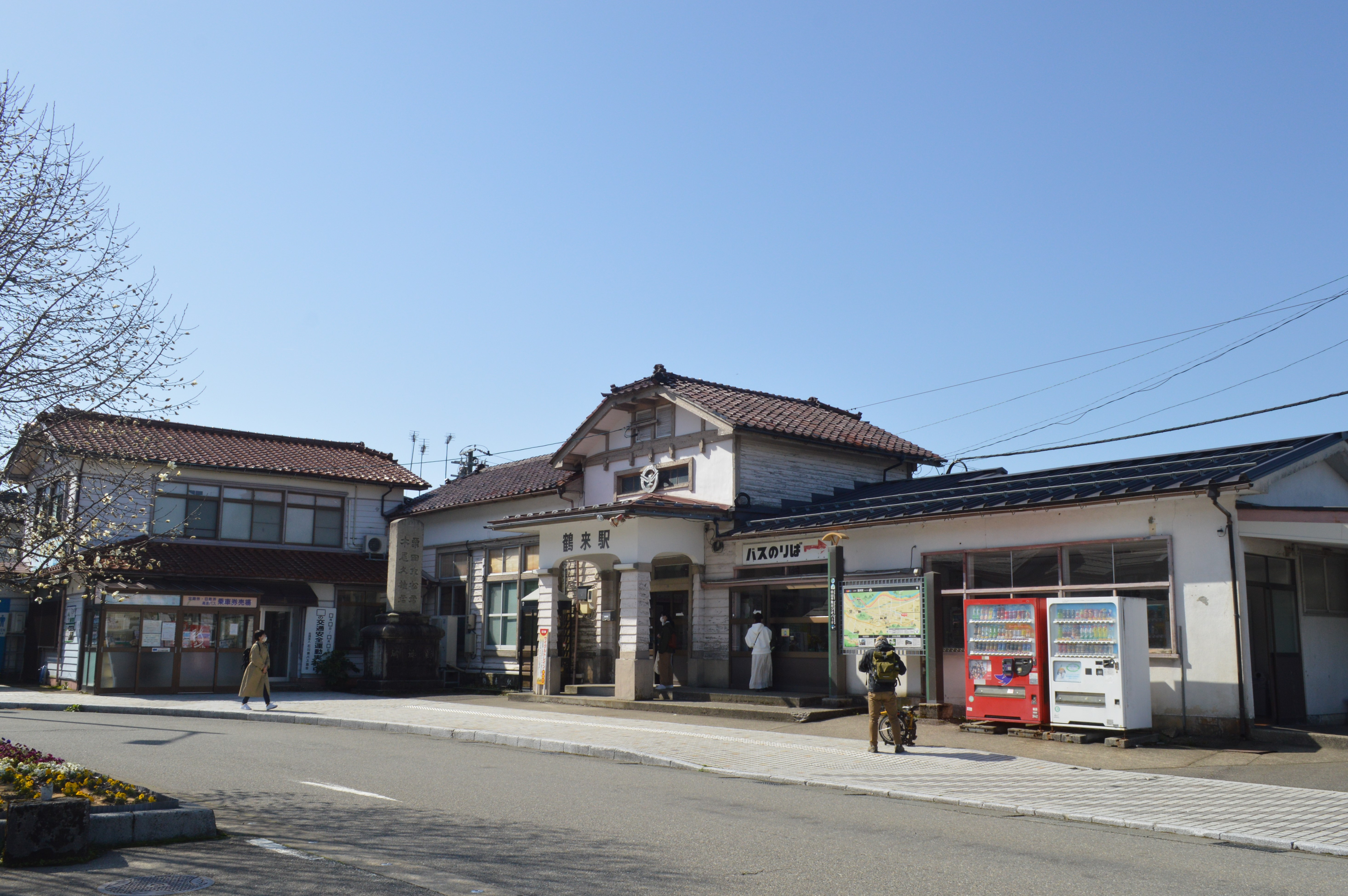
- Tsurugi Station building in March 2021

General information
- Location: Tsurugihonmachi 4-chome, Hakusanshi, Ishikawa-ken 920-2121; Japan
- Coordinates: 36°27′7.9″N 136°37′26.3″E
- Operator: Hokuriku Railroad
- Line: ■ Hokuriku Railroad Ishikawa Line
- Distance: 13.8 km from Nomachi
- Platforms: 2 side platforms
- Tracks: 2
- Connections: Bus stop

Other information
- Status: Staffed
- Website: Official website

History
- Opened: 22 June 1915

Passengers
- FY2015: 1070daily
Location
- Location within Japan

Tsurugi Station (鶴来駅, Tsurugi-eki) is a railway station on the Hokuriku Railroad Ishikawa Line in Hakusan, Ishikawa, Japan, operated by the private railway operator Hokuriku Railroad (Hokutetsu).

== Lines ==
Tsurugi Station is southern terminus of the 13.8 km Hokuriku Railroad Ishikawa Line from Nomachi.

== Station layout ==
The station consists of two side platforms serving two tracks. The station is staffed.

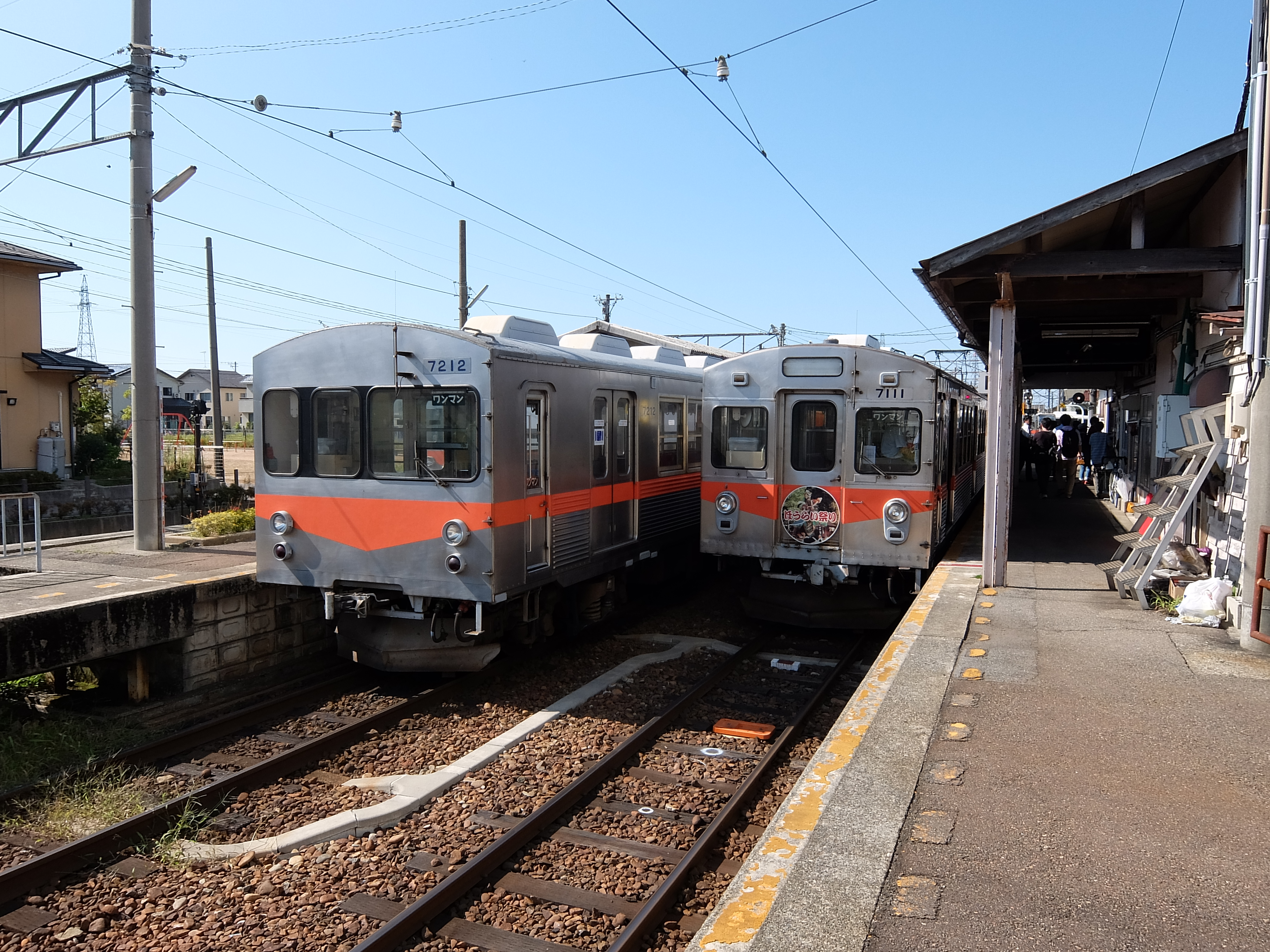
The station platforms in September 2014

== Adjacent stations ==
«	Service	»
Hokuriku Railroad Ishikawa Line
Hinomiko	Local	Terminus

== History ==
Tsurugi Station opened on 22 June 1915.

== Passenger statistics ==
In fiscal 2011, the station was used by an average of 830 passengers daily.

== Surrounding area ==
- Tsurugi Town Office
- Tsurugi High School
- Tsurugi Junior High School
- Tsurugi Post Office
- Kaga Hakusan Bus Headquarters
- National Route 157
- Ishikawa Prefectural Route 45
- Ishikawa Prefectural Route 179

== See also ==
- List of railway stations in Japan
