= Asano River =

River in Kanazawa, Ishikawa, Japan

Coordinates: 36°33′27.3″N 136°40′56.6″E

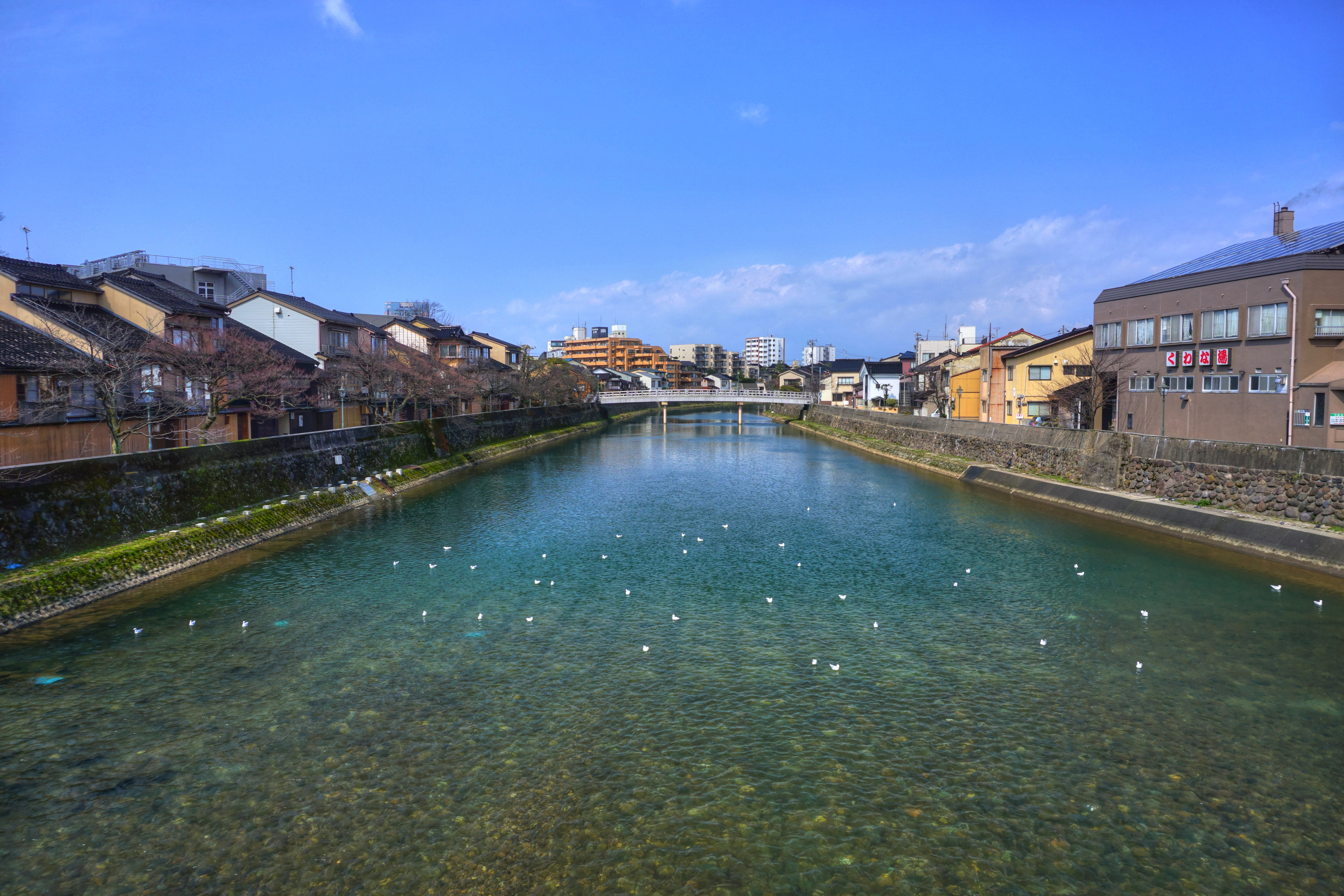

- Location within Japan
- Native name: 浅野川 (Japanese)

Location
- Country: Japan
- Prefecture: Ishikawa
- City: Kanazawa

Physical characteristics
- Mouth: Ono River
  - location: Kanazawa and Uchinada

The Asano River (Japanese: 浅野川; romaji: Asano Gawa) is a river in Kanazawa, Ishikawa Prefecture, Japan.

== History ==
In 1953, a flood on the river destroyed all of the bridges over the river except Asanogawa-ohashi Bridge. Due to the continuous flood on the river over the years, a watercourse was constructed in 1974 to mitigate the flood. Nevertheless, another flood occurred in 2008.

== Bridges ==
Bridges that cross the river from upstream to downstream are Shimotagamibashi Bridge, Asahibashi Bridge, Wakamatsubashi Bridge, Kenrokuayumibashi Bridge, Suzumibashi Bridge, Tokiwabashi Bridge, Tenjinbashi Bridge, Umenohashi Bridge, Asanogawa-ohashi Bridge, Nakanohashi Bridge, Kobashi Bridge, Hikoso-ohashi Bridge, Shoeibashi Bridge and Nakajima-ohashi Bridge.

== Facilities ==
The river is equipped with walking path along it from Tokiwabashi Bridge to Nakajima-ohashi Bridge.

== Transportation ==
The river is accessible from Kagatsume Station, Kitama Station, Okobata Station, Mitsuya Station, Mitsukuchi Station, Waridashi Station, Isobe Station, Kami-Moroe Station and Nanatsuya Station of Hokuriku Railroad.
