= Shakai Times =

Japanese political newspaper, 1952–1995

- Native name: 社会タイムス
- Type: Political newspaper
- Founded: 1952
- Ceased publication: 15 December 1995
- Political alignment: Left-wing / socialist
- Language: Japanese
- Headquarters: Tokyo (initially); later Osaka / Kansai

Shakai Times (社会タイムス, Shakai Taimusu) was a political newspaper associated with the left wing of the Japan Socialist Party. It was initially launched as the organ of the Left Socialist Party of Japan, but ran into financial difficulties after only two years. Thereafter it continued to be published in the Kansai region by a small group of activists until 1995.

== Daily Shakai Times ==
In 1952, Saburō Eda, who believed that socialist parties needed a daily organ newspaper, took the lead in founding the paper. To keep it independent of the Left Socialist Party, a separate company, the Shakai Times Company (株式会社社会タイムス社), was established. Literary critic Suekichi Aono was appointed president (representative director and editor-in-chief), with Eda as managing director (専務取締役). Other progressive intellectuals of the time also cooperated, including sociologist Ikutarō Shimizu as a director, novelist Torahiko Tamiya who serialized a novel, and cartoonist Yoshirō Katō who contributed cartoons. Among the directors was also Minoru Takano of Sōhyō. Major shareholders included the Japan Teachers' Union, the Socialist Party, the Coal Miners' Union, the All Japan Postal Workers' Union, the Private Railway Workers' Union, the Electric Power Workers' Union, and the National Railway Workers' Union.

Among the reporters were former staff of the Japan Socialist Party organ from before the split, as well as journalists newly hired after being dismissed from newspapers in the Red Purge (facilitated by Eda, who was not rigidly ideological).

Because skilled reporters dismissed in the Red Purge wrote for it, the paper was said to sell rapidly thanks to the interest of its content (early circulation figures of over 100,000 have been claimed in some accounts, though contemporary encyclopedic sources give a peak of around 40,000 that later fell to 25,000–26,000). Its editorial stance opposed the Reverse Course and rearmament and called for unarmed neutrality, in line with Left Socialist Party policy. The inaugural issue also stated the ambition of extensively covering social-movement developments that commercial papers rarely reported. Some of the Red Purge journalists arbitrarily published views of the Japanese Communist Party, which repeatedly caused friction within the Left Socialist Party.

As Matsuta Hosoya of Shin Sanbetsu (National Federation of Industrial Organizations) had predicted—"It is too early for the Left Socialist Party to have a daily organ; it will soon hit a wall"—financial difficulties were a concern from the start despite the editorial staff's enthusiasm. Exactly as Hosoya forecast, the company soon ran into trouble. Branches of the Left Socialist Party and labor unions to which distribution had been entrusted treated the paper as free, distributing it to party members and union members without collecting subscription fees. Failure to collect accounts receivable led to the bankruptcy of the Shakai Times Company after only two years (publication of the daily edition ran from 1 March 1952 to 31 May 1954). Large debts remained; Kaoru Ōta claimed they were pushed onto Hiroo Wada, a Left Socialist Party leader. Left Socialist Party figures countered that the debts were repaid by selling the Left Socialist Party's office, which had become unnecessary after the formation of Sōhyō (General Council of Trade Unions of Japan) and the reunification of the Socialist parties.

What can be stated clearly is that the bankruptcy of the Shakai Times Company damaged confidence in Saburō Eda, the leading advocate of a daily organ, within the left wing. This later had a negative effect on Eda during the structural-reform debate.

In 1957 a new company, Shakai Times Shinsha, was formed in Tokyo in an attempt to revive the paper as a weekly, but it failed and folded in 1960. The editor-in-chief at that time was Shinzō Shimizu.

The failure of Shakai Times long dampened enthusiasm for organ-paper activity in the Japan Socialist Party, especially on the left. When Masahiro Yamamoto of the Socialist Association became director of the party's Organ Paper Bureau in the 1970s, he and others repeatedly stressed, citing the Shakai Times example, that organ-paper work included regular distribution and collection of fees. The major expansion of Shakai Shimpō and elimination of accumulated deficits during Yamamoto's tenure can also be seen as lessons drawn from Shakai Times.

== Osaka Shakai Times ==
Even after publication of Shakai Times stalled in Tokyo, limited publication continued in Osaka. Initially issued as a Kansai edition by the Kansai General Bureau of the Shakai Times Company, it was later published by Shakai Times Kyōdō Insatsu-sha. At that time it was a thrice-monthly paper serving as a promotional sheet for the printing company. When the company decided to discontinue Shakai Times because of its own financial difficulties, three employees opposed the decision, left the firm in 1966, and continued publishing the paper independently.

== Weekly Shakai Times ==
Reviving Shakai Times—which had been reduced to a company promotional sheet—as a political newspaper again and expanding its readership was extremely difficult. Nevertheless, the staff persevered through delayed and unpaid salaries and kept the paper going. At its peak, circulation is said to have reached 20,000. The editorial core belonged to the Ōta faction of the Socialist Association and, from that standpoint, covered developments in the Japan Socialist Party as well as various social issues, including the Kim Dae-jung kidnapping incident. However, as the "DSP–Kōmeitō–JSP line" (shakōmin line) gained strength within the Kansai Socialist Party in order to counter the strong Japanese Communist Party presence in the region, the editorial staff of the weekly Shakai Times split over the alliance. The anti-alliance faction left and founded the paper People; the pro-alliance faction continued publishing Shakai Times for a time, but it disappeared with the "long-term suspension" of issue No. 1518 dated 15 December 1995, just before the dissolution of the Japan Socialist Party. The notice "On the Long-Term Suspension of This Paper" in that issue stated: "Fifty years after the defeat in the war, the historical role of the Japan Socialist Party has ended. With changes in domestic and international conditions, the role of Shakai Times, which supported the Japan Socialist Party, has also largely ended, and the sense of loneliness is all the greater." Thus the more-than-40-year history of Shakai Times came to a close.

Nevertheless, many journalists and civic activists emerged from among those involved with Shakai Times, and the paper can be said to have exerted a certain influence on the history of postwar Japanese journalism and social movements.
