= Shakai Shimpō =

Japanese political newspaper

- Type: Weekly newspaper
- Format: Tabloid
- Owner(s): Social Democratic Party Organ Paper and Publicity Bureau
- Editor-in-chief: Minoru Tanaka
- Founded: 13 October 1955
- Language: Japanese
- Headquarters: 5th floor, Maruki Enomoto Building, 3-18-17 Minato, Chūō, Tokyo
- Circulation: approx. 50,000 (2021)
- Price: ¥185 (single copy) ¥720 (monthly subscription)
- Website: sdp.or.jp/sdp-paper/

Shakai Shimpō (社会新報, Shakai Shinpō) is the central organ newspaper of the Japan Socialist Party and its successor, the Social Democratic Party.

== Origins ==
The prehistory of Shakai Shimpō includes the party organ Shakai Shimbun issued immediately after the founding of the Japan Socialist Party on 2 November 1945, and the quasi-organ Shakai Times issued by the Left Socialist Party of Japan after the left–right split of 1951.

The Japan Socialist Party’s first party organ, Shakai Shimbun, was initially published as Nihon Shakai Shimbun from January 1946 to March 1952. It began as a monthly (blanket format, 2 pages). It was soon renamed Shakai Shimbun, converted to a weekly, and made a paid publication. This Shakai Shimbun was operated on an independent profit basis separate from the party organization. At its peak it was published twice weekly with 4 pages and a circulation of 170,000.

The other predecessor, Shakai Times, developed from the Left Socialist Party’s organ Tō Katsudō (launched as Tō Katsudō Shiryō on 1 November 1951 and renamed Tō Katsudō from the 10 March 1952 issue) into the quasi-organ Shakai Times (daily, blanket format, 4 pages). After the left–right split, the Left Socialist Party and Sōhyō cooperated to assemble scholars and cultural figures and established the Shakai Times Company, Ltd. Suekichi Aono (chairman of the Japan Writers’ Association) became company president, Saburō Eda managing director, sociologist Ikutarō Shimizu and Sōhyō general secretary Minoru Takano directors, and Left Socialist Party chairman Mosaburō Suzuki auditor. Shimizu served as the first editor-in-chief. Many journalists dismissed in the Red Purge and progressive intellectuals of the time were involved in the editing. However, the daily Shakai Times fell into financial difficulties due to inadequate editorial structure, occasional divergence of editorial policy from the party and Sōhyō, and incomplete distribution networks, and ceased publication in May 1954 after two years and two months, without waiting for the reunification of the left and right Socialist parties.

On the occasion of the reunification of the left and right wings of the Japan Socialist Party in October 1955, the paper was renamed Shakai Shimpō and issued as a free weekly in blanket format with 2 pages. Five years later, in 1960, Shakai Shimpō became a paid weekly in blanket format with 4 pages, and from 1966 it moved to twice-weekly publication in blanket format with 8 pages. Twice-weekly publication continued thereafter until June 2002, when it switched to a weekly tabloid format with 16 pages; it is currently a weekly tabloid with 8 pages.

== Overview as a medium of political propaganda ==
Including the Japan Socialist Party era, peak circulation reached 560,000 copies; as of November 2006 it stood at 150,000. Readership showed strong regional variation and was especially widespread in coal-mining areas of Sorachi District, Hokkaido, and the Chikuhō region of Fukuoka Prefecture, where the Japan Coal Miners’ Union and the National Railway Workers’ Union exerted strong influence. The paper formerly carried regional pages organized by blocks. Conversion to a daily had long been under consideration; the Left Socialist Party’s quasi-organ Shakai Times had been issued as a daily for two years and two months, but after that setback the daily format was never revived, and the process culminated in the threefold split of the Japan Socialist Party in 1996 (into the Democratic Party, the Social Democratic Party, and the New Socialist Party). As the organ of the Social Democratic Party, Shakai Shimpō has continued as a weekly tabloid with 8 pages to the present. Extra editions introducing policies are issued before the official announcement of national or local elections. Local editions of Shakai Shimpō published by regional organizations also exist. In areas where the Social Democratic Party is strong, events such as “Shakai Shimpō festivals” are held.

The paper had a policy of not accepting advertising from large corporations, but from fiscal 1987 it established internal regulations and began carrying such advertising. The first large-corporation advertisement to appear in Shakai Shimpō was for Shiseido on 28 July 1987.

The former publisher was the Japan Socialist Party Organ Paper Bureau (front page of that period). It is now handled by the Social Democratic Party National Union Organ Paper and Publicity Bureau. The monthly subscription is ¥720 (including postage + ¥168). Anyone, not only party members, may subscribe by concluding a regular subscription contract (half-year or one-year). When party members or cooperating members subscribe, the relevant regional or workplace general branch or branch handles dispatch, and rebate or subsidy funds are provided by the National Union according to the number of copies (front page as of 2010).

During the Socialist Party era circulation was maintained at 400,000, but the threefold split of 1996 into the Democratic Party, Social Democratic Party and New Socialist Party caused a sharp decline. Although distribution networks weakened owing to the party’s decline and the aging of its membership, the paper still claimed a circulation of 140,000 as of 2011. This was due to the existence of loyal “Shimpō fans” throughout the country, and the paper has remained a powerful pillar of the Social Democratic Party’s finances and organizational strength. In recent years the serial “Mizuho Fukushima: Dialogues on Life,” in which party leader Mizuho Fukushima converses with cultural figures, has been compiled into a book. The paper has also carried scoop articles on the 2007 bribery scandal involving Administrative Vice-Minister of Defense Takemasa Moriya and the defense trading company Yamada Corporation, and the large-scale tax-evasion case involving Managing Director Naoki Akiyama of the Japan–U.S. Peace and Cultural Exchange Association. Detailed Diet reports appear on pages 1–3. Columns include Tōru Hayano’s “Reading Politics,” Yū Uno’s economics column, and overseas correspondent Kiyoshi Ueno’s Latin America reports.

In January 2010 the 12th Regular National Convention adopted Proposal No. 1 calling for “substantial page reform at an early date.” On this basis a page reform was carried out with the 3 March 2010 issue (No. 4579) (change of masthead and layout, enlargement of type, redesign of the readers’ column, and creation of a local-government page). The paper was then a tabloid of 16 pages printed in black and blue.

Printing is handled by Printing Center Co., Ltd. (now Kōhō Brace Co., Ltd.). The company formerly occupied the same Social and Cultural Center as the Social Democratic Party National Union; after the center’s demolition in 2013 the party headquarters moved to rented floors in the Nagatachō Building (2-4-3 Nagatachō, Chiyoda), while Kōhō Brace relocated to 1-7-7 Shingashi, Itabashi, with its sales headquarters at 2-6-2 Hitotsubashi, Chiyoda. The party headquarters moved again in 2017 to the 5th and 6th floors of the Maruki Enomoto Building (3-18-17 Minato, Chūō). At the extraordinary national convention of November 2020 a resolution permitting merger into the Constitutional Democratic Party was narrowly passed and the party split. As a result the organ publications suffered a sharp drop in circulation; as of the end of March 2021 Shakai Shimpō stood at 50,000 copies.

== Successive directors of the Organ Paper Bureau and editors-in-chief ==
Directors of the Organ Paper Bureau (from the 1960s onward)

- Takeshi Tokano
- Isamu Akamatsu
- Orinoshin Tanaka
- Yūzō Awaya
- Eietsu Morinaga
- Masahiro Yamamoto
- Toshio Ōtsuka
- Masakatsu Takagi
- Hiromi Ichikawa
- Naoto Nakagawa
- Shōzō Yokota
- Osamu Nakajima

Editors-in-chief (from the 1960s onward)

- Shigeru Gotō
- Hiroji Nakahara
- Toshio Ōtsuka
- Hiroshi Nukui
- Genzō Sonoda
- Takeshi Ishida
- Minoru Masumura
- Seishirō Fukuda
- Hiroto Kikuchi
- Masaaki Soto
- Suguru Yajima
- Minoru Tanaka

== Contents (including past features) ==
- Rapid reports on the political situation and Social Democratic Party street-propaganda activities
- Serial manga “Dotō no Tōsan” (Satoru Takahashi)
- Seichō Matsumoto’s novel Chūō Ryūsha (serialized 1965–1966)
- “Karin no Chokugen” by Karin Amamiya
- Serial column “Reading Politics” by Tōru Hayano
- Serial column “Sataka Shin’s Viewpoint” by Shin Sataka

== Tokyo Shimpō ==
In 1971 the organ paper of the Japan Socialist Party Tokyo Metropolitan Headquarters, Tokyo Shimpō, was founded. In 1976 it became independent as the Tokyo Shimpō Company and has been published under that name ever since.
