= Mitsuya Station =

Railway station in Kanazawa, Ishikawa Prefecture, Japan

Mitsuya Station 三ツ屋駅
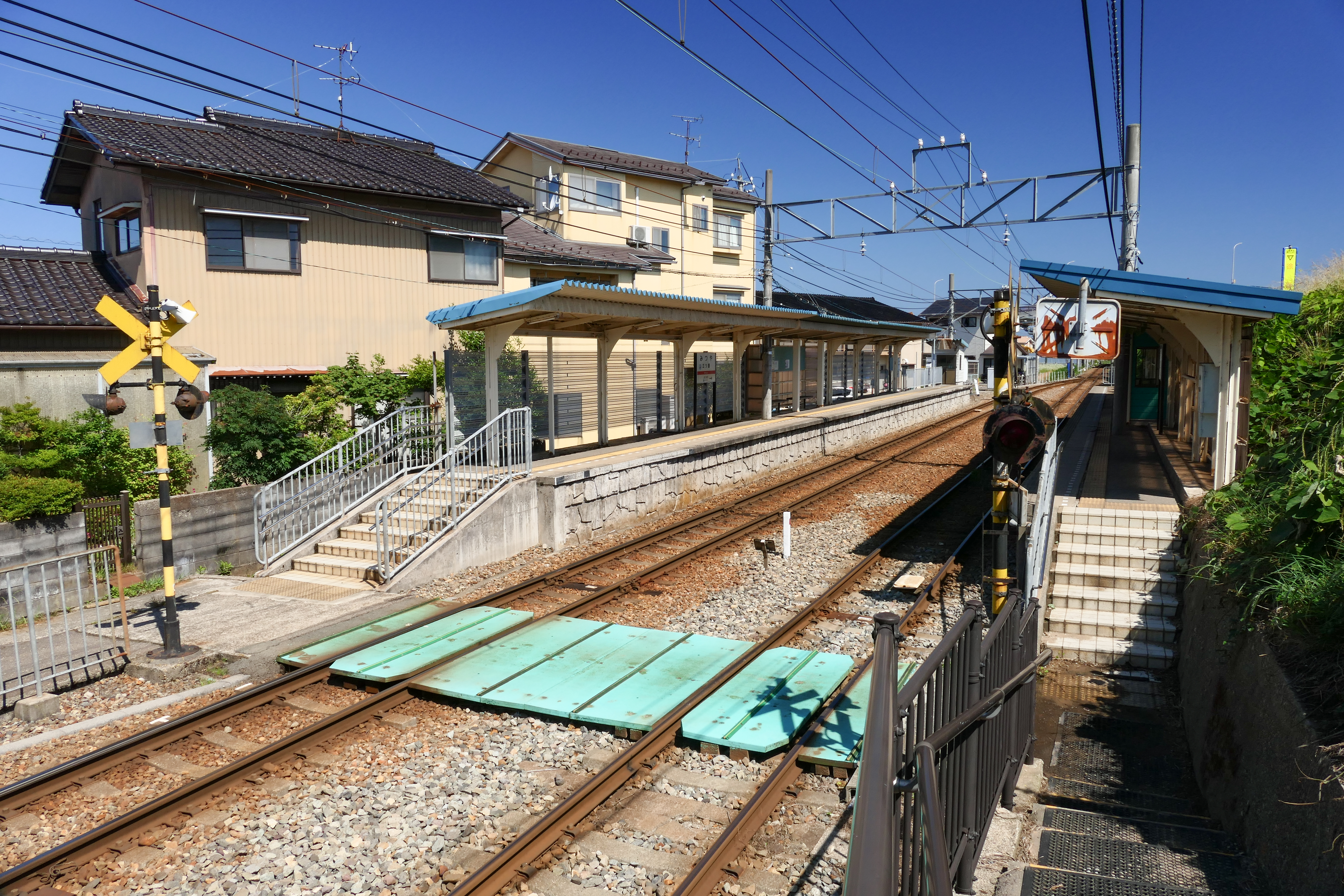
- Mitsuya Station in June 2023

General information
- Location: Mitsuyamachi, Kanazawa-shi, Ishikawa-ken 920-0214; Japan
- Coordinates: 36°36′43.03″N 136°38′44.16″E
- Operator: Hokuriku Railroad
- Line: ■ Asanogawa Line
- Distance: 3.9 km from Kanazawa
- Platforms: 2 side platform
- Tracks: 2

Other information
- Status: Unstaffed
- Website: Official website

History
- Opened: 10 May 1925

Passengers
- 2006: 808 daily

Services
Preceding station	Hokuriku Railroad	Following station
Mitsukuchi towards Hokutetsu-Kanazawa	Asanogawa Line	Okobata towards Uchinada
Location
- Location within Japan

Mitsuya Station (三ツ屋駅, Mitsuya-eki) is a railway station on the Hokuriku Railroad Asanogawa Line in Kanazawa, Japan, operated by the private railway operator Hokuriku Railroad (Hokutetsu).

== Lines ==
Mitsuya Station is served by the 3.9 km Hokuriku Railroad Asanogawa Line between Kanazawa and Uchinada, and is located between Mitsukuchi and Okobata stations.

== Station layout ==
The station consists of two opposed side platforms connected by a level crossing. There is no station building, but only weather shelters on each platform. The station is unattended.

== History ==
Mitsuya Station opened on 10 May 1925.

== Surrounding area ==
- National Route 8
- Asano River
- Minato Junior High School

== See also ==
- List of railway stations in Japan
