= Kitama Station =

Railway station in Kanazawa, Ishikawa Prefecture, Japan

Kitama Station 北間駅
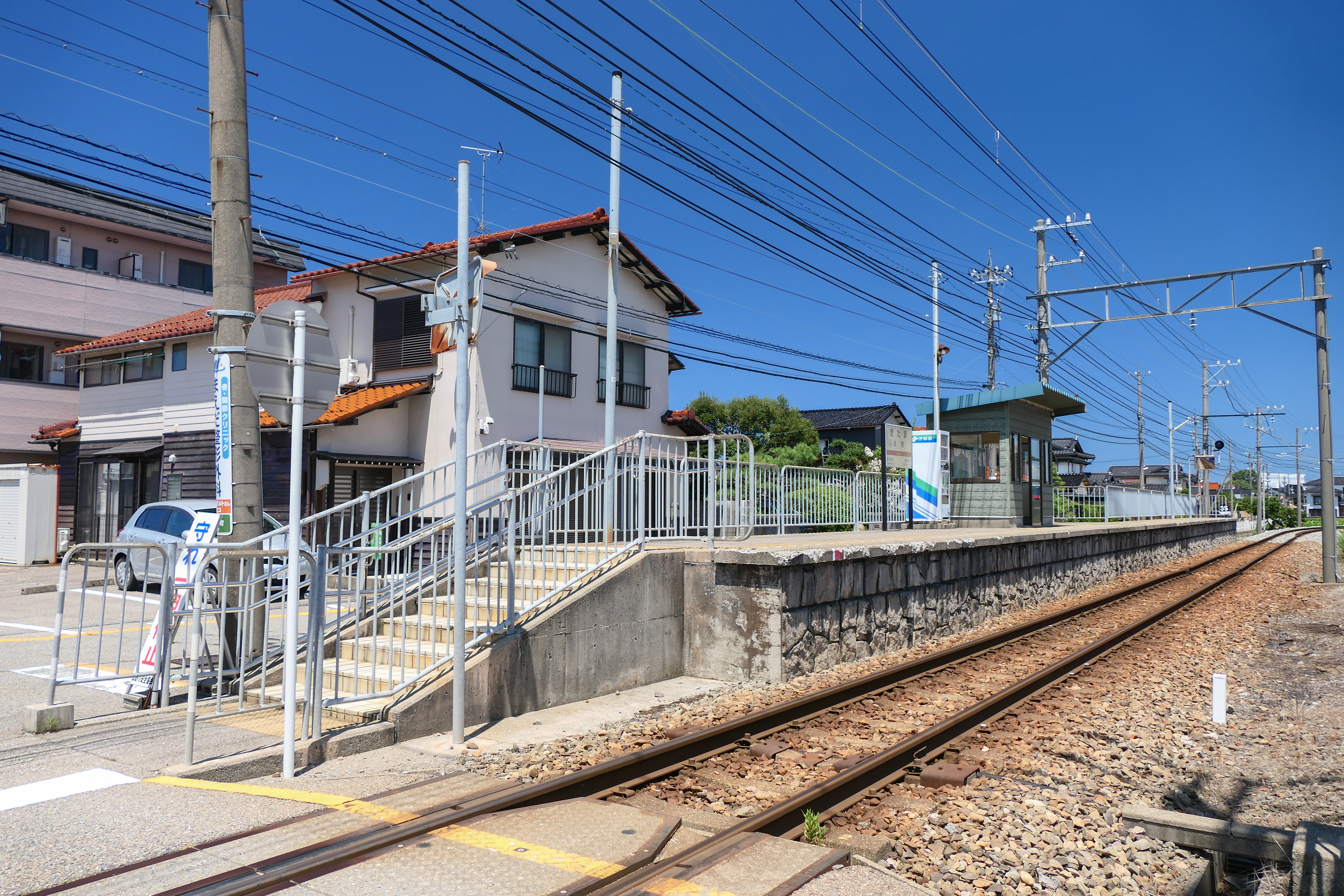
- Kitama Station in July 2022

General information
- Location: Suzakimachi, Kanazawa-shi, Ishikawa-ken 920-0207; Japan
- Coordinates: 36°37′21.2″N 136°38′28.34″E
- Operator: Hokuriku Railroad
- Line: ■ Asanogawa Line
- Distance: 5.1 km from Kanazawa
- Platforms: 1 side platform
- Tracks: 1

Other information
- Status: Unstaffed
- Website: Official website

History
- Opened: 10 May 1925

Passengers
- 2006: 35 daily

Services
Preceding station	Hokuriku Railroad	Following station
Okobata towards Hokutetsu-Kanazawa	Asanogawa Line	Kagatsume towards Uchinada
Location
- Location within Japan

Kitama Station (北間駅, Kitama-eki) is a railway station on the Hokuriku Railroad Asanogawa Line in the city of Kanazawa, Ishikawa Prefecture, Japan, operated by the private railway operator Hokuriku Railroad (Hokutetsu).

== Lines ==
Kitama Station is served by the 6.7 km Hokuriku Railroad Asanogawa Line between Kanazawa and Uchinada, and is located 5.1 kilometers from Kanazawa Station.

== Station layout ==
The station consists of one side platform serving one bi-directional track. The station is unattended.

== History ==
Kitama Station opened on 10 May 1925.

== Surrounding area ==
- Asano River
- Asanogawa Elementary School

== See also ==
- List of railway stations in Japan
