= Kagatsume Station =

Railway station in Kanazawa, Ishikawa Prefecture, Japan

Kagatsume Station 蚊爪駅
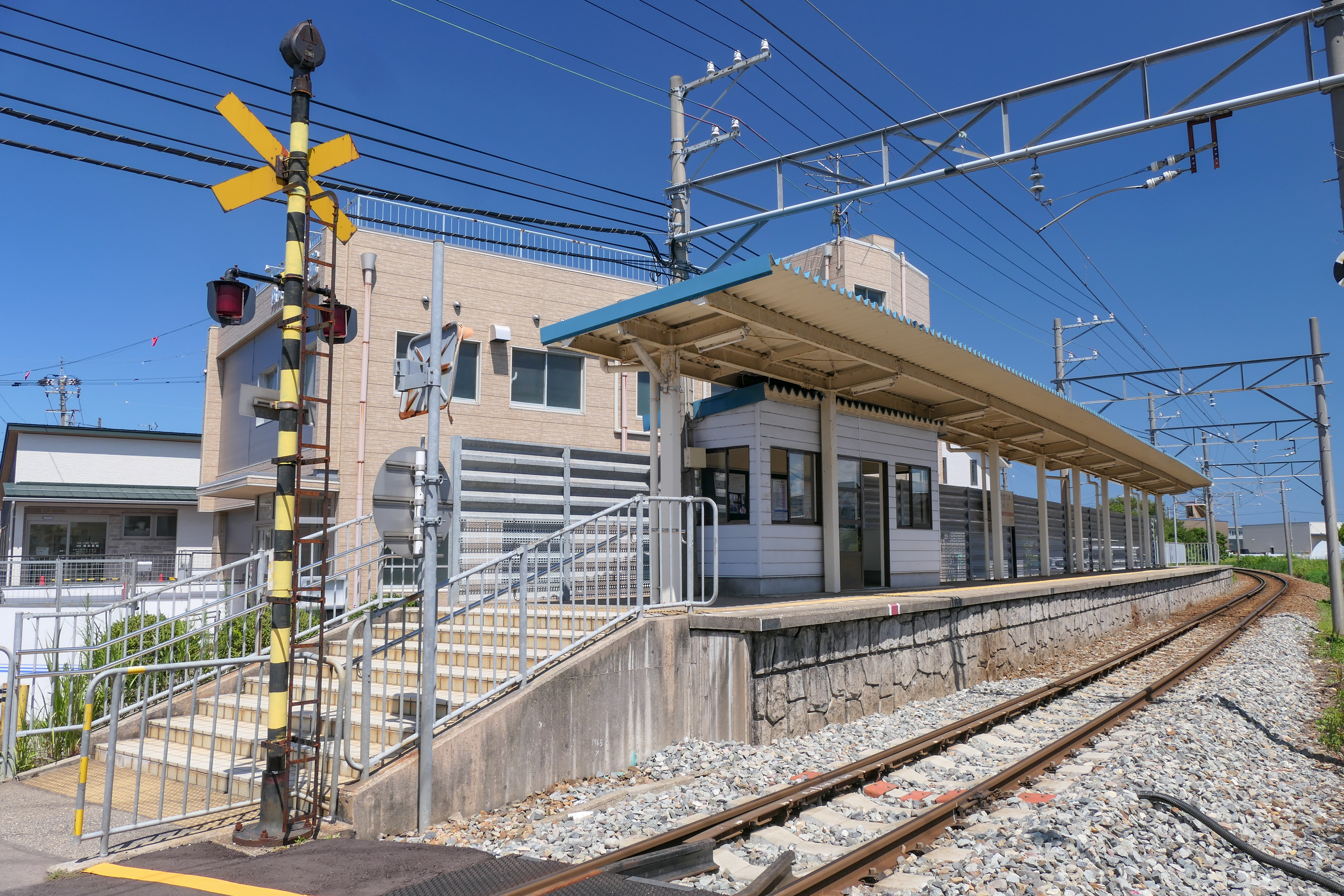
- Kagatsume Station in July 2022

General information
- Location: Kagatsumemachi, Kanazawa-shi, Ishikawa-ken 920-0208; Japan
- Coordinates: 36°37′32.73″N 136°38′35.4″E
- Operator: Hokuriku Railroad
- Line: ■ Asanogawa Line
- Distance: 5.5 km from Kanazawa
- Platforms: 1 side platform
- Tracks: 1

Other information
- Status: Staffed
- Website: Official website

History
- Opened: 10 May 1925

Passengers
- 2006: 313 daily

Services
Preceding station	Hokuriku Railroad	Following station
Kitama towards Hokutetsu-Kanazawa	Asanogawa Line	Awagasaki towards Uchinada
Location
- Location within Japan

Kagatsume Station (蚊爪駅, Kagatsume-eki) is a railway station on the Hokuriku Railroad Asanogawa Line in the city Kanazawa, Ishikawa Prefecture, Japan, operated by the private railway operator Hokuriku Railroad (Hokutetsu).

== Lines ==
Kagatsume Station is served by the 6.7 km Hokuriku Railroad Asanogawa Line between Kanazawa and Uchinada, and is located 5.5 kilometers from Kanazawa Station.

== Station layout ==
The station consists of one side platform serving a single bi-directional track. The station is unattended.

== History ==
Kagatsume Station opened on 10 May 1925.

== Surrounding area ==
- Asano River

== See also ==
- List of railway stations in Japan
