= Mitsukuchi Station =

Railway station in Kanazawa, Ishikawa Prefecture, Japan

Mitsukuchi Station 三口駅
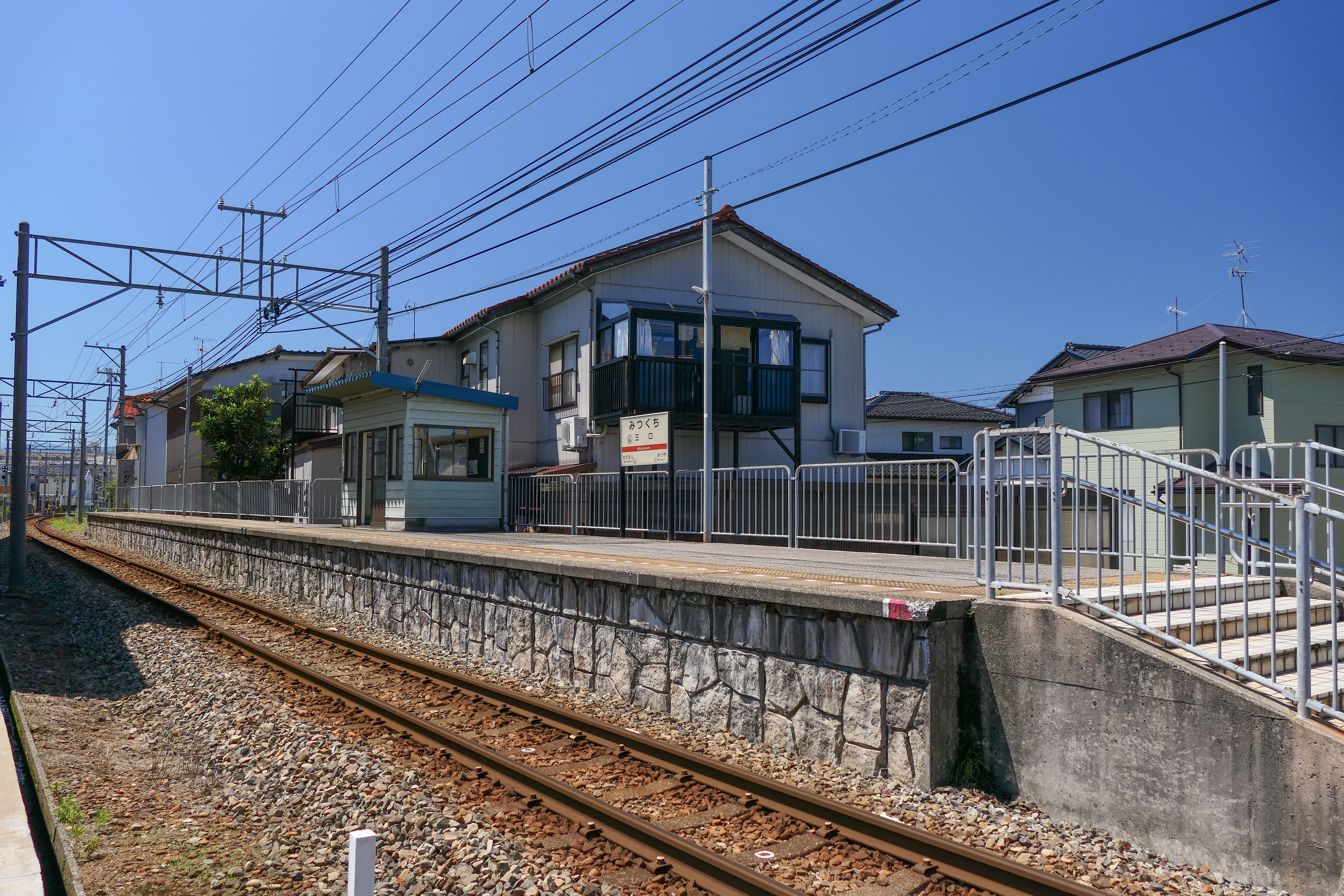
- Mitsukuchi Station in July 2022

General information
- Location: Mitsukuchimachi, Kanazawa-shi, Ishikawa-ken 920-0018; Japan
- Coordinates: 36°36′23.72″N 136°38′51.33″E
- Operator: Hokuriku Railroad
- Line: ■ Asanogawa Line
- Distance: 3.3 km from Kanazawa
- Platforms: 1 side platform
- Tracks: 1

Other information
- Status: Unstaffed
- Website: Official website

History
- Opened: 10 May 1925

Passengers
- 2006: 42 daily

Services
Preceding station	Hokuriku Railroad	Following station
Waridashi towards Hokutetsu-Kanazawa	Asanogawa Line	Mitsuya towards Uchinada
Location
- Location within Japan

Mitsukuchi Station (三口駅, Mitsukuchi-eki) is a railway station on the Hokuriku Railroad Asanogawa Line in the city of Kanazawa, Ishikawa Prefecture, Japan, operated by the private railway operator Hokuriku Railroad (Hokutetsu).

== Lines ==
Mitsukuchi Station is served by the 6.7 kilometres (4.2 mi) Hokuriku Railroad Asanogawa Line between Kanazawa and Uchinada, and is located 3.3 kilometres (2.1 mi) from Kanazawa Station.

== Station layout ==
The unattended station consists of one side platform serving a single bi-directional track.

== History ==
Mitsukuchi Station opened on 10 May 1925.

== Surrounding area ==
- Asano River

== See also ==
- List of railway stations in Japan
