= Okobata Station =

Railway station in Kanazawa, Ishikawa Prefecture, Japan

Okobata Station 大河端駅
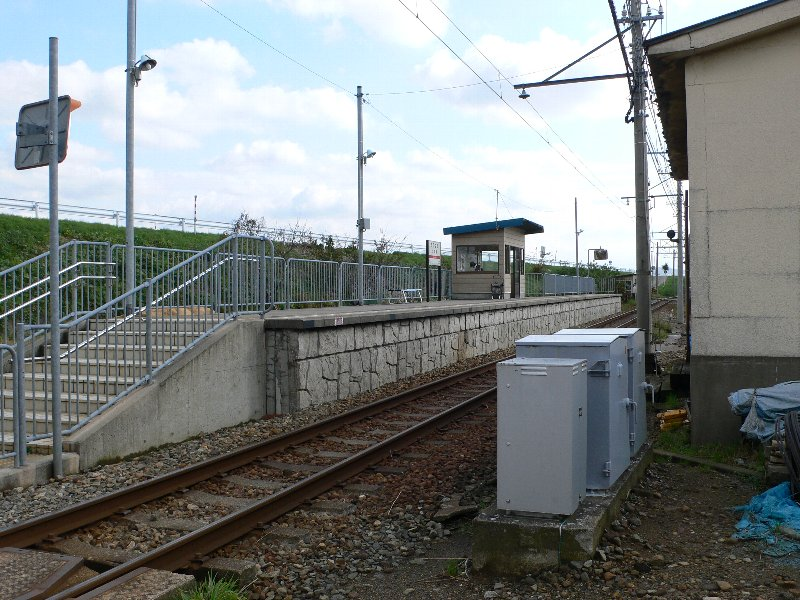
- Okobata Station in November 2005

General information
- Location: Okobatamachi, Kanazawa-shi, Ishikawa-ken 920-0213; Japan
- Coordinates: 36°37′0.51″N 136°38′36.1″E
- Operator: Hokuriku Railroad
- Line: ■ Asanogawa Line
- Distance: 4.5 km from Kanazawa
- Platforms: 1 side platform
- Tracks: 1

Other information
- Status: Unstaffed
- Website: Official website

History
- Opened: 10 May 1925

Passengers
- 2006: 43 daily

Services
Preceding station	Hokuriku Railroad	Following station
Mitsuya towards Hokutetsu-Kanazawa	Asanogawa Line	Kitama towards Uchinada
Location
- Location within Japan

Okobata Station (大河端駅, Okobata-eki) is a railway station on the Hokuriku Railroad Asanogawa Line in the city of Kanazawa, Ishikawa Prefecture, Japan, operated by the private railway operator Hokuriku Railroad (Hokutetsu).

== Lines ==
Okobata Station is served by the 6.7 km Hokuriku Railroad Asanogawa Line between Kanazawa and Uchinada, and is located 4.5 kilometers from Kanazawa Station.

== Station layout ==
The station consists of one side platform serving a single bi-directional track. The station is unattended.

== History ==
Okobata Station opened on 10 May 1925.

== Surrounding area ==
- Asano River

== See also ==
- List of railway stations in Japan
