= Awagasaki Station =

Railway station in Uchinada, Ishikawa Prefecture, Japan

Awagasaki Station 粟ヶ崎駅
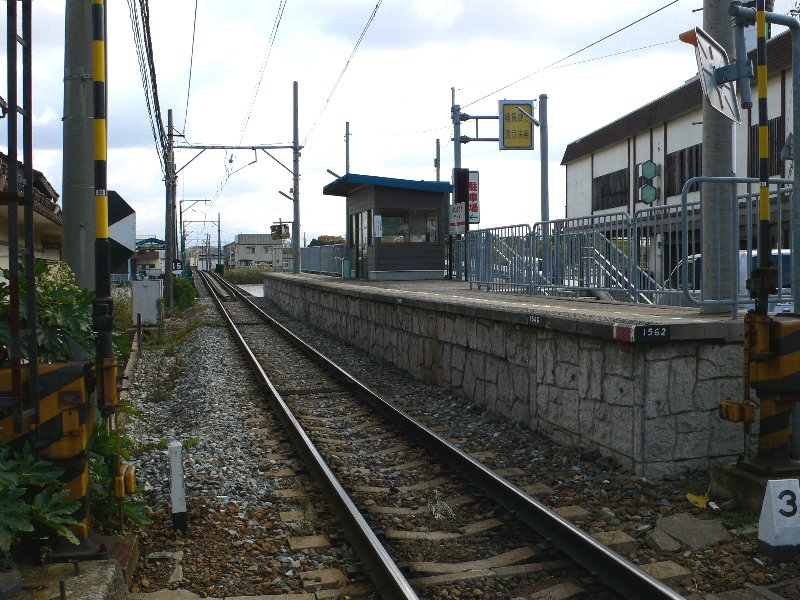
- Awagasaki Station in November 2005

General information
- Location: Mukaiawagasaki, Uchinada-machi, Kahoku-hun, Ishikawa-ken 920-0274; Japan
- Coordinates: 36°37′49.31″N 136°38′16.82″E
- Operator: Hokuriku Railroad
- Line: ■ Asanogawa Line
- Distance: 6.3 km from Kanazawa
- Platforms: 1 side platform
- Tracks: 1

Other information
- Status: Unstaffed
- Website: Official website

History
- Opened: 14 July 1929

Passengers
- 2006: 42 daily

Services
Preceding station	Hokuriku Railroad	Following station
Kagatsume towards Hokutetsu-Kanazawa	Asanogawa Line	Uchinada Terminus
Location
- Location within Japan

Awagasaki Station (粟ヶ崎駅, Awagasaki-eki) is a railway station on the Hokuriku Railroad Asanogawa Line in the town of Uchinada, Japan, operated by the private railway operator Hokuriku Railroad (Hokutetsu).

== Lines ==
Awagasaki Station is served by the 6.7 km Hokuriku Railroad Asanogawa Line between Kanazawa and Uchinada, and is located 6.3 kilometers from Kanazawa Station.

== Station layout ==
The station consists of one side platform serving a single bi-directional track.

== History ==
Awagasaki Station opened on 14 July 1929.

== Surrounding area ==
- Asahigaoka Community Center
- Sugahara Shrine

== See also ==
- List of railway stations in Japan
