= Nanatsuya Station =

Railway station in Kanazawa, Ishikawa Prefecture, Japan

Nanatsuya Station 七ツ屋駅
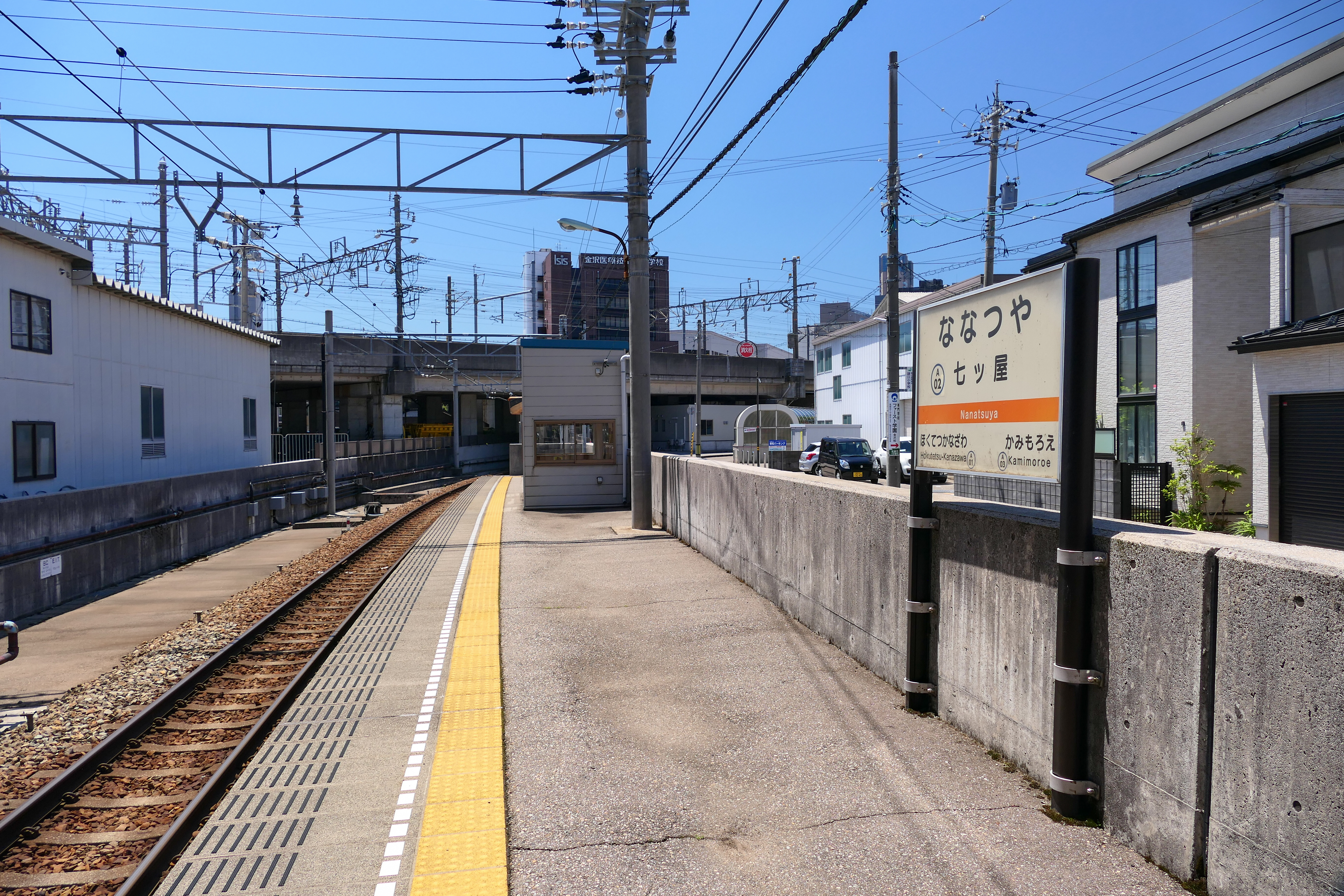
- Nanatsuya Station in June 2023

General information
- Location: Kitayasue, Kanazawa-shi, Ishikawa-ken 920-0022; Japan
- Coordinates: 36°34′59.19″N 136°39′6.31″E
- Operator: Hokuriku Railroad
- Line: ■ Asanogawa Line
- Distance: 0.6 km from Kanazawa
- Platforms: 1 side platform
- Tracks: 1

Other information
- Status: Unstaffed
- Website: Official website

History
- Opened: 10 May 1925

Passengers
- FY2006: 45 daily

Services
Preceding station	Hokuriku Railroad	Following station
Hokutetsu-Kanazawa Terminus	Asanogawa Line	Kamimoroe towards Uchinada
Location
- Location within Japan

Nanatsuya Station (七ツ屋駅, Nanatsuya-eki) is a railway station on the Hokuriku Railroad Asanogawa Line in the city of Kanazawa, Ishikawa Prefecture, Japan, operated by the private railway operator Hokuriku Railroad (Hokutetsu).

== Lines ==
Nanatsuya Station is served by the 6.8 km Hokuriku Railroad Asanogawa Line between Kanazawa and Uchinada, and is located 0.6 kilometers from Kanazawa Station.

== Station layout ==
The station consists of one side platform serving a single bi-directional track. The station is unattended.

== History ==
Nanatsuya Station opened on 10 May 1925.

== Surrounding area ==
- Hokuriku Railway Yasue Transformer Station

== See also ==
- List of railway stations in Japan
