= Waridashi Station =

Railway station in Kanazawa, Ishikawa Prefecture, Japan

Waridashi Station 割出駅
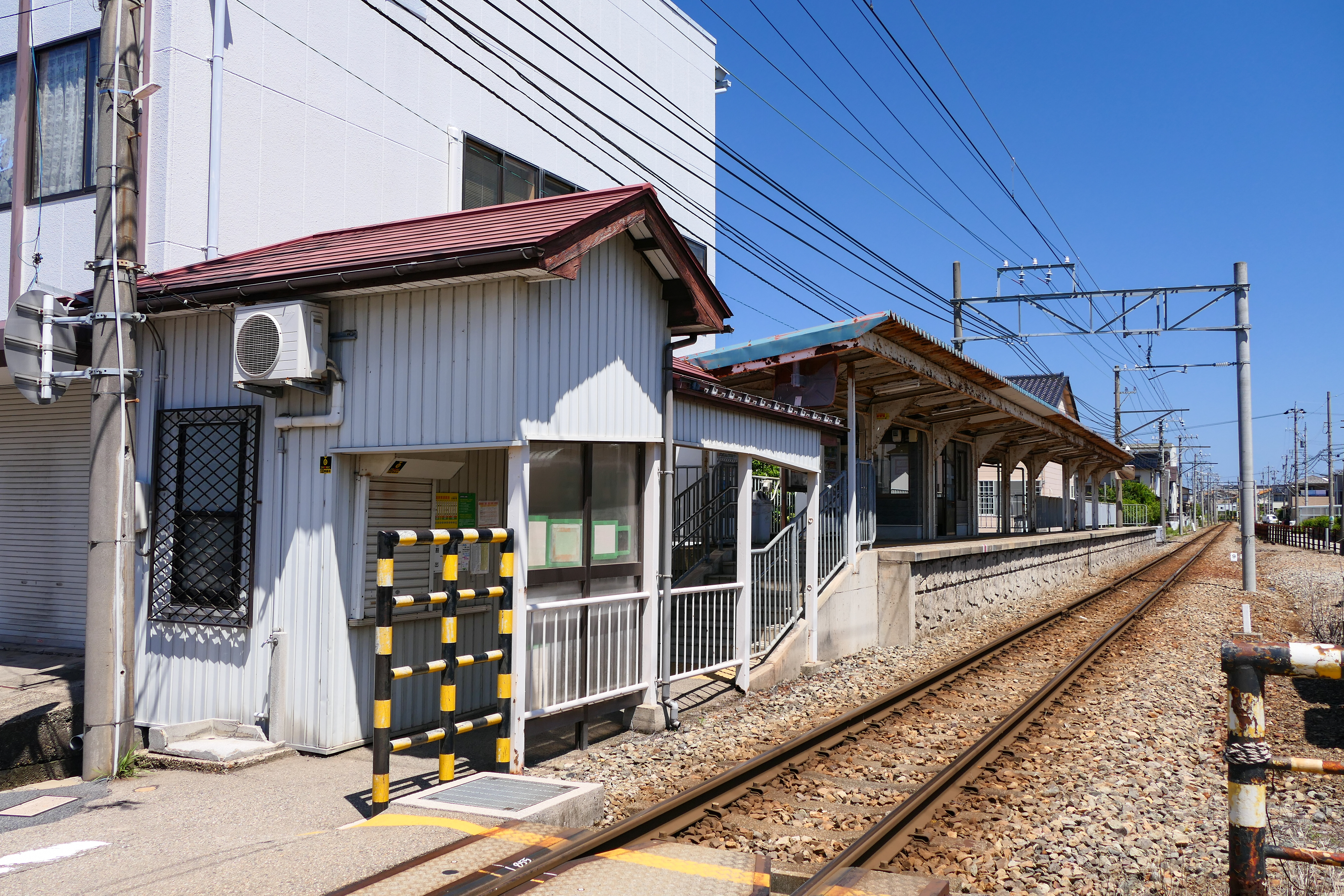
- Waridashi Station in June 2023

General information
- Location: Moroemachi, Kanazawa-shi, Ishikawa-ken 920-0014; Japan
- Coordinates: 36.3609°N 136.3854°E
- Operator: Hokuriku Railroad
- Line: ■ Asanogawa Line
- Distance: 2.8 km from Kanazawa
- Platforms: 1 side platform
- Tracks: 1

Other information
- Status: Unstaffed
- Website: Official website

History
- Opened: 10 May 1925

Passengers
- 2006: 357 daily

Services
Preceding station	Hokuriku Railroad	Following station
Isobe towards Hokutetsu-Kanazawa	Asanogawa Line	Mitsukuchi towards Uchinada
Location
- Location within Japan

Waridashi Station (割出駅, Waridashi-eki) is a railway station on the Hokuriku Railroad Asanogawa Line in the city of Kanazawa, Ishikawa Prefecture, Japan, operated by the private railway operator Hokuriku Railroad (Hokutetsu).

== Lines ==
Waridashi Station is served by the 6.7 km Hokuriku Railroad Asanogawa Line between Kanazawa and Uchinada, and is located 2.8 kilometers from Kanazawa Station.

== Station layout ==
The station consists of one side platform serving a single bi-directional track. The station is unattended.

== History ==
Waridashi Station opened on 10 May 1925.

== Surrounding area ==
- Hokuriku Railroad Headquarters
- Asanogawa Junior High School
- Matsudera Bridge
- Hokuriku Expressway
- National Route 8

== See also ==
- List of railway stations in Japan
