= ICa (card) =

Contactless smart card system in Kanazawa, Japan

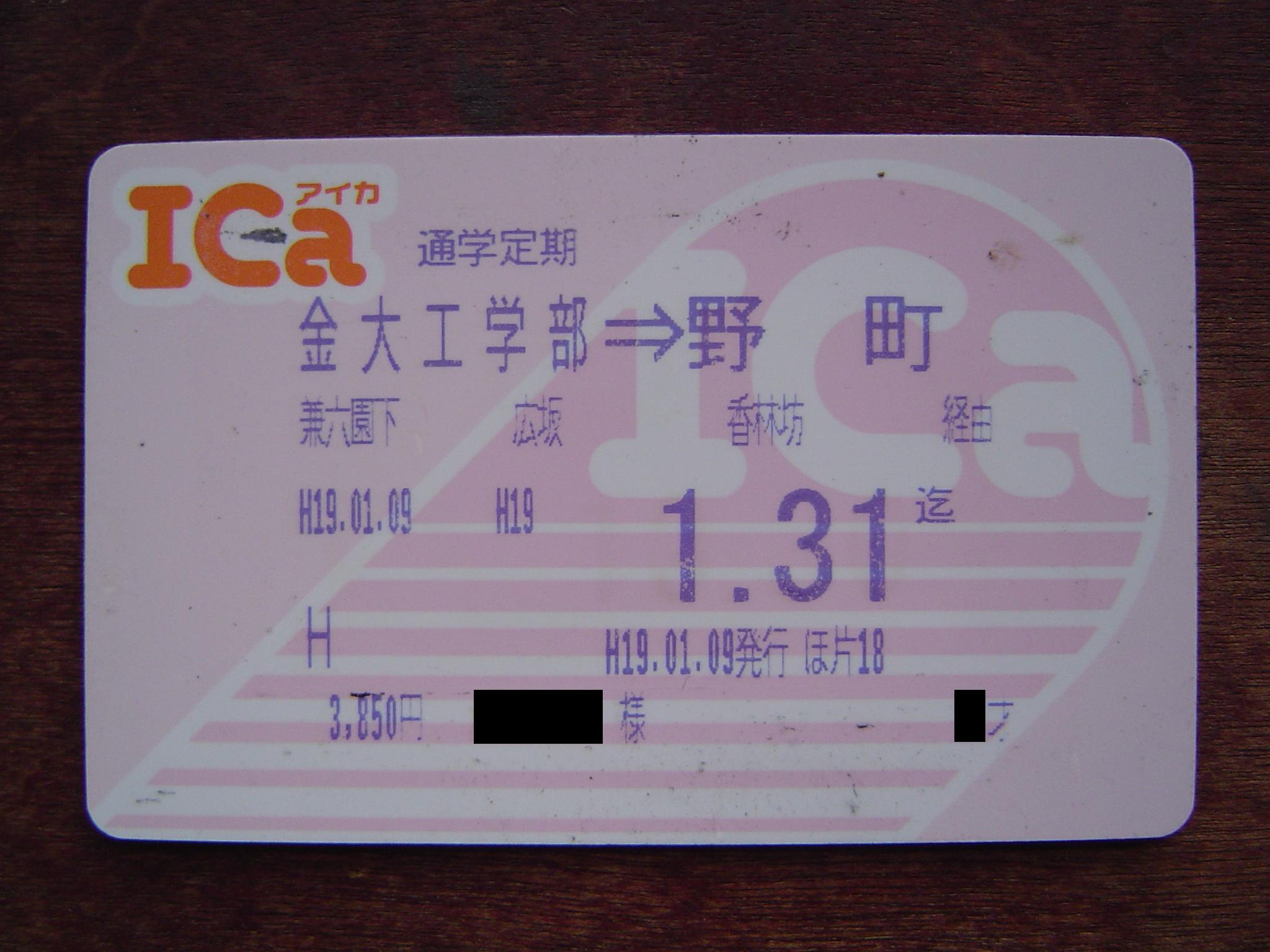
ICa card with commuter pass information printed on it

ICa (Japanese: アイカ, romanized: Aika) is a rechargeable contactless smart card ticketing system for public transport in Kanazawa, Japan, introduced by Hokuriku Railroad (Hokutetsu), from December 1, 2004. The name is the portmanteau of IC and card, as well as ai (love), hoping the card will be loved by users. Just like JR East's Suica or JR West's ICOCA, the card uses RFID technology developed by Sony corporation known as FeliCa. There is a mascot fairy character called ICa-chan (アイカちゃん, Aika-chan).

== Types of cards ==
- Normal cards
  - Prepaid card
  - Commuter pass
  - Junior card
  - Special discount card
- Memorial card

== Usable area ==
=== Bus lines ===
Both prepaid cards and commuter passes are accepted. Basically, only local bus lines in/around Kanazawa accept the card.

- Hokuriku Railroad
- Hokutetsu Bus
- Hokutetsu Kanazawa Chūō Bus
- Kaga Hakusan Bus
- Kanazawa Flat Bus

=== Railway lines ===
Only commuter passes are accepted.

- Asanogawa Line
- Ishikawa Line
