= KMU =

KMU may refer to:

- Kabinet Ministriv Ukrainy (Кабінет Міністрів України), the Cabinet of Ministers of Ukraine
- Kanazawa Medical University, a private university in Ishikawa, Japan
- Kansai Medical University, a private university in Osaka, Japan
- Kaohsiung Medical University, a private university in Kaohsiung, Taiwan
- Karl-Marx-Universität, former name of Leipzig University in Germany
- Kauno Medicinos Universiteto (Kaunas University of Medicine), now part of Lithuanian University of Health Sciences
- Keimyung University, a private university in South Korea
- Khyber Medical University, a public research university in Peshawar, Pakistan
- Kilusang Mayo Uno, a Philippines labor organization
- Kookmin University, a private university in South Korea
- Karamanoglu Mehmetbey University, a public university in Karaman, Turkey
- Kumbakonam railway station (Indian Railways station code), a railway station in Tamil Nadu, India
- Kadyos, manok, kag ubad, a Filipino chicken soup with pigeon peas and banana pith
