= Akira Iwai =

- 岩井 章

Secretary-General of the General Council of Trade Unions of Japan
- In office 1955–1970

Personal details
- Born: April 25, 1922 Matsumoto city, Nagano prefecture, Empire of Japan
- Died: February 18, 1997 (aged 74)
- Party: Japan Socialist Party

Akira Iwai (岩井 章, Iwai Akira; April 25, 1922 – February 18, 1997) was a Japanese trade union leader. He served as the secretary-general of the General Council of Trade Unions of Japan (Sōhyō) from 1955 to 1970.

Born in Matsumoto, Nagano, Iwai left school in 1937 and began working as a locomotive hand on the Japan National Railways. He served in the armed forces during World War II, but returned to the railways after the war, and joined the National Railway Workers' Union. In 1950, he became the chair of the union's headquarters struggle committee, leading the union's "year-end struggle" in 1952 and 1953, but in 1954 he was sacked by his employer due his trade union activities.

Within the national trade federation Sōhyō, Iwai voiced his disagreement with secretary-general Minoru Takano over Takano's "Peace Force Thesis," whereby Takano sought to align Sōhyō with the "peaceful" Soviet Union and Communist China against the "warlike" United States. In 1955, Iwai was instrumental in blocking the reelection of Takano to a fifth term, and was himself elected secretary-general instead. When the charismatic Kaoru Ōta was elected Sōhyō chairman in 1958, Ōta and Iwai formed a close partnership known as the "Ōta-Iwai Line," which sought to balance wage struggles with political struggles. Iwai supported Ōta's policy of the "spring wage offensive" (shuntō), an annual, coordinated, pre-scheduled strike by Sōhyō unions to secure annual wage increases in line with Japan's economic growth. Iwai also helped oversee Sōhyō's militant role in the 1960 Anpo protests against the U.S.-Japan Security Treaty and the 1960 Mitsui Miike Coal Mine Strike.

However, both the Anpo and Miike struggles came to be viewed as defeats for the labor movement, as the Anpo protests failed to stop passage of a revised security treaty, and the Miike miners' union was broken when Mitsui corporation succeeded in hiving off a more pliable "second union" and reopening the mine. After these perceived failures, Iwai and Ōta sought to further moderate Sōhyō's renowned militancy, shying away from political protests and focusing more on bread-and-butter issues such as securing piecemeal workplace improvements and wage increases, negotiated amicably with employers in advance of the annual shuntō spring wage offensive.

Public-sector unions, however, did not benefit as much from these efforts, and saw their wages falling behind private-sector counterparts. These workers remained extremely militant, and pressured Sōhyō to take more forceful actions vis-a-vis their government employers. When Sōhyō's public-sector unions threatened to go on strike in 1964, in defiance of a law banning public-sector workers from striking, Ōta and Iwai met face-to-face with Prime Minister of Japan Ikeda Hayato, and successfully negotiated an annual increase in public sector wages that would match pay in the private sector, in exchange for a promise to further reduce labor militancy.

Iwai retired as secretary-general of Sōhyō in 1970, and was awarded the Lenin Peace Prize that same year. In 1972, he became vice-president of the Japan-Soviet Friendship Society.

Trade union offices
Preceded by Minoru Takano	Secretary-General of the General Council of Trade Unions of Japan; 1955–1970	Succeeded by Shogo Oki
