= Kaoru Ōta =

- 太田 薫
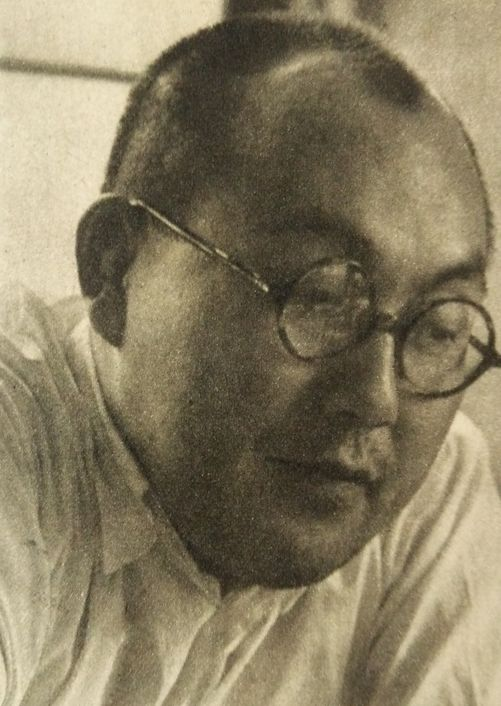
- Ōta in 1954

Chairman of the Japanese Federation of Synthetic Chemistry Workers' Unions
- In office 1953–1957

Chairman of the General Council of Trade Unions of Japan
- In office 1958–1966
- Preceded by: Yukitaka Haraguchi
- Succeeded by: Toshikatsu Horii

Personal details
- Born: January 1, 1912 Hayashida village, Okayama prefecture, Empire of Japan
- Died: September 14, 1998 (aged 86) Tokyo, Japan
- Party: Japan Socialist Party
- Education: Osaka Imperial University

Kaoru Ōta (Japanese: 太田 薫; 1 January 1912 – 14 September 1998) was a Japanese trade union leader. He served as chairman of the General Council of Trade Unions of Japan (Sōhyō) from 1958 to 1966. Known for his cheerful demeanor and energetic activism, Ōta's many forceful statements in defense of the Japanese workers were affectionately known as the "Ōta Trumpet" (Ōta rappa).

== Early life ==
Born in Hayashida village, Okayama prefecture (present-day Tsuyama city), Ōta graduated from the Department of Applied Chemistry of Osaka Imperial University. In 1938 he joined the Ube Nitrogen Company, where he rose to become chief of the Sulfuric Acid Section by the end of World War II.

== Early labor activism ==
In 1946, Ōta was elected president of the company labor union. In 1950, Ōta helped establish the Japanese Federation of Synthetic Chemistry Workers' Unions (Gōka Rōren) as an affiliate of Sōhyō, and would remain chairman of its central committee until 1979. In 1953, Ōta was elected chairman of Gōka Rōren, serving in that capacity until 1957. Within Sōhyō, Ōta voiced his disagreement with secretary-general Minoru Takano over Takano's "Peace Force Thesis," whereby Takano sought to align Sōhyō with the "peaceful" Soviet Union and Communist China against the "warlike" United States. The following year, three of Sōhyō's largest unions bolted to form the more moderate, openly anti-communist Zenrō labor federation, precipitating the ouster of Takano. In 1955, Akira Iwai was elected Sōhyō secretary-general, and Ōta was elected as the vice chairman, with a mandate to pursue a more moderate policy line. In 1958, the Ōta was elected chairman with Iwai remaining in his post as secretary-general.

== Chairman of Sōhyō ==
As leader of Sōhyō, Ōta adhered to Takano’s vision of a wide-ranging political activism, but sought to steer clear of the increasingly unpopular Japan Communist Party and more directly address workers' immediate economic concerns. Ōta and Iwai established a policy line known as the "Ōta-Iwai Line," which sought to balance wage struggles with political struggles. To this end, Ōta promoted the idea annual, scheduled, nationwide strikes known as shuntō ("spring wage offensives"), which he had first proposed in 1954. The shuntō was a response to the structural weakness of the Japanese labor movement; rather than organizing by industry, Japanese labor unions were "enterprise unions" organized on a company-by-company basis. This made any particular union reluctant to strike for higher wages and better working conditions, for fear that rival companies would simply snap up market share during the stoppage. Ōta's innovation was to schedule a specific date in the spring when all Sōhyō unions everywhere would agree to go on strike all at once. Since the shuntō was scheduled in advance, labor and management had ample time to work out a deal, and over time the shuntō became more of a ceremonial affair where workers would briefly go on "strike" for a day before returning to work, having already secured wage increases in advance. By ameliorating labor strife and avoiding economic uncertainty, this system suited both workers and employers, and rapidly spread throughout Japan. By the 1960s, shuntō was regularly securing workers large annual wage increases, in line with or even exceeding Japan's high-speed economic growth.

Ōta presided over the Japanese labor movement at the height of its postwar power, demonstrating Sōhyō's organizational strength by carrying out some of the largest strikes in Japan's history in support of the 1960 Anpo protests against the U.S.-Japan Security Treaty. The largest of these, a nationwide strike organized by on June 15 of that year involved walkouts by more than 6.4 million workers. At the same time, Ōta was also overseeing Sōhyō's efforts on behalf of one of its member unions in the massive 1960 Mitsui Miike Coal Mine Strike, which ultimately grew to become the largest militant conflict between management and labor in Japan's modern history.

Unfortunately for Ōta and Sōhyō, both the Anpo and Miike struggles came to be viewed as defeats for the labor movement, as the Anpo protests failed to stop passage of a revised security treaty, and the Miike miners' union was broken when Mitsui corporation succeeded in hiving off a more pliable "second union" and reopening the mine. After these perceived failures, Ōta sought to further moderate Sōhyō's renowned militancy, shying away from political protests and focusing more on bread-and-butter issues such as securing piecemeal workplace improvements and wage increases, negotiated amicably with employers in advance of the annual shuntō spring wage offensive.

Public-sector unions, however, did not benefit as much from these efforts, and saw their wages falling behind private-sector counterparts. These workers remained extremely militant, and pressured Ōta to take more forceful actions vis-a-vis their government employers. When Sōhyō's public-sector unions threatened to go on strike in 1964, in defiance of a law banning public-sector workers from striking, Ōta met with Prime Minister of Japan Ikeda Hayato, and successfully negotiated an annual increase in public sector wages that would match pay in the private sector, in exchange for a promise to further reduce labor militancy. That same year, Ōta was awarded the Lenin Peace Prize.

== Global policy ==
He was one of the signatories of the agreement to convene a convention for drafting a world constitution. As a result, for the first time in human history, a World Constituent Assembly convened to draft and adopt the Constitution for the Federation of Earth.

== Later life ==
Ōta stepped down as Sōhyō chairman in 1966, but continued to work as an advisor to Sōhyō, and remained active in the labor movement. In 1979, he stepped down from his positions in Gōka Rōren to mount a bid for the governorship of Tokyo, but was defeated. In the early 1980s, he served on the Central Labor Relations Commission.

Trade union offices
Preceded by Yukitaka Haraguchi	Chairman of the General Council of Trade Unions of Japan; 1958–1966	Succeeded by Toshikatsu Horii
