= So Aono =

Japanese writer

- Born: July 27, 1943 (age 83); Tokyo, Japan
- Writing career
- Notable works: "Gusha no yoru" Haha yo (O Mother)
- Notable awards: 1979 Akutagawa Prize for "Gusha no yoru" 1991 Yomiuri Prize for Haha yo (O Mother)

So Aono (青野 聰, Aono Sō; July 27, 1943) is a Japanese novelist. He is the third son of literary critic Suekichi Aono.

Aono was born in Tokyo and studied literature at Waseda University but left the university early to travel. After visiting Europe and Northern Africa, he returned to Japan in 1971, publishing his first work in the Waseda literary magazine. From 1972 to 1977 he travelled through Europe again.

Upon his return to Japan, Aono became active in literary and critical writings. He currently lives in Tokyo and is a Professor of Literature at Tama Art University.

Aono has translated works by Charles Bukowski into Japanese.

== Awards ==
- 1979 - Akutagawa Prize for "Gusha no yoru" (Night of the Fools).
- 1998 - Minister of Education Award for "Art for Ningen no itonami" (Human Conduct).
- 1991 - Yomiuri Literary Prize for Haha yo (O Mother).
