= Hokuriku Railroad Asanogawa Line =

Railway line in Japan

Asanogawa Line
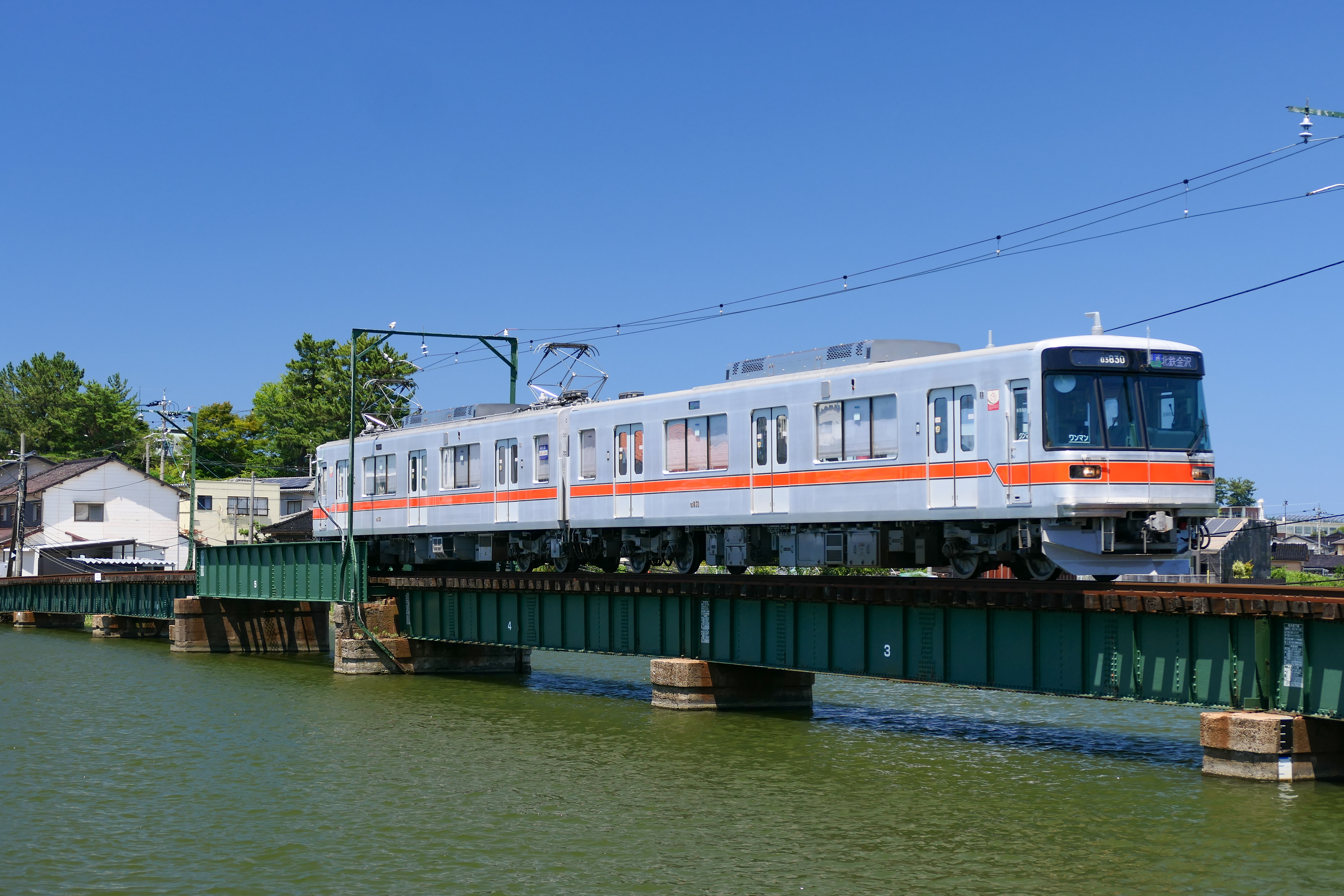
- Hokuriku Railway 03 series train, in July 2022

Overview
- Owner: Hokuriku Railway
- Locale: Ishikawa Prefecture
- Termini: Hokutetsu-Kanazawa; Uchinada
- Stations: 12
- Website: http://www.hokutetsu.co.jp/en

Service
- Type: Heavy rail

History
- Opened: 1925

Technical
- Line length: 6.8 km (4.23 mi)
- Track gauge: 3 ft 6 in (1,067 mm)
- Electrification: 1500 V DC

The Asanogawa Line (浅野川線, Asanogawa-sen) is a Japanese railway line which connects Kanazawa Station in Kanazawa, Ishikawa Prefecture with Uchinada Station in Uchinada, Ishikawa Prefecture. It is owned and operated by Hokuriku Railroad. Due to its history as the former Asanogawa Electric Railway, the line is often referred to as the Asaden (浅電).

== Service ==
All trains make the run from Hokutetsu-Kanazawa to Uchinada once every 30 minutes during the day, and once every 22–24 minutes during peak periods. The trip takes 17 minutes.

Until December 2006, there was an express service which stopped at Kami-Moroe, Waridashi, Mitsuya, and Kagatsuma; the trip took 14 minutes.

== History ==
- May 10, 1925: Asanogawa Electric Railway opens Nanatsuya — Shin-Susaki section, electrified at 600 VDC
- May 18, 1926: Kanazawa-Ekimae (now Hokutetsu-Kanazawa) — Nanatsuya section opens
- July 14, 1929: Shin-Sumachi — Awagasaki-Yūen-Mae (now Uchinada) — Awagasaki-Kaigan section opens
- February 11, 1945: Awagasaki-Yūen-Mae — Awagasaki-Kaigan section closes
- October 1, 1945: Hokuriku Railway absorbs Asanogawa Electric Railway; line becomes Asanogawa Line
- April 21, 1946: Mitsuya Station renamed Tsuribashi Station
- 1952: Awagasaki-Yūen-Mae — Awagasaki-Kaigan section reopens
- July 5, 1956: Hokutetsu-Kanazawa Station moved due to expansion of Kanazawa Station plaza
- May 14, 1960: Awagasaki-Yūen-Mae Station moves 0.1 km, renamed to Uchinada Station
- June 30, 1961: Shin-Susaki Station closes
- April 1, 1972: Freight operations end
- July 8, 1974: Uchinada — Awagasaki-Kaigan section closes
- November 26, 1974: Tsuribashi Station renamed Mitsuya Station
- December 19, 1996: Catenary voltage increased from 600 V to 1500 V DC; Driver-only operation begins
- March 28, 2001: Hokutetsu-Kanazawa — Nanatsuya section moved underground; ATS system begins operation
- December 1, 2006: Express service abolished

=== Former connecting lines ===
- Kanazawa Station: The 5 km 762 mm gauge Jinshi horse-drawn tramway opened in 1898, being converted to 1,067 mm gauge and electrified at 600 V DC in 1914. In 1920, the line was extended to Ono Port, and a further 2 km to Ono Minato in 1923. A 400m branch to Ryokuchi Park opened in 1930, passenger services on the branch ceasing in 1945 though the line remained to service a paper mill. The entire system closed in 1970.

== Rolling stock ==
Hokuriku Railway uses ten 8000 series (formerly Keio 3000 series) railcars on the Asanogawa Line. They are typically run in paired sets.

Former Tokyo Metro 03 series trains entered service on the line on December 21, 2020.

== Stations ==
All stations are located in Ishikawa Prefecture.

No	Station	Japanese	Distance (km)		Transfers	Location
No	Station	Japanese	Between Stations	Total	Transfers	Location
A01	Hokutetsu-Kanazawa	北鉄金沢駅	-	0.0	JR West and IR Ishikawa Railway (Kanazawa Station): Hokuriku Shinkansen, Nanao Line, IR Ishikawa Railway Line	Kanazawa
A02	Nanatsuya	七ツ屋駅	0.6	0.6		Kanazawa
A03	Kami-Moroe	上諸江駅	0.9	1.5		Kanazawa
A04	Isobe	磯部駅	0.7	2.2		Kanazawa
A05	Waridashi	割出駅	0.6	2.8		Kanazawa
A06	Mitsukuchi	三口駅	0.5	3.3		Kanazawa
A07	Mitsuya	三ツ屋駅	0.6	3.9		Kanazawa
A08	Okobata	大河端駅	0.6	4.5		Kanazawa
A09	Kitama	北間駅	0.6	5.1		Kanazawa
A10	Kagatsume	蚊爪駅	0.4	5.5		Kanazawa
A11	Awagasaki	粟ヶ崎駅	0.8	6.3		Uchinada, Kahoku District
A12	Uchinada	内灘駅	0.5	6.8		Uchinada, Kahoku District

== See also ==
- List of railway lines in Japan
