= Ikutarō Shimizu =

Japanese critic (1907-1988)

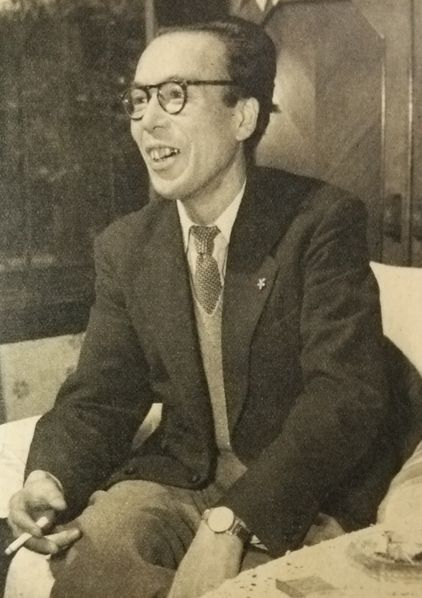
- Shimizu in 1954
- Born: July 9, 1907; Tokyo
- Died: August 10, 1988 (aged 81)
- Education: Tokyo Imperial University
- Occupation: sociologist

Ikutarō Shimizu (清水 幾太郎, Shimizu Ikutarō; 9 July 1907 – 10 August 1988) was a Japanese sociologist, cultural critic, and prominent public intellectual. He taught sociology for many years at Gakushūin University.

== Early life ==
Shimizu was born in the Nihonbashi district of Tokyo in 1907, the son of a bamboo dealer. After graduating with a degree in sociology from Tokyo Imperial University in 1931, he became a research assistant in the Department of Sociology at the same university. During Japan's war years, he worked for the government think tank Shōwa Kenkyūkai, wrote editorials for the Yomiuri Shimbun, and, in the final years of the war, worked for the Navy Technical Research Institute. An ardent nationalist throughout the war, Shimizu reportedly broke down in tears when he heard of Japan's surrender. In 1949, he was appointed professor of sociology at Gakushūin University, where he taught until taking early retirement amid the 1969 student riots. Shimizu's 1948 textbook Lectures on Sociology is considered a classic in the field and was the first comprehensive Japanese textbook on sociology produced in the postwar period.

== Postwar political activism ==
In the early postwar period, Shimizu actively participated in the "subjectivity debates." During the 1950s, he became extremely active in the movement against the US-Japan alliance and US military bases in Japan. Alongside other progressive intellectuals such as Masao Maruyama, Shimizu was a prominent member of the "Peace Problems Discussion Group (Heiwa Mondai Danwakai)," which played a crucial role in providing theoretical underpinnings for the Japanese pacifist and neutralist movements. Shimizu was also seen as the guiding light of the first major anti-base protest movement in Japan following the end of the US military occupation, at Uchinada village in Ishikawa prefecture, against the establishment of a US military artillery range.

Shimizu was also a leading figure during the massive 1960 Anpo protests against the US-Japan Security Treaty. When police instituted an unofficial ban against protests around the National Diet building, Shimizu devised a workaround. In the May 1960 issue of the left-leaning journal Sekai, Shimizu published an article entitled "Now, More than Ever, to the Diet!" He proposed that instead of requesting police permission to conduct protest marches near the Diet, the anti-treaty movement should invoke an obscure clause in the postwar Japanese constitution promising an individual "right to petition" the government. Shimizu argued that as long as each person came to the Diet with an individual petition to the government, they would not have to seek a permit in advance from police. Shimizu's proposal was enacted and served as the theoretical justification for massive protests in front of the Diet in late May and June 1960.

Shimizu was deeply disappointed by the failure of the anti-treaty movement to stop the treaty's ratification in 1960. Afterward, he severed his ties with progressive activists and devoted his attention to academic matters. In 1980, he surprised his former compatriots by publishing an essay in the right-wing magazine Shokun! demanding that Japan eliminate the pacifist Article 9 from its constitution, develop nuclear weapons, and return to the emperor-centric nationalism of the prewar era. This was viewed by many as a dramatic about-face and even a betrayal. However, historian Nick Kapur argues that Shimizu's positions had a certain consistency in that they were all grounded in nationalism and a desire for Japan to be a strong, independent nation.
