= Shuntō =

Japanese term for wage bargaining between unions and employers

Shuntō (春闘) is a Japanese term, usually translated as "spring wage offensive." It refers to the annual wage negotiations between enterprise unions and the employers in Japan. Beginning in February or March each spring, thousands of unions conduct wage negotiations with employers simultaneously.

Shuntō was first carried out in 1954, at the suggestion of Kaoru Ōta, the newly-installed vice chairman of the General Council of Trade Unions of Japan (Sōhyō). Shuntō was a response to the structural weakness of the Japanese labor movement; rather than organizing by industry, Japanese labor unions were "enterprise unions" organized on a company-by-company basis. This made any particular union reluctant to strike for higher wages and better working conditions, for fear that rival companies would simply snap up market share during the stoppage. Ōta's innovation was to schedule a specific date in the spring when all Sōhyō unions everywhere would agree to go on strike all at once. Since the shuntō was scheduled in advance, labor and management had ample time to work out a deal. By ameliorating labor strife and avoiding economic uncertainty, this system suited both workers and employers, and rapidly spread throughout Japan, becoming an enduring feature of Japanese industrial relations. By the 1960s, shuntō was regularly securing workers large annual wage increases, in line with or even exceeding Japan's high-speed economic growth. The Trade Union Confederation (Sōhyō, later succeeded by RENGO) customarily set a specific target percentage increase, the "base-up," for the annual wage increases to aid with collective bargaining. Negotiations for enterprise unions tended to begin after the bigger unions had secured their own deals and so they could push for their own company to match the improvements, which led to economy-wide wage increases. According to economist Ryotaro Takahashi, "The ripple effect of wage determination through the spring offensive is considerable. The average increase in wages in the annual spring offensive also spreads to unorganised small- and medium-sized enterprises. Moreover, the wages of the employees in government and government-affiliated corporations are raised through the National Personnel Authority (NPA) recommendation system, which is also influenced by the results of the spring offensive. The wages of part-timers and micro-enterprises are affected by the increase in the minimum wages by region."

In recent years, Japan has suffered from a number of recessions and deflation, and union membership has been falling, causing the value of the shuntō and the automatic wage increases associated with it to come under threat. Major unions in the steel, electronics, and automotive industries have been forced to reduce their demands and, in some years, even accept no increase in wages from employers. Simply protecting existing pay structures and jobs has often become the primary concern. In this context, criticism has arisen that shuntō has become little more than a ritual or ceremonial performance of labor militancy, lacking in efficacy.
