= Uchinada =

Uchinada 内灘町
- Town
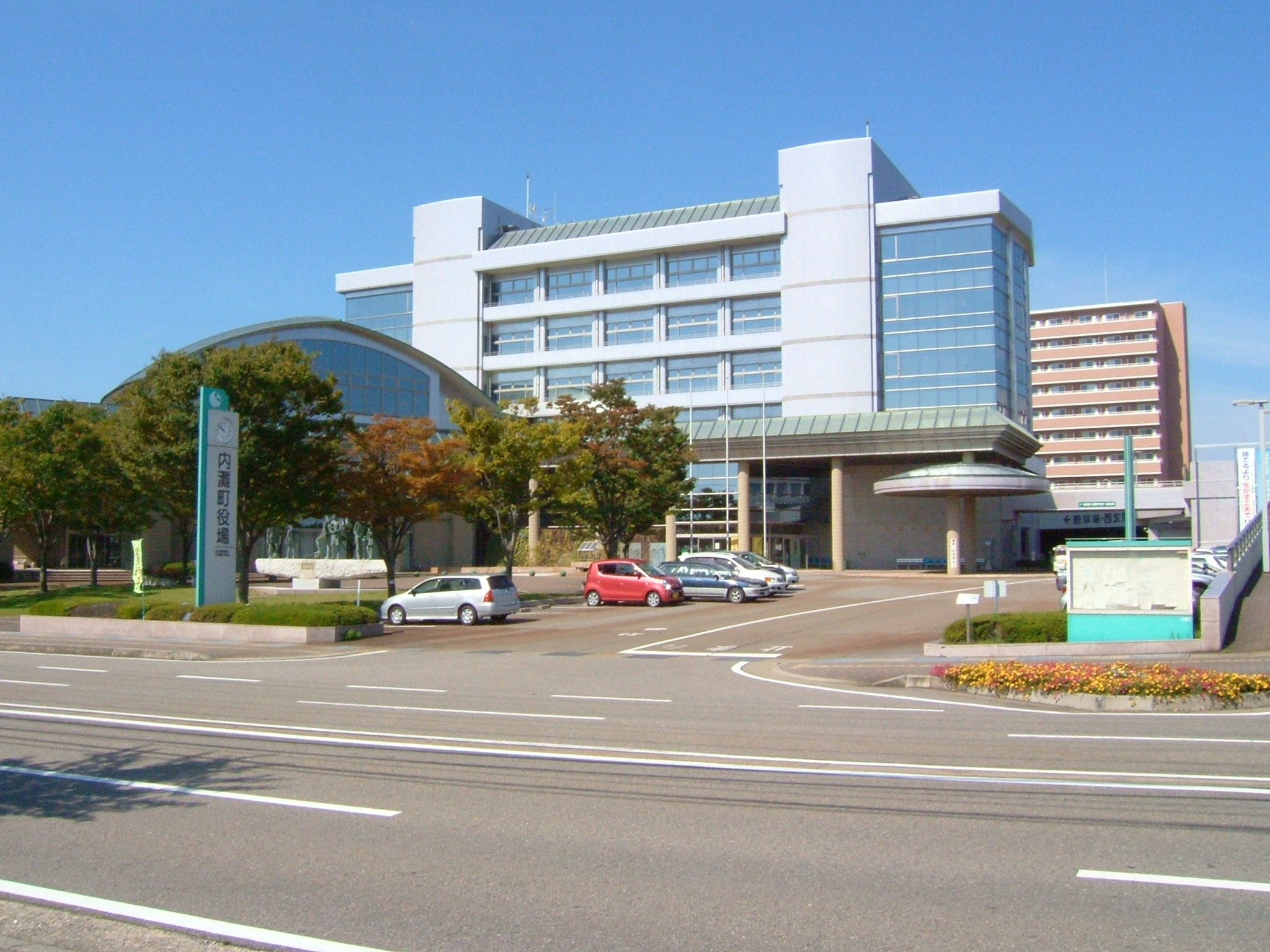
- Uchinada Town Hall

- Flag Seal

- Location of Uchinada in Ishikawa Prefecture

- Location within Japan
- Coordinates: 36°39′12.7″N 136°38′43.6″E
- Country: Japan
- Region: Chūbu; Hokuriku
- Prefecture: Ishikawa Prefecture
- District: Kahoku

Government
  - Mayor: Katsunori Kawaguchi

Area
  - Total: 20.33 km^{2} (7.85 sq mi)
- Elevation: 20 m (66 ft)

Population (February 28, 2018)
  - Total: 26,811
  - Density: 1,319/km^{2} (3,416/sq mi)
- Time zone: UTC+9 (Japan Standard Time)
- Town symbols
  - Tree: Japanese black pine
  - Flower: Japanese rose
  - Bird: Eastern marsh harrier
- Phone number: 076-286-1111
- Address: 1-2-1 Daigaku, Uchinada-machi, Kahoku-gun, Ishikawa-ken 920-0292 =
- Website: Official website

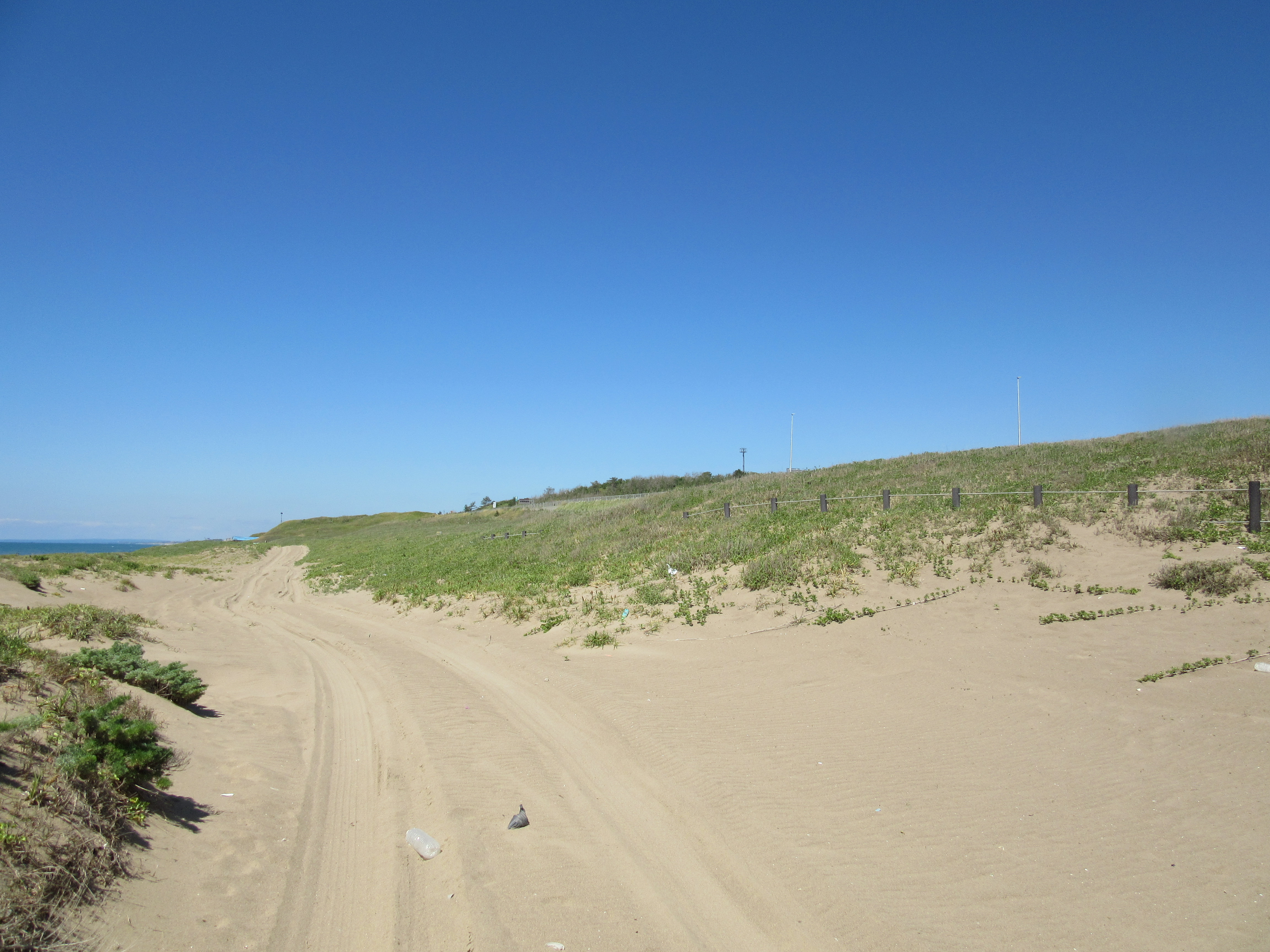
Uchinada Dunes

Uchinada (内灘町, Uchinada-machi) is a town located in Kahoku District, Ishikawa Prefecture, Japan. As of 28 February 2018, the town had an estimated population of 26,811 in 10783 households, and a population density of 1300 persons per km^{2}. The total area of the town was 20.33 square kilometres (7.85 sq mi).

== Geography ==
Uchinada is located near the middle of Ishikawa Prefecture, bordered by the Sea of Japan to the west, the city of Kanazawa to the south and the city of Kahoku to the north. Uchinada sits in a typical seaside sand-dune environment, lacking any major mountains or rivers, with an average elevation of 20 meters. The highest point of elevation reaches 58.51 meters, with a dynamic landscape formed by the constant forming and reforming of sand dunes, both new and old. It is a suburb of Kanazawa, the capital of Ishikawa Prefecture. The town has a humid subtropical climate (Köppen Cfa) characterized by mild summers and cold winters with heavy snowfall. The average annual temperature in Uchinada is 14.3 °C. The average annual rainfall is 2534 mm with September as the wettest month. The temperatures are highest on average in August, at around 26.9 °C, and lowest in January, at around 3.2 °C.

=== Neighbouring municipalities ===
- Ishikawa Prefecture
  - Kahoku
  - Kanazawa
  - Tsubata

== Demographics ==
Per Japanese census data, the population of Uchinada nearly doubled in the 1970s and has remained relatively stable in recent decades.

Historical population
Year	Pop.	±%
1970	10,890	—
1980	20,814	+91.1%
1990	24,688	+18.6%
2000	26,560	+7.6%
2010	26,927	+1.4%
2020	26,574	−1.3%

== History ==
Remains of earthenware pots found in the sand dunes of Uchinada reveal the existence of humans living in the area since the Jōmon period. The area around Uchinada was mostly part of ancient Kaga Province. The area became part of Kaga Domain under the Edo period Tokugawa shogunate. Following the Meiji restoration, the area was organised into Kahoku District, Ishikawa. The village of Uchinada was founded on April 1, 1889, with the establishment of the modern municipalities system. It was rated to town status on January 1, 1952.

Uchinada became the center of the first large-scale protest movement against one of the US military bases that remained in Japan even after the end of the US Military Occupation of Japan. The movement arose in protest against the construction of an artillery range to train United States Army units during the Korean War. Nationwide sympathy was aroused by the perceived danger to the natural ecosystem of the Uchinada sand dunes. Activists from around Japan joined the protests, and the "Uchinada Incident" helped launch a nationwide anti-base movement. Ultimately, the protest movement, which lasted from 1952 to 1953, failed to stop the opening of the range. The artillery range opened in March 1953, and was turned over to the Japanese government in 1957.

== Economy ==
Commercial fishing was formerly a mainstay of the local economy, followed by the industrial fiber industry, and agriculture. The town is increasingly a bedroom community for Kanazawa.

== Education ==
Uchinada has six public elementary schools and one public middle school operated by the town government as of April 2018. The town has one public high school operated by the Ishikawa Prefectural Board of Education. Kanazawa Medical University is also located in Uchinada.

== Transportation ==
=== Railway ===
Hokuriku Railroad - Ishikawa Line

- Awagasaki - Uchinada

=== Highway ===
- National Route 470

== Sister cities ==
- Haboro, Hokkaido, Japan
- Wujiang District, Suzhou, China

== Local attractions ==
- Uchinada Multipurpose Park

=== Events ===
- World Kite Festival: Uchinada is internationally known for its World Kite Festival which occurs annually on May 3 and 4. People from around Japan and the world gather on the shores of Uchinada's beaches every year to fly kites during this festival.
- Acacia Romantic Festival: This festival occurs every year in mid-May when the blossoms from the false acacia trees shielding the town from sand and wind are in full bloom. It consists of a flea market on the 2.1 km Forest Promenade in the morning and a series of performances by various associations in the town at the nearby Hamanasu Dinosaur Park starting at noon.
