= Suekichi Aono =

Japanese literary theorist and critic

- 青野 季吉
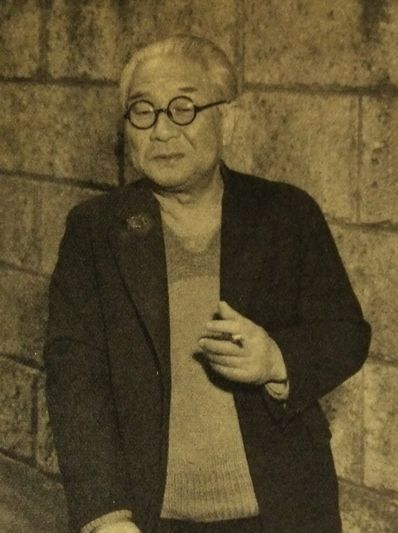
- Suekichi Aono in 1954
- Born: February 24, 1890; Sado Island, Niigata Prefecture, Empire of Japan
- Died: June 23, 1961 (aged 71); Tokyo, Japan
- Education: Waseda University
- Occupations: Literary critic, literary theorist
- Children: So Aono

Suekichi Aono (Japanese: 青野 季吉; 24 February 1890 – 23 June 1961) was a Japanese literary theorist and critic.

== Biography ==
Aono was born into an impoverished landlord family. In 1915, he graduated from the English Department of Waseda University and joined the Yomiuri Shimbun in the same year, but later resigned because he opposed the editorial of the newspaper's head supporting intervention in Siberia.

In 1922, Aono joined the Japanese Communist Party and began to publish articles in Tane maku Hito in the same year, but later withdrew from the Japanese Communist Party. In 1926, he published the article "Natural Growth and Purpose Consciousness", which called on the proletariat to express themselves consciously and led to him becoming one of the main theorists of the proletarian literature movement in Japan during the 1920s. In 1927 he joined the Labor-Peasant Faction, a Japanese Marxist group made of Japanese Marxist intellectuals critical of the JCP. In 1938 he was arrested and imprisoned during the Popular Front Incident, but was released on bail the following year.

After World War II, he worked hard to rebuild the Japan PEN Club, serving as its vice-president from 1948. In 1949, he also served as a member of the newly established National Language Council.

In 1950, he won the first Yomiuri Literature Prize for Literary Criticism for "Modern Literature Theory". In 1951, he became president of the Japan Writers Association. In 1956, he became a member of the Japan Art Academy. In 1958, he won the Mainichi Publishing Culture Award for "Fifty Years of Literature."
