= Kanazawa Medical University =

Higher education institution in Ishikawa Prefecture, Japan

Coordinates: 36°39′20.2″N 136°38′45.8″E

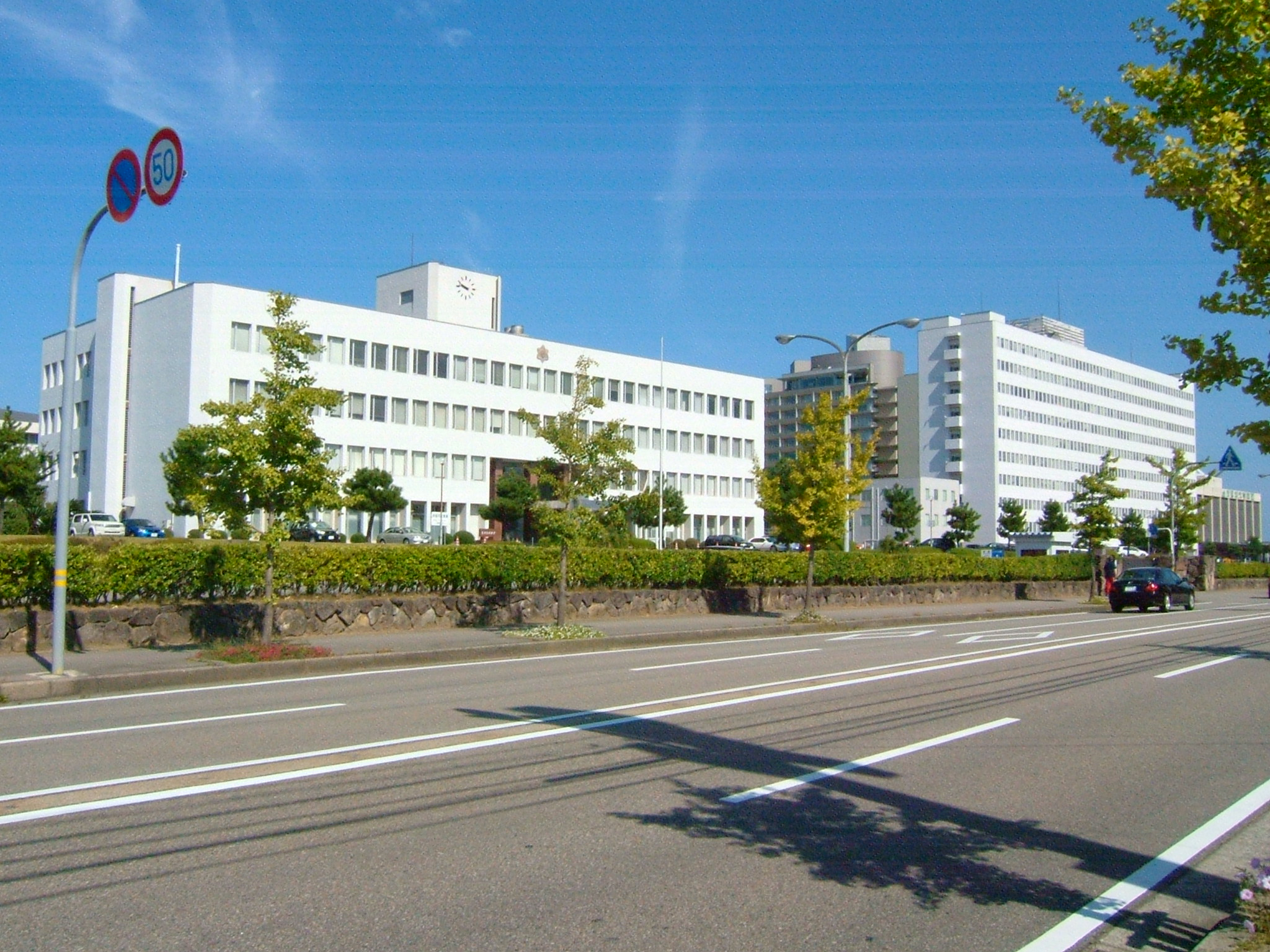
Kanazawa Medical University

Kanazawa Medical University (金沢医科大学, Kanazawa ika daigaku) is a private university in Uchinada, Ishikawa, Japan, established in 1972.

A general hospital Kanazawa Medical University Hospital is attached to the university. The university has operated Kanazawa Medical University Himi Municipal Hospital in Himi, Toyama since 2008.

== Development ==
- June 1, 1972 - Opening of university
- 1973 - Opening of affiliated nursing school
- 1974 - Opening of Kanazawa Medical University Hospital, and the founding of a graduate research department
- 1987 - Expansion of Kanazawa Medical School Hospital Annex
- 1989 - Founding of the Institute of Comprehensive Medicine
- 1994 - Begin offering special treatment services
- 1995 - Inspection and subsequent approval by the General Medical Council
- 1996 - Begin operation of KMUnet
- 1998 - Establishment of a high tech research center
- 2000 - Move to the use of electronic health records
- 2003 - Construction and opening of a new hospital building, reorganization of medical care, reorganization of the Graduate School of Medicine, construction of a student clubhouse, and registration as a full member of the Japan University Accreditation Association (JUAA) (jp:大学基準協会)
- 2004 - Restructuring of the medical school course system
- 2007 - The affiliated nursing vocational school is upgraded to a school of nursing offering 4 year degree programs
- 2008 - Began operation of Kanazawa Medical University Himi Municipal Hospital as designated administrator

== Controversies ==
- On December 8, 2018, a university official made a public statement that the School of Medicine had conducted its entrance examinations inappropriately.
  - Age was taken into consideration when deciding alternate candidates, and applicants meeting the following criteria were given additional points when taking the AO (Admissions Office) entrance examinees: high school graduates from any of the three Hokuriku prefectures (Ishikawa (5 points), Fukui (3 points), and Toyama (3 points)), children of alumni (10 points), 3rd year high school students and 1st year rōnin (浪人) (5 points). Additional points were also given during the application screening process for transfer applicants who taking the transfer exam who had graduated from a highschool in one of the three Hokuriku prefectures and students who were under the age of 25, whereas points were deducted from applicants aged 27 and above.
  - In response, the JUAA announced that it would be retracting its "Conforming" evaluation for the academic years of 2013-2017. Universities without this status are unable to apply for government grants for the development of educational programs.
