= Minoru Takano =

Japanese labor union leader (1901-1974)

- 高野 実
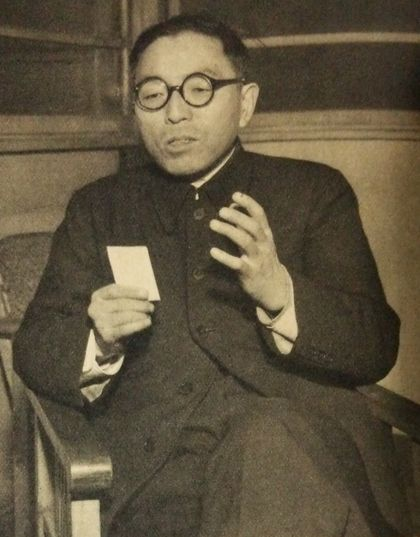
- Takano in 1954

Secretary-General of the General Council of Trade Unions of Japan
- In office 1951–1955
- Preceded by: position established
- Succeeded by: Akira Iwai

Personal details
- Born: January 27, 1901; Uchisaiwai district, Kōjimachi ward, Tokyo, Empire of Japan
- Died: September 13, 1974 (aged 73)
- Political party: Japan Communist Party
- Education: Waseda University (expelled)

Minoru Takano (高野実, Takano Minoru, January 27, 1901 – September 13, 1974) was a Japanese trade union leader. He served as the first secretary-general of the General Council of Trade Unions of Japan (Sōhyō) from 1951 to 1955. A charismatic figure, Takano succeeded in instilling a wide-ranging social activism into Sōhyō's organizational culture.

== Early life ==
Minoru Takano was born in the Uchisaiwai district of the former Kōjimachi ward of Tokyo on January 27, 1901. In 1921, he enrolled in the Department of Applied Chemistry at Waseda University, where he immediately became involved in socialist activism. In 1922, while still a college student, he helped co-found the Japan Communist Party (JCP). However, in 1924, he was arrested for his role in the "First JCP Incident" of 1923 and was subsequently expelled from Waseda. Thereafter, he became heavily involved in the labor movement.

== Early labor activism ==
By 1929, Takano had risen to become secretary-general of the Tokyo Publisher's Union. In 1934, he participated in founding the National Council of Japanese Trade Unions (Zenhyō), serving for nine years as its organizational director and head of publications. In these roles, he became heavily involved in labor organizing, which earned him the ire of the militarist regime and led him to be included among the left-wing activists arrested in the Popular Front Incident of 1937. Takano spent three years in prison, contracting a case of persistent tuberculosis that would shadow his health for the remainder of his life. By the time he was released in 1940, amidst the spiraling war in China, the militarist regime had dissolved all existing labor unions and absorbed them into the Industrial Association for Serving the Nation (Sampō), as part of a national reorganization of all civil organizations under central government control.

== Secretary-General of Sōhyō ==
After Japan's defeat in World War II and the collapse of the militarist regime, Takano returned to labor activism under the U.S. Occupation, which legalized labor unions and explicitly protected labor organizing in the new Japanese Constitution promulgated at the Occupation's behest in 1947. In 1950 Takano played a central role in the creation of the General Council of Trade Unions of Japan (better known by its Japanese abbreviation Sōhyō), and in 1951, he was elected its first secretary-general.

Sōhyō had been formed with the connivance of Occupation authorities, as what they hoped would be a moderate, centrist alternative to the militant, JCP-affiliated labor unions that had dominated the Japanese labor movement prior to the Red Purge of 1948–1950. However, Takano was no moderate, and he immediately set about instilling in the new organization his vision of wide-ranging social activism extending far beyond workplace issues to encompass a broad array of left-wing social and political causes, becoming the leading figure in Sōhyō's dramatic "left turn." With the JCP in disarray following the Red Purge and a disastrous flirtation with armed revolution, Takano led Sōhyō into the embrace of the Japan Socialist Party (JSP) instead.

As secretary-general, Takano played a leading role in organizing protests by Sōhyō-affiliated labor unionists against the Anti-Subversive Activities Law of 1952, and against the U.S. artillery range in the Uchinada sand dunes from 1952 to 1953, as well as against the U.S. nuclear testing in the wake of the Lucky Dragon nuclear fallout incident of 1954. He also presided over a series of increasingly militant workplace struggles and strikes, thereby instilling both political and labor militancy in Sōhyō's organizational DNA.

However, in 1953, Takano crossed a bridge too far when he introduced his "Peace Force Thesis," whereby Takano sought to align Sōhyō with the "peaceful" Soviet Union and Communist China against the "warlike" United States. This stance provoked a chorus of criticism from within both Sōhyō and the JSP. The following year, three of Sōhyō's largest unions bolted to form the more moderate, openly anti-communist Zenrō labor federation, precipitating the ouster of Takano. In 1955, Akira Iwai was elected Sōhyō's new secretary-general, with a mandate to pursue a more moderate policy line.

== Later life ==
Thereafter, Takano rejoined the Japan Communist Party, but would eventually be expelled in 1968. In 1956, he became vice chairman of the National Metal Workers' Union (Zenkin), serving until 1970. During this period, Takano made several trips to the People's Republic of China, building up relations between the Japanese labor movement and the Chinese Communist Party.

Takano died at the age of 73, on September 13, 1974, of the tuberculosis he had contracted in prison in the late 1930s.

Trade union offices
Preceded by position established	Secretary-General of the General Council of Trade Unions of Japan; 1951–1955	Succeeded by Akira Iwai
