= Uchinada Station =

Railway station in Uchinada, Ishikawa Prefecture, Japan

Uchinada Station 内灘駅
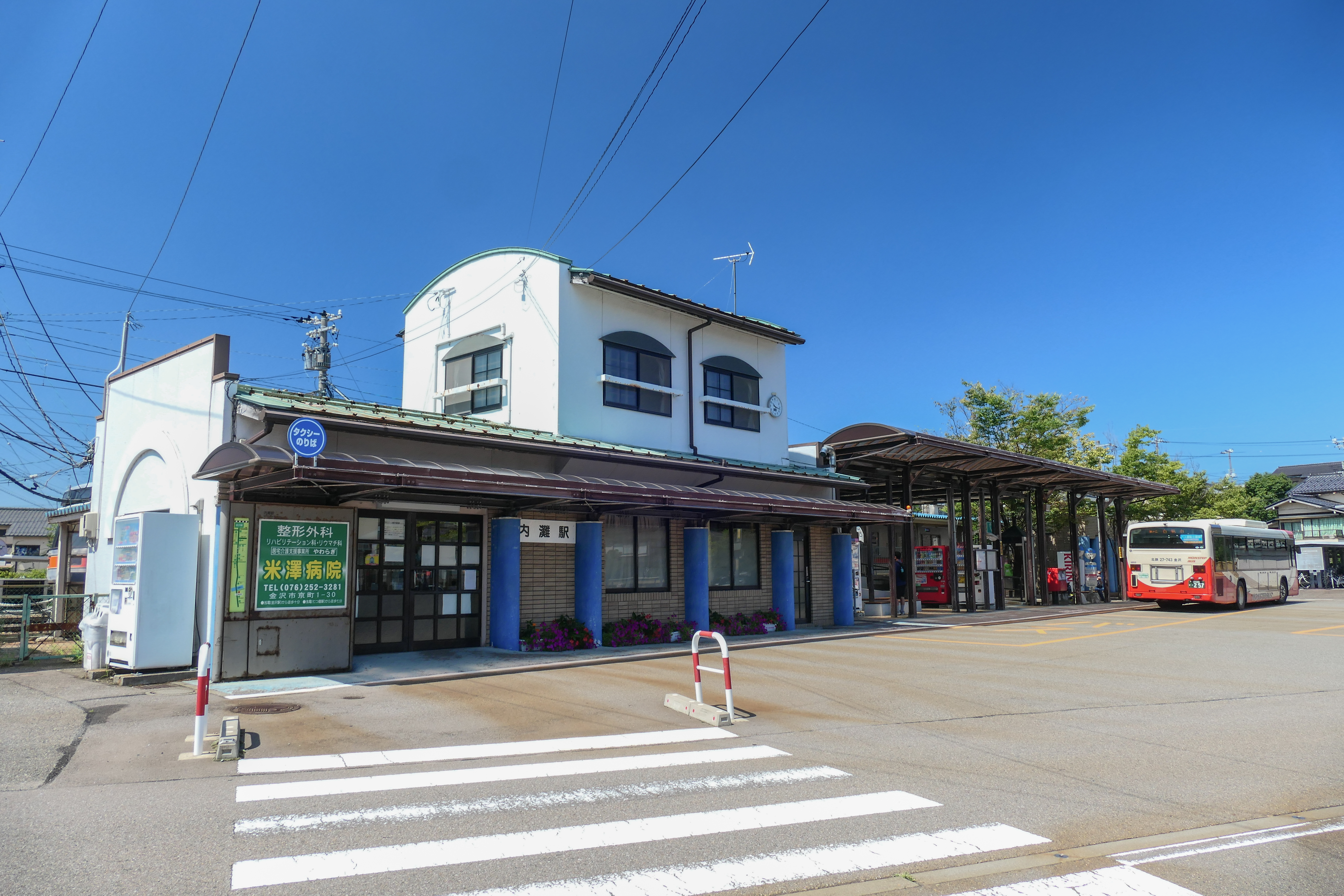
- Uchinada Station in July 2022

General information
- Location: Mukaiawagasaki, Uchinada-machi, Kahoku-hun, Ishikawa-ken 920-0274; Japan
- Coordinates: 36°38′0.25″N 136°38′3.49″E
- Operator: Hokuriku Railroad
- Line: ■ Asanogawa Line
- Distance: 6.7 km from Kanazawa
- Platforms: 1 side platform
- Tracks: 1

Other information
- Status: Staffed
- Website: Official website

History
- Opened: 6 January 1929

Passengers
- 2014: 2,572 daily

Services
Preceding station	Hokuriku Railroad	Following station
Awagasaki towards Hokutetsu-Kanazawa	Asanogawa Line	Terminus
Location
- Location within Japan

Uchinada Station (内灘駅, Uchinada-eki) is a railway station on the Hokuriku Railroad Asanogawa Line in Uchinada, Ishikawa, Japan, operated by the private railway operator Hokuriku Railroad (Hokutetsu).

== Info ==
=== Line ===
Uchinada Station is northern terminus of Hokuriku Railroad Asanogawa Line, and is located 6.7 kilometers from Kanazawa.

=== Station layout ===
The station consists of one side platform serving a single dead-headed track. The station is staffed.

== History ==
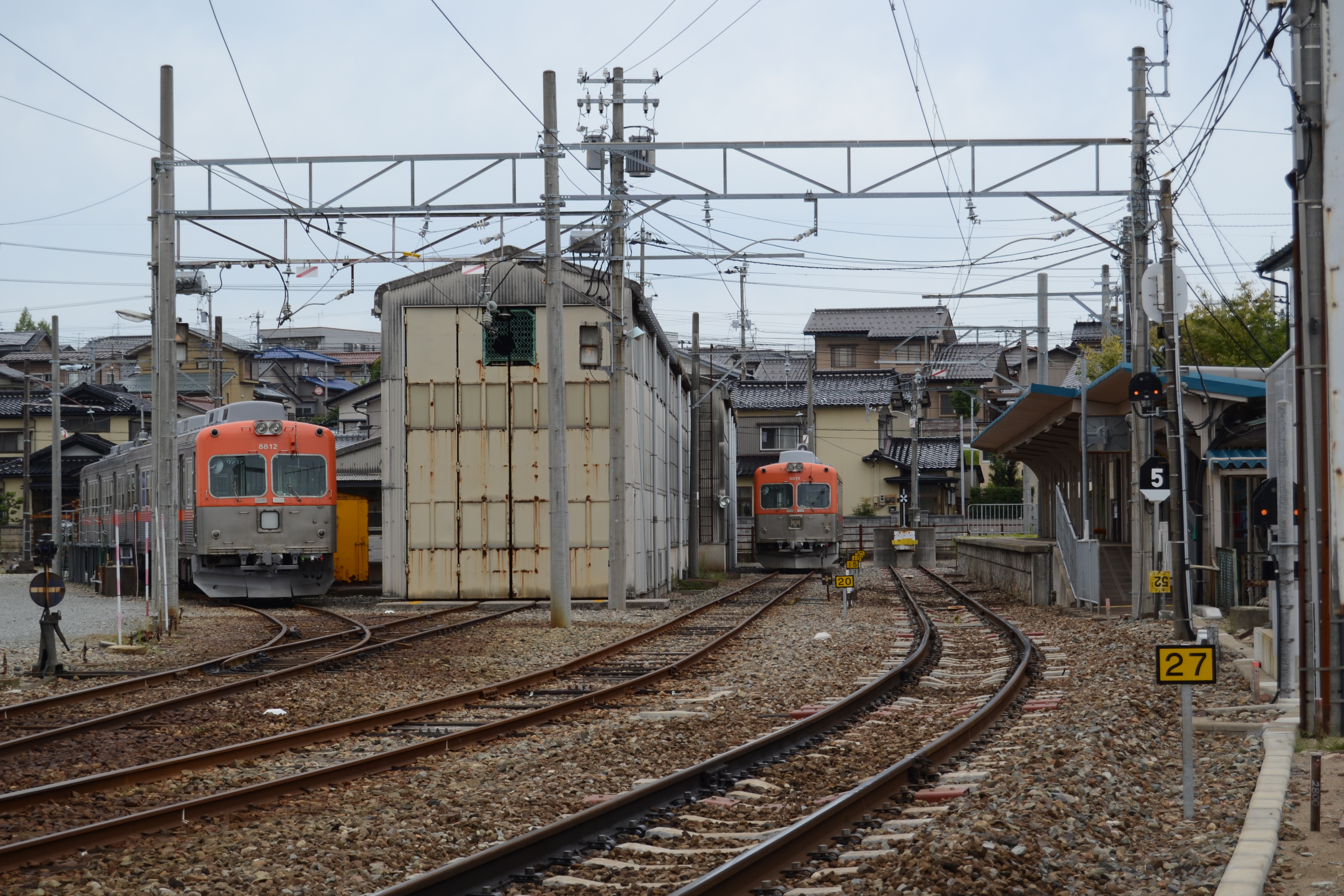
Uchinada station platform

Uchinada Station opened on 6 January 1929. It was relocated 100 meters from its original location and a new station building was constructed on 6 January 1960.

== Surrounding area ==
- Midoridai Community Center
- Hokkoku Bank Uchinada Branch
- Kanazawa Medical University
- Hamanasu Junior High School
- Mukaiawagasaki Elementary School
- Seiko Elementary School
- Tsurugaoka Elementary School
- Uchinada Town Office
- Tsurugaoka Post Office

== Passengers statistics ==
Uchinada Station passengers statistic
Year	Passengers/day
2001	2,574
2002	2,503
2003	2,497
2004	2,370
2005	2,372
2006	2,396
2007	2,448
2008	2,452
2009	2.333
2010	2.217
2011	2,142
2012	2,212
2013	2,321
2014	2,368

== See also ==
- List of railway stations in Japan
