= Hokuriku Railroad =

Railway company in Japan

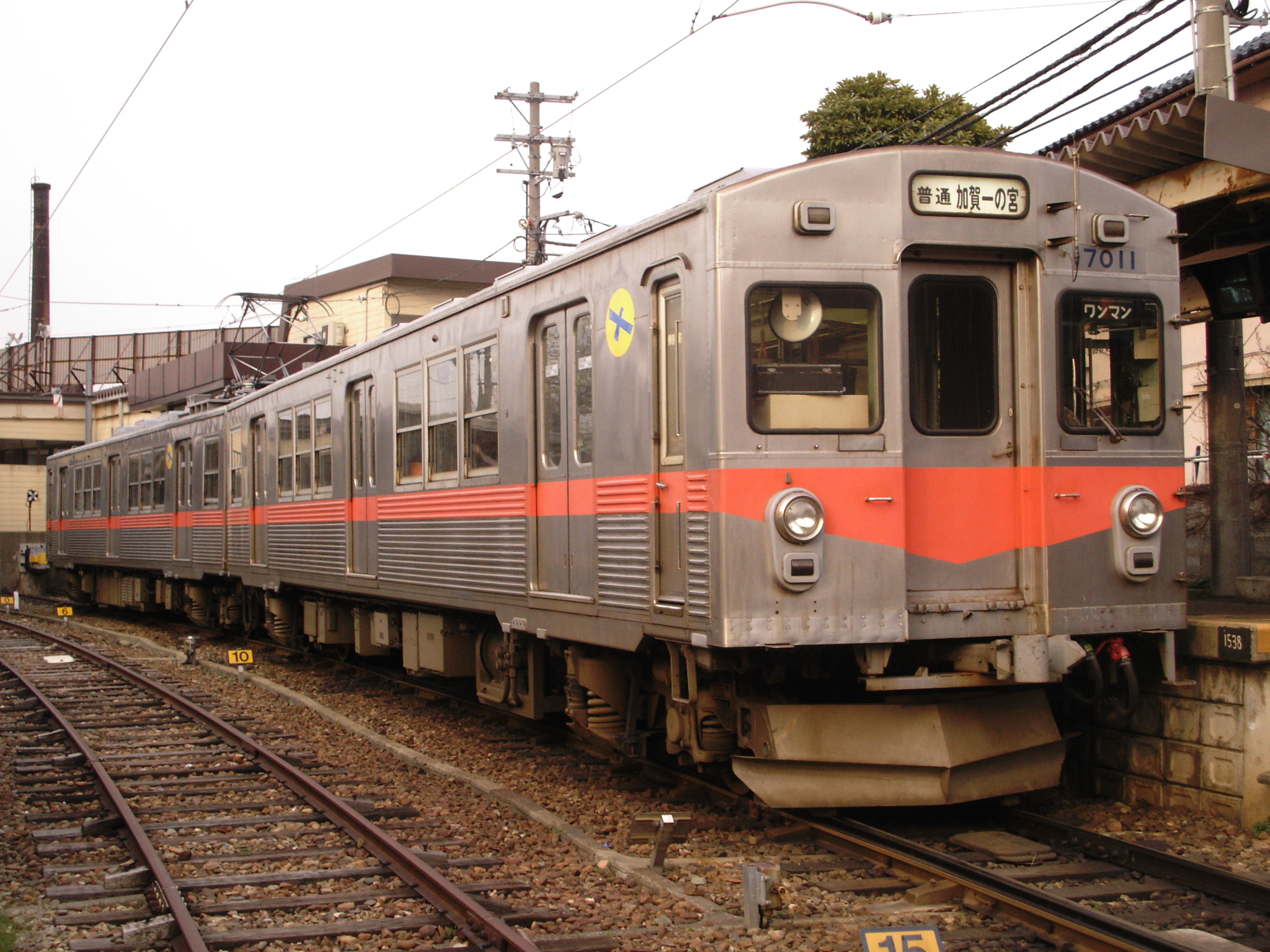
Ishikawa Line train.

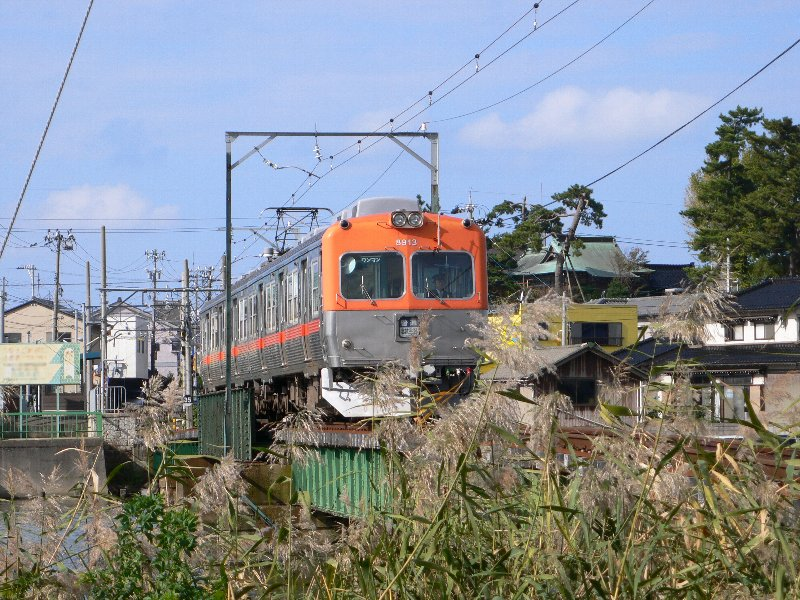
Asanogawa Line train.

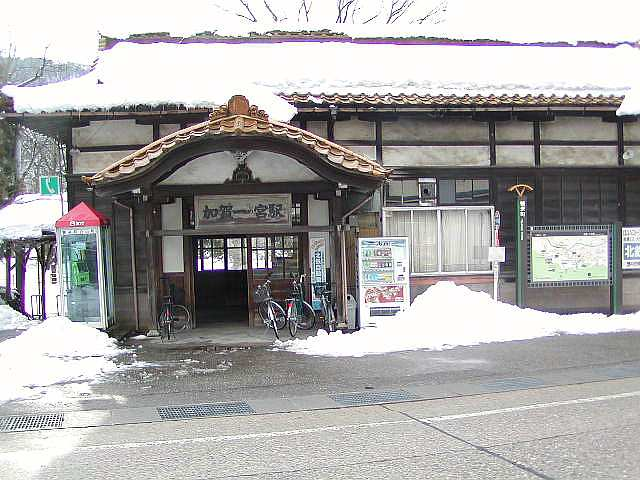
Kaga-Ichinomiya Station.

The Hokuriku Railroad (北陸鉄道, Hokuriku Tetsudō) is a transportation company in Kanazawa, Japan. The company or its lines are commonly known as Hokutetsu (北鉄). The company was founded in 1943, when all the private railway and bus operators in Ishikawa Prefecture were merged into one. Some of its lines, however, have their roots from horse car lines in the 19th century. Hokutetsu once had an extensive railway network in the prefecture with 13 heavy rail lines and 1 tram line, but only 2 heavy rail lines still survive today. Now the company primary functions as a bus operator. It also operates as the agency of All Nippon Airways in Kanazawa area.

Its lines accept ICa, a smart card ticketing system. However, railway lines only accept commuter passes, and do not support the standard prepaid fare functionality.

== Railway lines ==
Geographic map of the Hokuriku Railroad

=== Currently operational ===
■ Asanogawa Line (浅野川線): Hokutetsu-Kanazawa — Uchinada
■ Ishikawa Line (石川線): Nomachi — Tsurugi

=== Discontinued ===
Including the discontinued sections of current lines.

- Asanogawa Line (浅野川線): Uchinada — Awagasaki-Kaigan
- Ishikawa Line (石川線): Shiragikuchō — Nomachi
- Kanaiwa Line (金石線): Nakabashi — Ōno-Minato, Matsubara — Tōtōen
- Kinmei Line (金名線): Kaga-Ichinomiya — Hakusan-Shita
- Komatsu Line (小松線): Komatsu — Ukawa-Yūsenji
- Nomi Line (能美線): Shin-Terai — Tsurugi
- Noto Line (能登線): Hakui — Sanmyō
- Shōkin Line (松金線): Mattō — Nomachi
- Kanan Line (加南線)
  - Awazu Line (粟津線): Awazu-Onsen — Shin-Awazu
  - Iburihashi Line (動橋線): Uwano — Shin-Iburihashi.
    - Later merged with Link Line as Yamashiro Line (山代線).
  - Katayamazu Line (片山津線): Iburihashi — Katayamazu
  - Link Line (連絡線): Kanan — Awazu-Onsen.
    - Later merged with Iburihashi Line as Yamashiro Line.
  - Yamanaka Line (山中線): Yamanaka — Daishōji
- Kanazawa City Tram Line (金沢市内軌道線)

== Bus lines ==
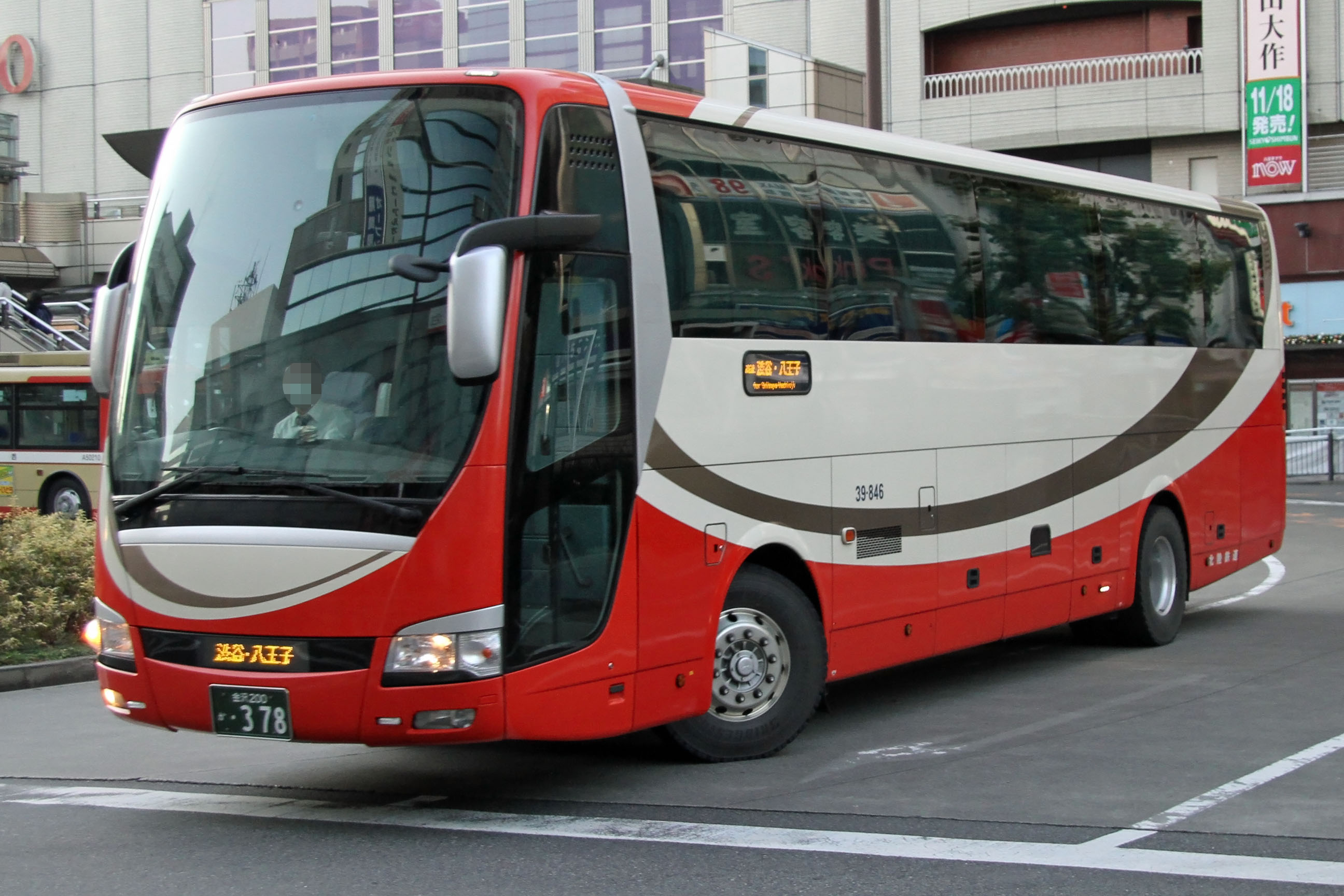
A highway bus of Hokuriku Railroad bound for Shibuya and Hachioji

Together with its subsidiaries, the Hokutetsu group dominates the bus lines in Ishikawa Prefecture. Hokuriku Railroad itself operates local buses inside Kanazawa City, which is the most important public transportation in the area. The company also operates highway buses linking the city and other parts of Japan, including Tokyo, Sendai, Niigata, Nagoya, Ōsaka, and Toyama.

== See also ==
- List of railway companies in Japan
