= List of oldest companies =

Oldest for-profit social endeavors

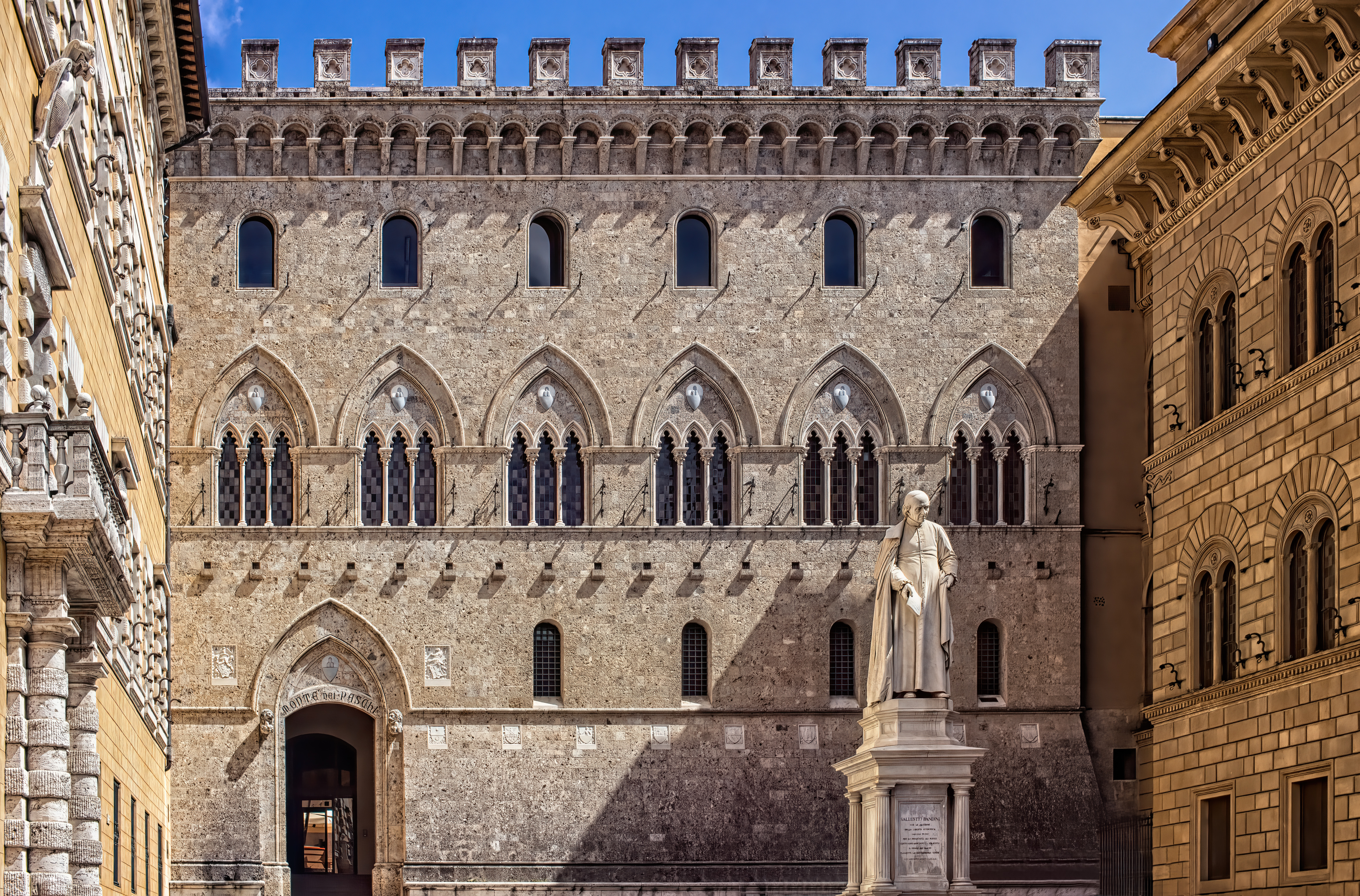
Banca Monte dei Paschi di Siena in Siena, Italy, is the oldest surviving bank in the world and Italy's third largest bank. It was founded in 1472.

The oldest companies in the world are the brands and companies which remain operating (either in whole or in part) since inception, excluding associations and educational, government, or religious organizations.

== Statistics ==
According to a report published by the Bank of Korea in 2008 that looked at 41 countries, there were 5,586 companies older than 200 years. Of these, 3,146 (56%) are in Japan, 837 (15%) in Germany, 222 (4%) in the Netherlands, and 196 (3%) in France. Of the companies with more than 100 years of history, most of them (89%) employ fewer than 300 people.

A nationwide survey conducted in 2019 identified more than 33,000 Japanese companies with histories of 100 years or more. These long-standing firms are known as shinise. They are governed by a management philosophy that prioritizes long-term continuity and generational succession over short-term profits.

== Founded before 1300 ==
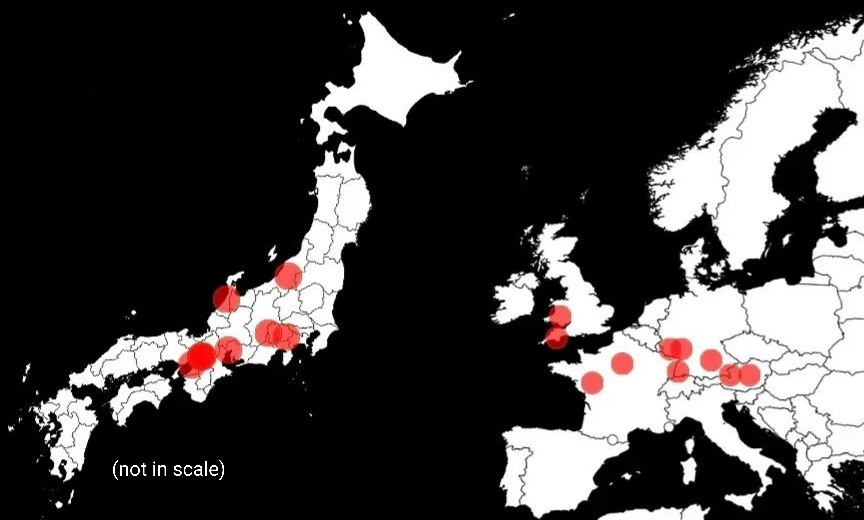
Locations of the 20 oldest operating companies

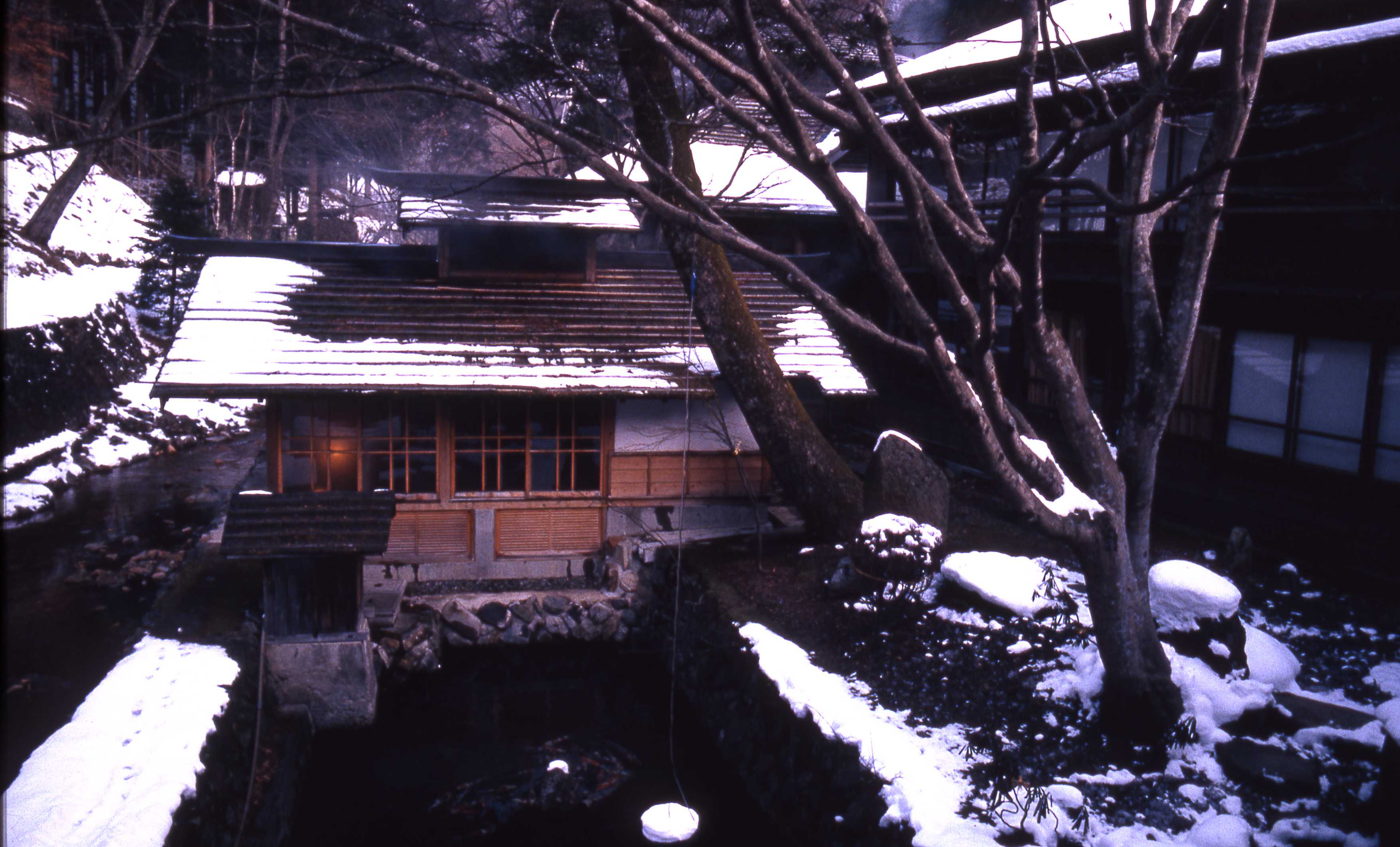
A spa bath at Hōshi Ryokan in the Awazu Onsen area of Komatsu, in Ishikawa Prefecture, Japan. The ryokan was established in 718 AD.

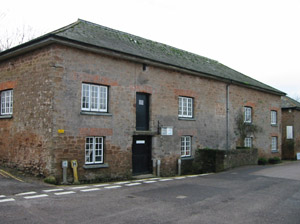
Established in 1068, Otterton Mill sits in the village of Otterton, near Budleigh Salterton in Devon, England.

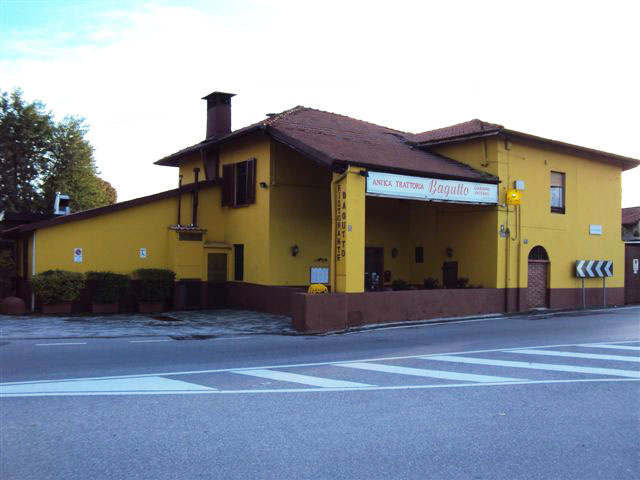
The Antica trattoria Bagutto in Milan, Italy, the oldest restaurant in Italy and the second in Europe.

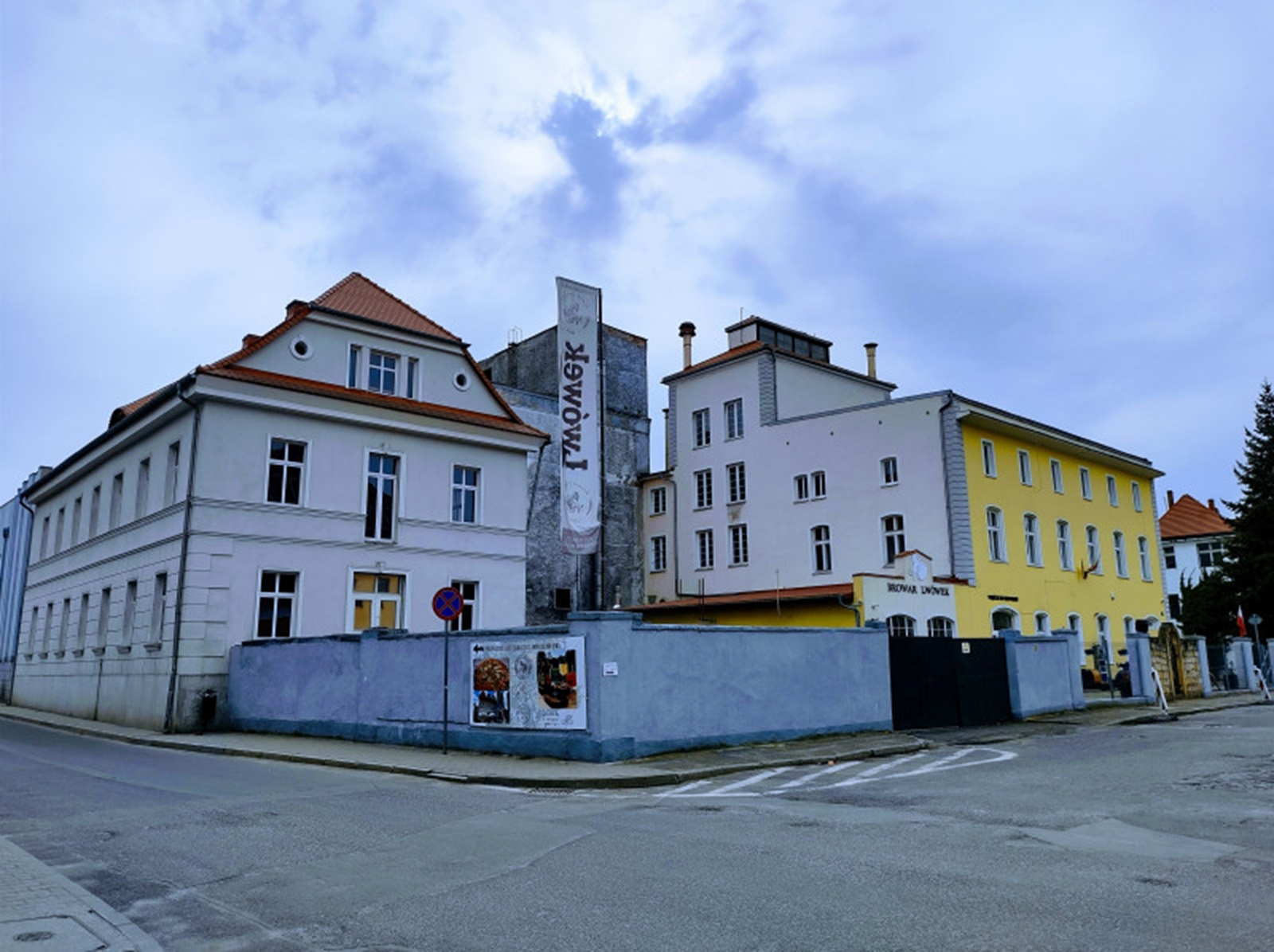
Browar Lwówek 1209 in Lwówek Śląski, Poland. The oldest, still functioning company in Poland, beating Bochnia Salt Mine

| Year | Company | Current location | Field | Sources |
|---|---|---|---|---|
| 578 | Kongō Gumi (Note: Subsidiary of Takamatsu Construction Group since 2006.) | Japan | Construction | |
| 705 | Nishiyama Onsen Keiunkan | Japan | Hotel | |
| 717 | Koman | Japan | Hotel | |
| 718 | Hōshi Ryokan | Japan | Hotel | |
| 771 | Genda Shigyō | Japan | Ceremonial paper goods | |
| 803 | St. Peter Stiftskulinarium | Austria | Restaurant | |
| 862 | Staffelter Hof | Germany | Wine | |
| 864 | Monnaie de Paris | France | Mint | |
| 885 | Tanaka-Iga | Japan | Religious goods | |
| 886 | The Royal Mint | United Kingdom | Mint | |
| 970 | Nakamura Shaji (Note: Subsidiary of Kongō Gumi since 2007.) | Japan | Construction | |
| 1000 | Château de Goulaine | France | Wine | |
| 1000 | Ichimonjiya Wasuke | Japan | Confectionery | |
| 1024 | Shumiya-Shinbutsuguten | Japan | Religious goods | |
| 1040 | Pontificia Fonderia Marinelli | Italy | Church bells | |
| 1040 | Weihenstephan Abbey | Germany | Brewery | |
| 1050 | Weltenburger | Germany | Brewery | |
| 1068 | Otterton Mill | United Kingdom | Watermill | |
| 1074 | Benediktinerstift Admont | Austria | Woodworking | |
| 1075 | Takahan Ryokan | Japan | Hotel | |
| 1100 | Schloss Johannisberg | Germany | Wine | |
| 1120 | Zum Roten Bären | Germany | Hotel | |
| 1131 | Hofbrauhaus Arolsen (Note: Legally re-incorporated in 1910 as "Hofbrauhaus Heinrich Brüne GmbH & Co. KG" when Heinrich Brüne purchased the (former) royal brewery "Hofbrauhaus Arolsen", although they continue to use the name Arolsen.) | Germany | Brewery | |
| 1134 | Geto Onsen | Japan | Hotel | |
| 1135 | Munke Mølle | Denmark | Mill | |
| 1135 | The Olde Bell | United Kingdom | Hotel | |
| 1136 | Aberdeen Harbour Board | United Kingdom | Harbour | |
| 1141 | Barone Ricasoli | Italy | Wine | |
| 1141 | Sudo Honke | Japan | Sake | |
| 1153 | Ma Yu Ching | China | Restaurant | |
| 1160 | Tsuen Tea | Japan | Tea | |
| 1177–1180 | Gorobee Ame | Japan | Confectionery | |
| 1184 | Fujito | Japan | Confectionery | |
| 1184 | Kikuoka | Japan | Herbs | |
| 1184 | Sakan Ryokan | Japan | Hotel | |
| 1189 | Ito Tekko | Japan | Metalworking | |
| 1190 | Shirasagiyu Tawaraya | Japan | Hotel | |
| 1190–1199 | Kotabe Foundry | Japan | Foundry | |
| 1191 | Tosen Goshobo | Japan | Hotel | |
| 1191 | Arima Onsen Okunobo | Japan | Hotel | |
| 1192 | Yoshinoya Irokuen | Japan | Hotel | |
| 1203 | Angel and Royal | United Kingdom | Hotel | |
| 1209 | Browar Lwówek 1209 | Poland | Brewery | |
| 1218 | Casa de Ganaderos de Zaragoza | Spain | Sheep farming | |
| 1220 | The Old Bell | United Kingdom | Hotel | |
| 1229 | Brauerei Hofstetten Krammer | Austria | Brewery | |
| 1230 (approx.) | Gasthof Sternen | Switzerland | Restaurant | |
| 1239 | Eyguebelle | France | Wine | |
| 1242 | The Bear Inn | United Kingdom | Pub | |
| 1245 | Gasthof zur Blume | Switzerland | Restaurant | |
| 1246 | Sanct Peter | Germany | Hotel | |
| 1248 | Bochnia | Poland | Salt | |
| 1249 | Adam & Eve | United Kingdom | Pub | |
| 1250 | Wieliczka | Poland | Salt | |
| 1250 | Drohobych | Ukraine | Salt | |
| 1266 | Freiberger Brauhaus | Germany | Brewery | |
| 1266 | Bolten-Brauerei | Germany | Brewery | |
| 1268 | Aldersbach | Germany | Brewery | |
| 1270 | Frapin | France | Cognac | |
| 1270 | Hirter | Austria | Brewery | |
| 1273 | Piwnica Świdnicka | Poland | Restaurant | |
| 1283 | Fürstenberg Brewery | Germany | Brewery | |
| 1283 | Rhanerbräu | Germany | Brewery | |
| 1284 | Antica trattoria Bagutto | Italy | Restaurant | |
| 1288 | Stora Enso | Sweden | Originally mining, currently paper | |
| 1293 | Moritaka Hamono | Japan | Blade Smith, Kitchen Knives | |
| 1295 | Barovier | Italy | Glass | |

== 1300 to 1399 ==
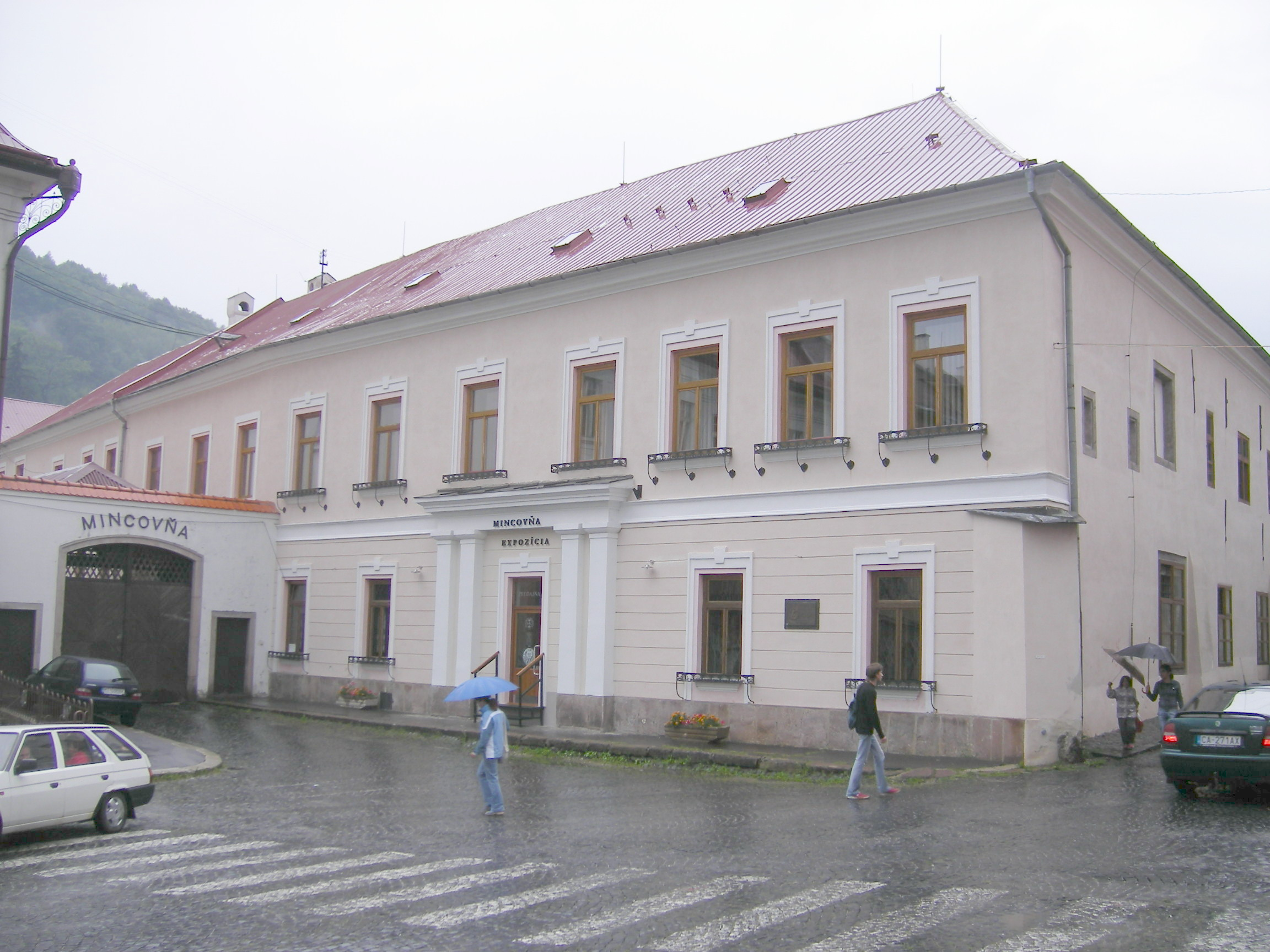
An image of the old Kremnica Mint building in Kremnica, central Slovakia. It is now an exposition of historical machines.

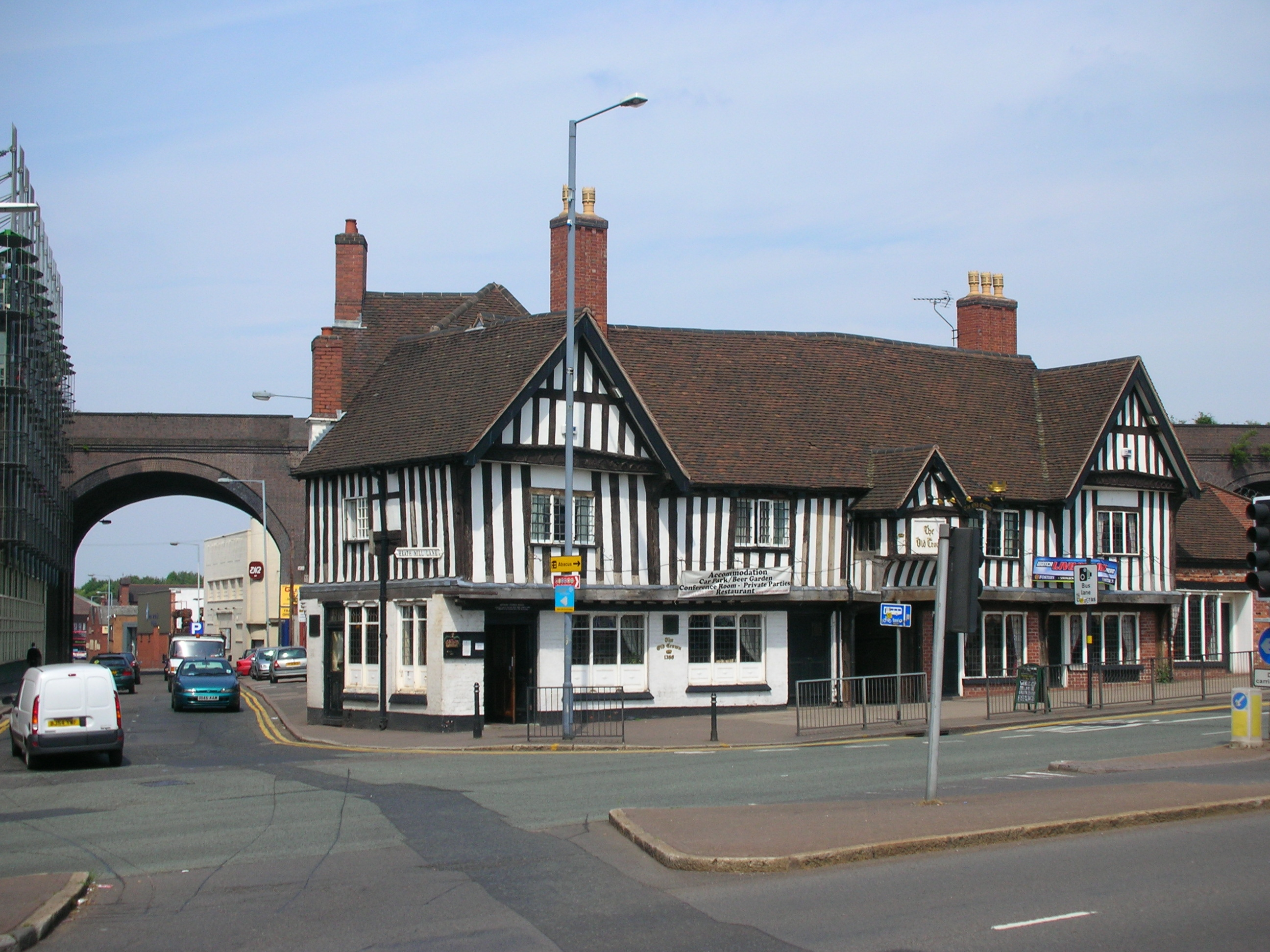
The Old Crown is a pub in Deritend, England, an historic area of Birmingham, and is the oldest extant secular building in Birmingham. It is Grade II* listed, and claims to date back to circa 1368.

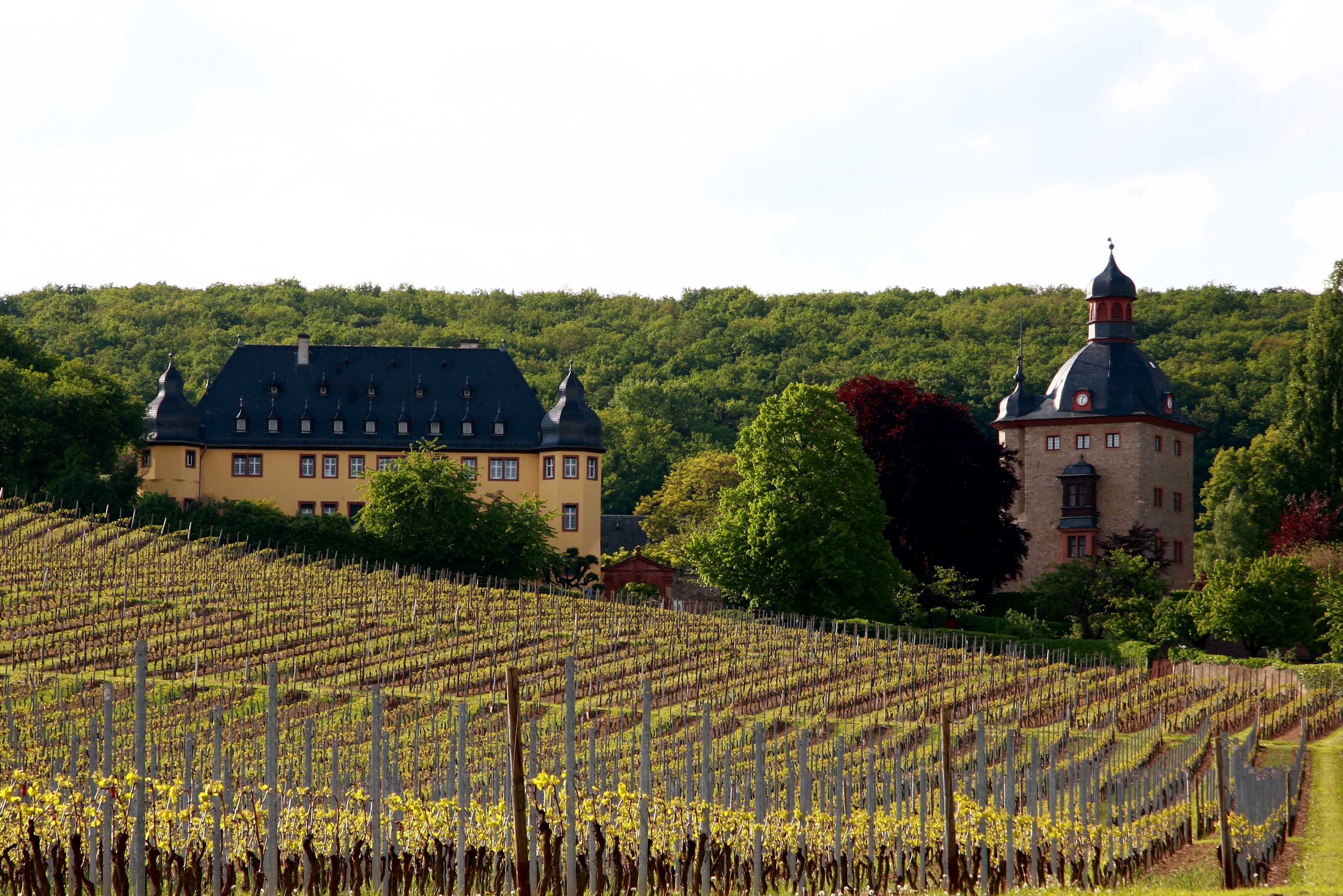
Schloss Vollrads is a castle and a wine estate in the Rheingau wine-growing region in Germany that claims to have been making wine for over 800 years.

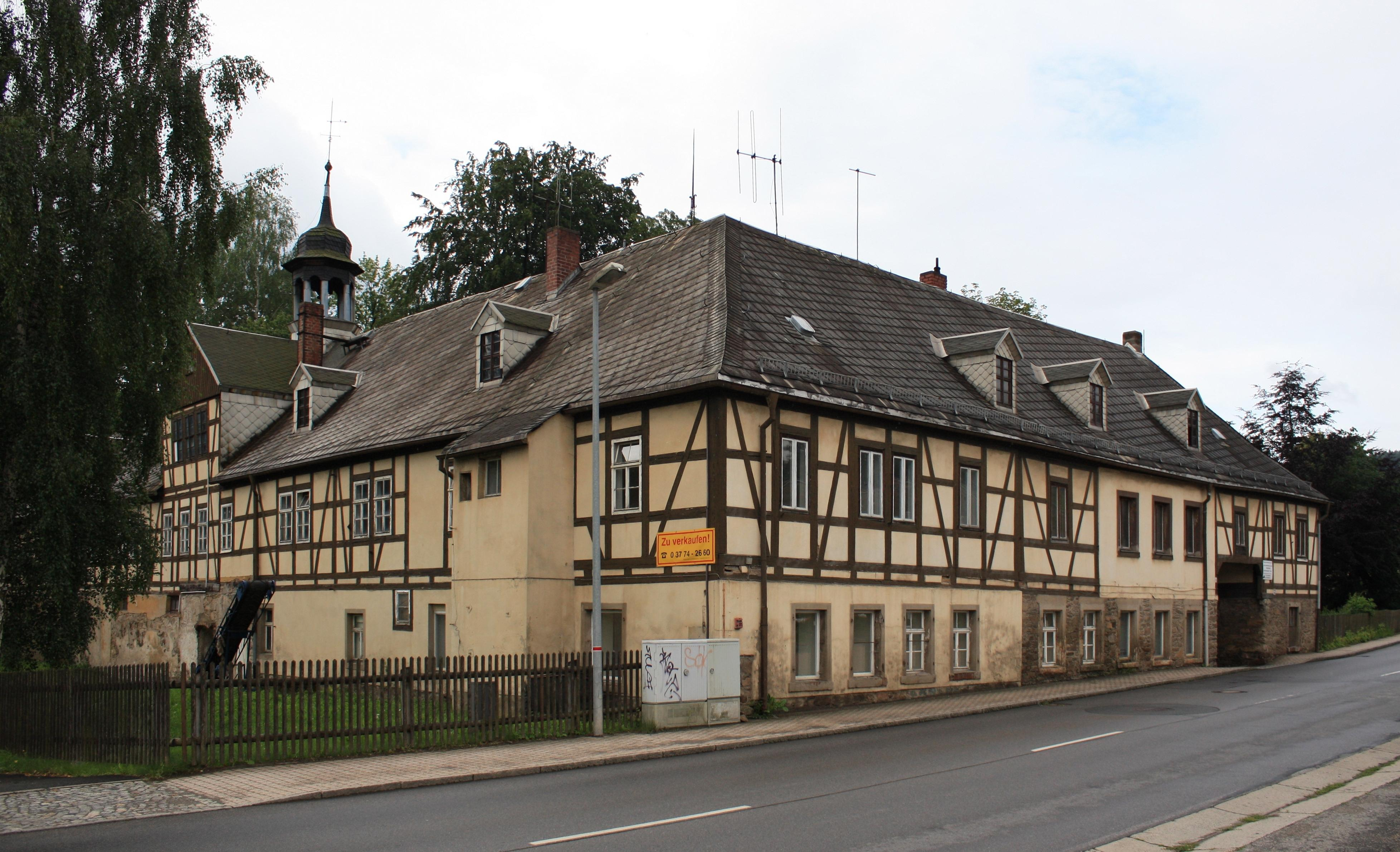
Erla Ironworks, metalworking factory − Herrenhof of the old hammer mill in Schwarzenberg (Ore Mountains)

| Year | Company | Current location | Field | Sources |
|---|---|---|---|---|
| 1300 | Kuchlbauer | Germany | Brewery | |
| 1300 | Orso Grigio | Italy | Hotel | |
| 1304 | Pilgrim Haus | Germany | Hotel | |
| 1308 | Aktienbrauerei Kaufbeuren | Germany | Brewery | |
| 1308 | Frescobaldi | Italy | Wine | |
| 1311 | Notoya | Japan | Hotel | |
| 1312 | Higashiya | Japan | Hotel | |
| 1313 | Bratwursthäusle Nürnberg | Germany | Restaurant | |
| 1313 | Landgasthof Mayr | Austria | Inn | |
| 1314 | Garley | Germany | Brewery | |
| 1318 | Rats-Apotheke | Germany | Pharmacy | |
| 1319 | Sankogan | Japan | Pharmacy | |
| 1321 | Browar Namysłów | Poland | Brewery | |
| 1323 | Interlaken | Switzerland | Hotel | |
| 1325 | The Old Bell | United Kingdom | Pub | |
| 1326 | Richard de Bas | France | Paper | |
| 1327 | Korenya Shingetsuan | Japan | Confectionery | |
| 1328 | Augustiner-Bräu | Germany | Brewery | |
| 1328 | Kremnica Mint | Slovakia | Mint | |
| 1329 | Kanbukuro | Japan | Confectionery | |
| 1330 | Schloss Vollrads | Germany | Wine | |
| 1331 | Hofpfisterei | Germany | Bakery | |
| before 1333 | Kuroda Sennendo | Japan | Confectionery | |
| 1334 | Gmachl | Austria | Hotel | |
| 1335 | Karthäuserhof | Germany | Wine | |
| 1337 | Maruya Hatchomiso | Japan | Miso | |
| 1340 | Brand | Netherlands | Brewery | |
| 1340 | Landgasthof Löwen | Switzerland | Restaurant | |
| 1345 | La Couronne | France | Restaurant | |
| 1346 | Goldene Gans | Germany | Brewery | |
| 1346 | Takata Courtrobe | Japan | Textile | |
| 1346 | Skyllbergs bruk | Sweden | Iron processing | |
| 1348 | Pivovar Broumov | Czech Republic | Brewery | |
| 1348 | Haus zum Rüden Zürich | Switzerland | Restaurant | |
| 1349 | Shiose | Japan | Confectionery | |
| 1349 | Gasthof zum Goldenen Sternen | Switzerland | Restaurant | |
| 1350 | Schmidberger | Austria | Blacksmith | |
| 1352 | Domaine des Molards | Switzerland | Vineyard | |
| 1354 | Zum Weinberg | Germany | Restaurant | |
| 1356 | Gasthof zum Bären | Switzerland | Restaurant | |
| 1357 | Hotel Storchen Zürich | Switzerland | Hotel | |
| 1363 | Franziskaner | Germany | Brewery | |
| 1364 | Löwen-Apotheke | Germany | Pharmacy | |
| 1366 | Stella Artois | Belgium | Brewery | |
| 1367 | H. Rüetschi | Switzerland | Bell | |
| 1368 | Old Crown | United Kingdom | Restaurant | |
| 1368 | Uirō (Japanese medicine) | Japan | Pharmacy | |
| 1369 | Torrini Firenze | Italy | Jewelry | |
| 1371 | Wynhus zum Bären | Switzerland | Restaurant | |
| 1375 | Al Cappello Rosso | Italy | Hotel | |
| 1378 | Einbecker | Germany | Brewery | |
| 1380 | Gastagwirt | Austria | Hotel | |
| 1380 | Roter Hahn | Germany | Hotel | |
| 1380 | Erla Ironworks | Germany | Ironworks | |
| 1383 | Löwenbräu | Germany | Brewery | |
| 1385 | Antinori | Italy | Wine | |
| 1386 | Riegele | Germany | Brewery | |
| 1387 | Veneranda Fabbrica del Duomo di Milano | Italy | Church | |
| 1389 | Engel-Apotheke | Switzerland | Pharmacy | |
| 1390 | Goldener Adler | Austria | Hotel | |
| 1390 | The Olde Bell | United Kingdom | Hotel | |
| 1392 | Matsumaeya | Japan | Sea weed | |
| 1394 | Allgäuer Brauhaus | Germany | Brewery | |
| 1395 | Namariichi | Japan | Chemicals | |
| 1396 | Hotel Adler | Switzerland | Hotel | |
| 1397 | Hotel de Draak | Netherlands | Hotel | |
| 1397 | Spaten | Germany | Brewery | |
| 1398 | Schnupp | Germany | Restaurant | |
| 1399 | Stein | Austria | Hotel | |

== 1400 to 1499 ==
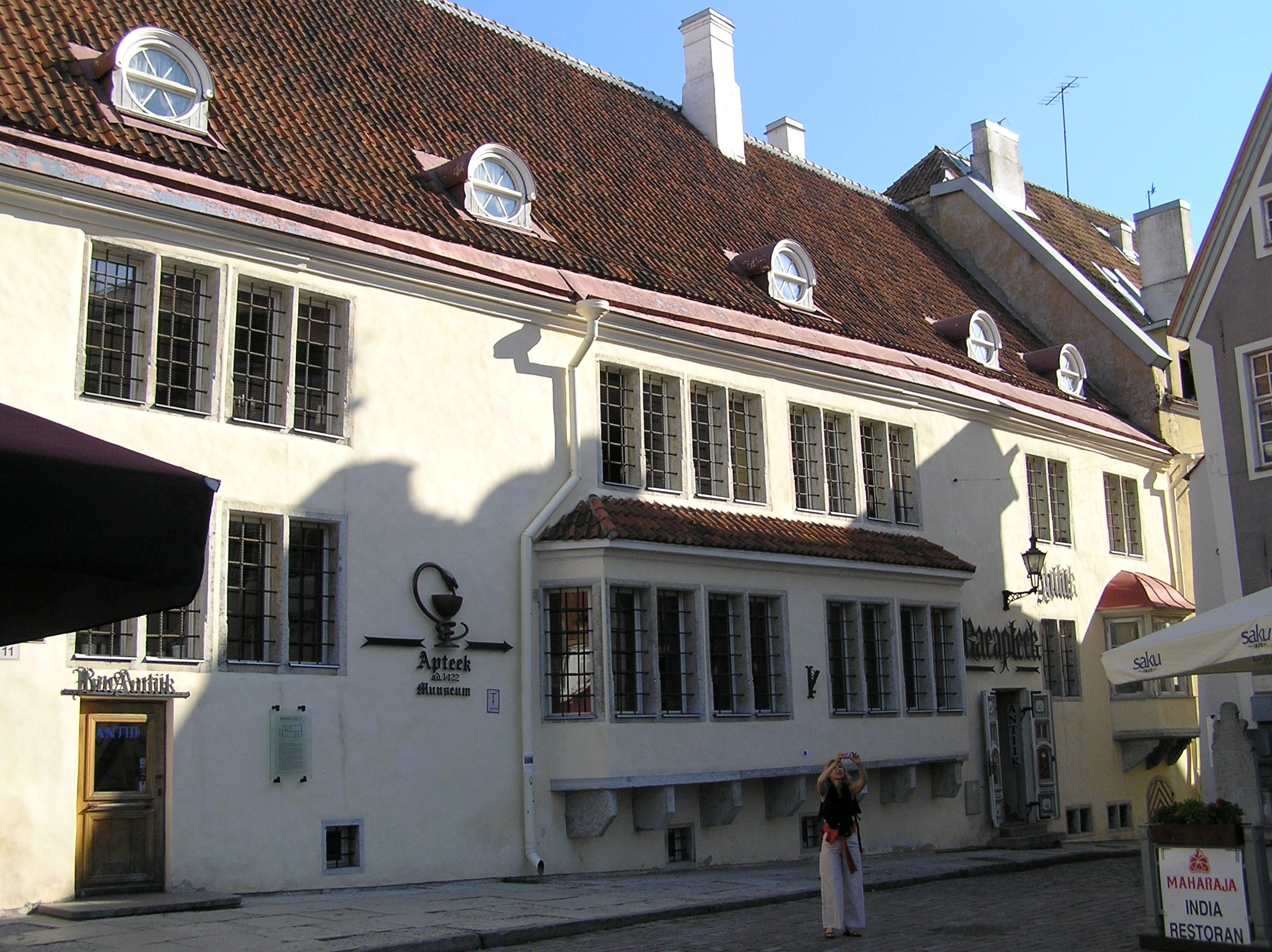
The Raeapteek in the center of Tallinn city, Estonia is one of the oldest continuously running pharmacies in Europe, having always been in business in the same exact house since the early 15th century. It is also the oldest commercial enterprise and the oldest medical establishment in Tallinn.

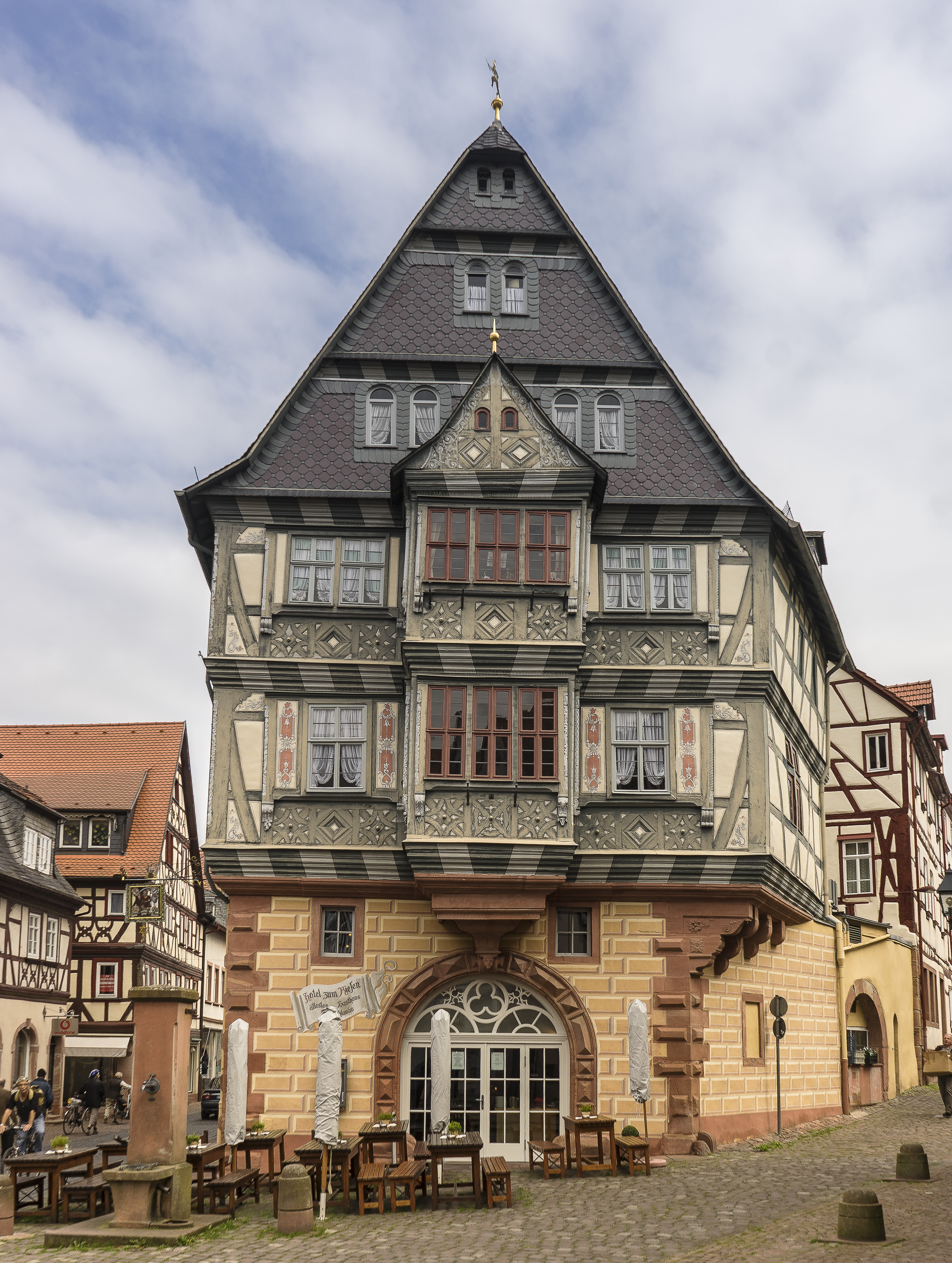
The Zum Riesen hotel in Miltenberg, Germany, 2014. Zum Riesen is one of the oldest hotels in Germany, dating back to at least 1411.

| Year | Company | Current location | Field | Sources |
|---|---|---|---|---|
| 1404 | Magnani 1404 | Italy | Paper | |
| 1405 | Ratskeller Bremen | Germany | Restaurant | |
| 1405 | Schlenkerla | Germany | Brewery | |
| 1410 | Schremser | Austria | Brewery | |
| 1411 | Zum Riesen | Germany | Restaurant | |
| 1412 | Gasthof zum Goldenen Sternen | Switzerland | Restaurant | |
| 1413 | Zum Stachel | Germany | Restaurant | |
| 1416 | Bianyifang | China | Restaurant | |
| 1418 | Krone | Switzerland | Hotel | |
| 1418 | Krumbad | Germany | Baths | |
| 1418 | Les Bonnets Rouges | France | Hotel | |
| 1419 | Barbarossa Hotel | Germany | Hotel | |
| 1421 | Kameya Mutsu | Japan | Confectionery | |
| 1422 | Raeapteek | Estonia | Pharmacy | |
| 1426 | Mühle Sting | Germany | Mill | |
| 1428 | Saku | Japan | Hotel | |
| 1428 | Yunushi Ichijoh | Japan | Hotel | |
| 1429 | Gablerbräu | Austria | Restaurant | |
| 1430 | Kronen | Germany | Brewery | |
| 1431 | Bratwurst-Röslein | Germany | Restaurant | |
| 1434 | Lodenwalker | Austria | Clothing | |
| 1435 | Schloss Sommerhausen | Germany | Wine | |
| 1435 | Hecht Am See | Switzerland | Restaurant | |
| 1436 | Wernesgrüner | Germany | Brewery | |
| 1437 | Moserhof | Austria | Hotel | |
| 1438 | Andechs | Germany | Restaurant | |
| 1438 | Camuffo di Portogruaro | Italy | Boat building | |
| 1439 | Weideneder | Germany | Brewery | |
| 1439 | Zum Goldenen Anker | Germany | Hotel | |
| 1441–1450 | Grafelijke Korenmolen | Netherlands | Mill | |
| 1446 | Rother Ochsen | Switzerland | Wine bar | |
| 1447 | Griechenbeisl | Austria | Restaurant | |
| 1447 | Hotel Krone | Austria | Hotel | |
| 1447 | Zötler | Germany | Brewery | |
| 1455 | Klosterbrauerei Andechs | Germany | Brewery | |
| 1457 | Doesburgsche Mosterd- en Azijnfabriek | Netherlands | Mustard factory | |
| 1458 | Zum Schwan | Germany | Hotel | |
| 1461 | Friedels Keller | Germany | Brewery | |
| 1461 | Hotel Lilie | Italy | Hotel | |
| 1461 | Surugaya | Japan | Confectionery | |
| 1462 | Eck | Germany | Brewery | |
| 1462 | Senkiya | Japan | Tea | |
| 1463 | Geska | Switzerland | Cheese | |
| 1465 | Weingut Geierslay | Germany | Wine | |
| 1465 | Owariya | Japan | Restaurant | |
| 1466 | Berg Brauerei | Germany | Brewery | |
| 1466 | Gallet & Co. | Switzerland | Clock | |
| 1467 | Inoue | Japan | Tea | |
| 1470 | Jean Roze | France | Textiles | |
| 1470 | Mazlo | France | Jeweler | |
| 1472 | Bad Osterfingen | Switzerland | Restaurant | |
| 1472 | Hirschgasse | Germany | Hotel | |
| 1472 | Banca Monte dei Paschi di Siena | Italy | Bank | |
| 1473 | Banca del Monte di Bologna | Italy | Bank | |
| 1473 | Gebrüder Weiss | Austria | Transport | |
| 1473 | Steiger | Slovakia | Brewery | |
| 1474 | Kindli | Switzerland | Hotel | |
| 1475 | La Rochere | France | Glass | |
| 1476 | Pfahnl | Austria | Mill | |
| 1477 | Hirzinger | Germany | Hotel | |
| 1477 | Ratskeller Erfurt | Germany | Restaurant | |
| 1477 | Mizuta Gyokuundo | Japan | Confectionery | |
| 1478 | Warka | Poland | Brewery | |
| 1479 | Cassa di Risparmio di Savona | Italy | Bank | |
| 1482 | Isabellenhütte Heusler | Germany | Industry | |
| 1483 | Zur Sonne | Switzerland | Restaurant | |
| 1485 | Krone | Germany | Restaurant | |
| 1487 | Hiraizumi | Japan | Sake | |
| 1488 | Rathbornes Candles | Ireland | Candles | |
| 1488 | Banca Monte Parma | Italy | Bank | |
| 1488 | Schwabe | Switzerland | Publisher | |
| 1489 | Banca del Monte di Lucca | Italy | Bank | |
| 1491 | Sommerhuber | Austria | Ceramics | |
| 1492 | Stieglbrauerei zu Salzburg | Austria | Brewery | |
| 1492 | Hofmühl | Germany | Brewery | |
| 1492 | Haeberlein | Germany | Bakery | |
| 1493 | Bürgerbräu Bad Reichenhall | Germany | Brewery | |
| 1495 | Baronnie de Coussergues | France | Wine | |
| 1497 | Raventós i Blanc | Spain | Wine | |
| 1498 | Goldenes Posthorn | Germany | Restaurant | |
| 1498 | The Shore Porters Society | United Kingdom | Transport | |
| 1499 | U Fleků | Czech Republic | Brewery | |

== 1500 to 1599 ==
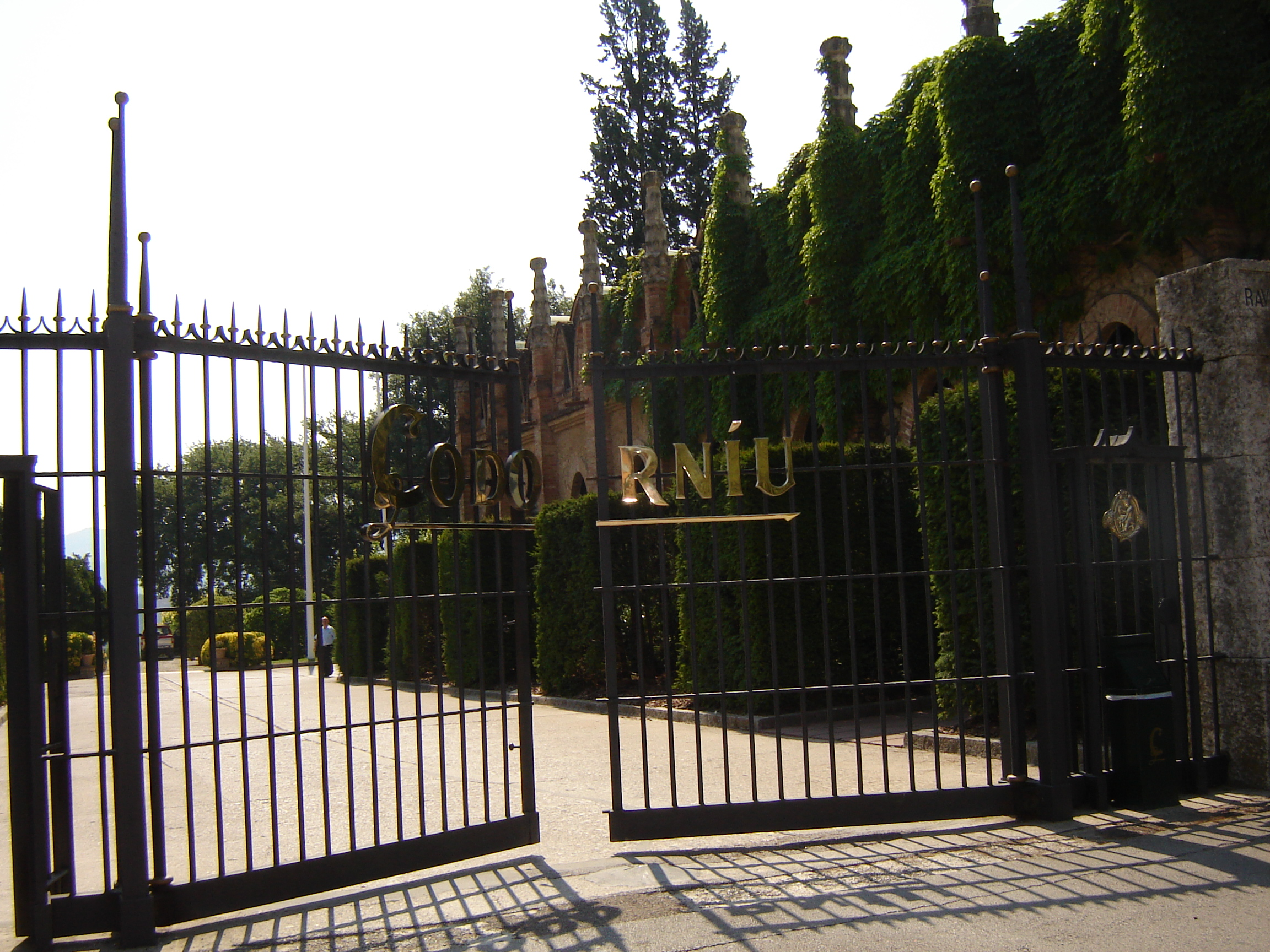
The entrance gate to the domains of the Codorníu Winery, Spain

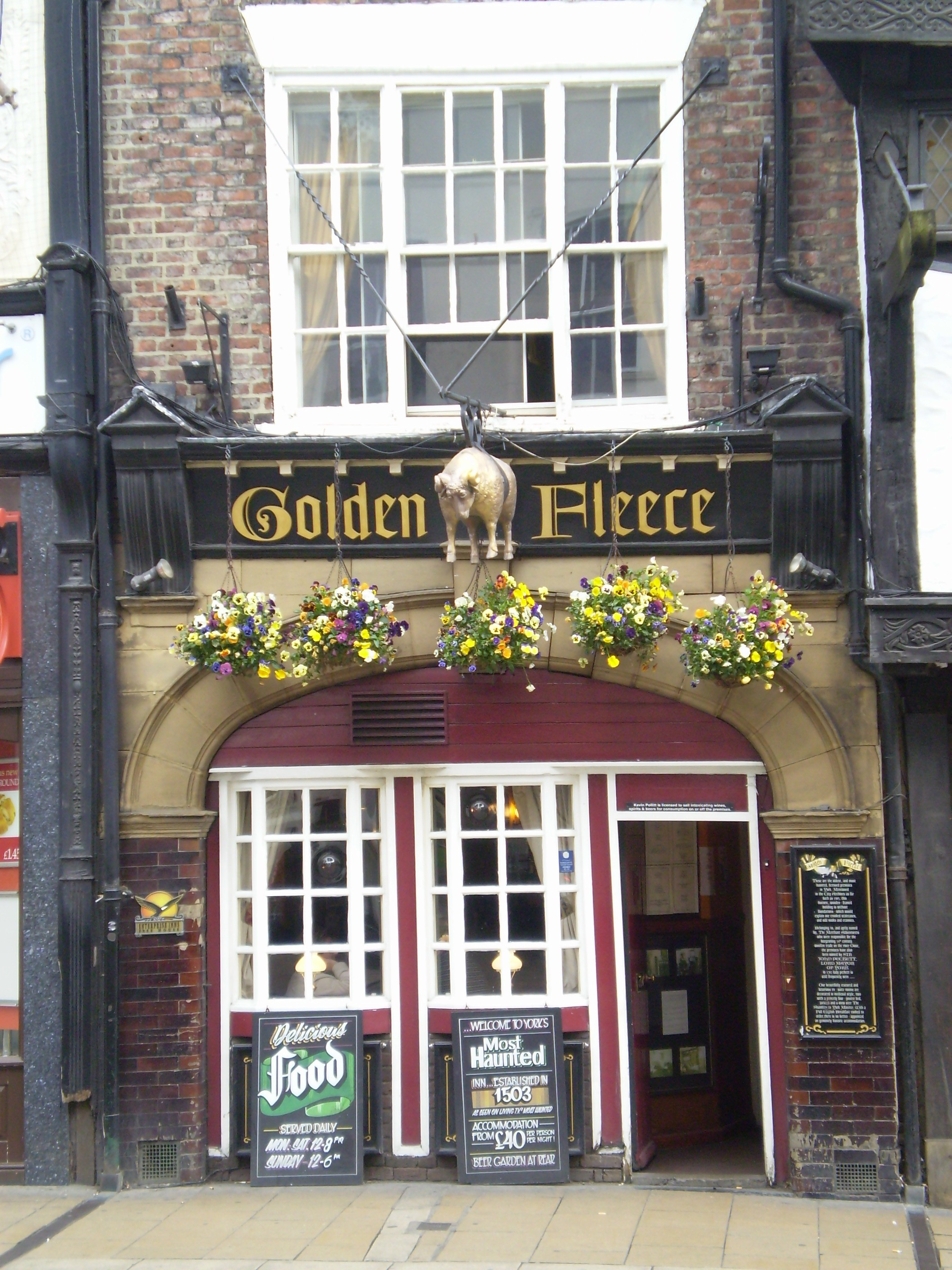
The Golden Fleece Inn in York, England

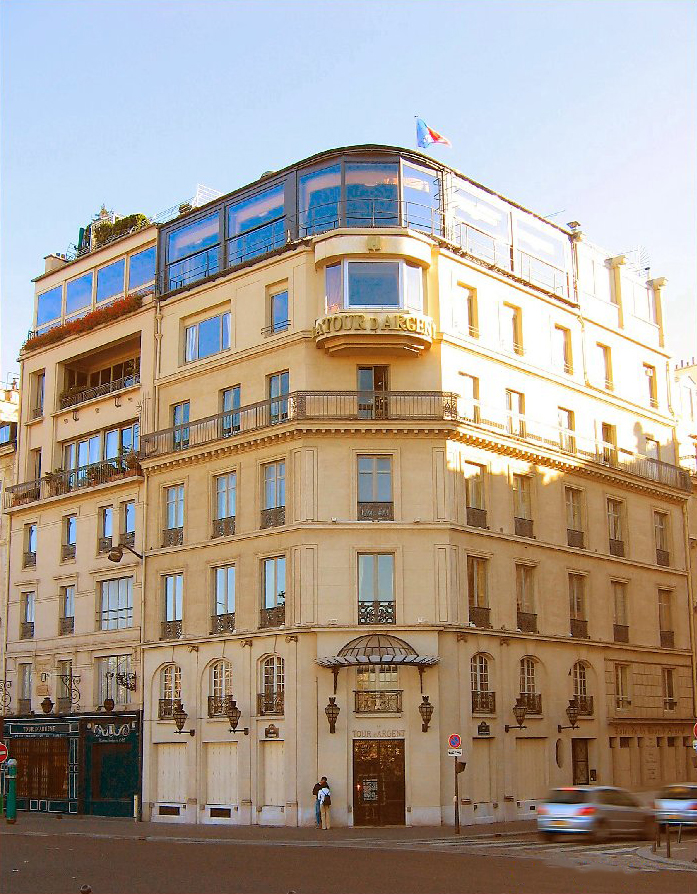
The Tour d'Argent restaurant in Paris, France

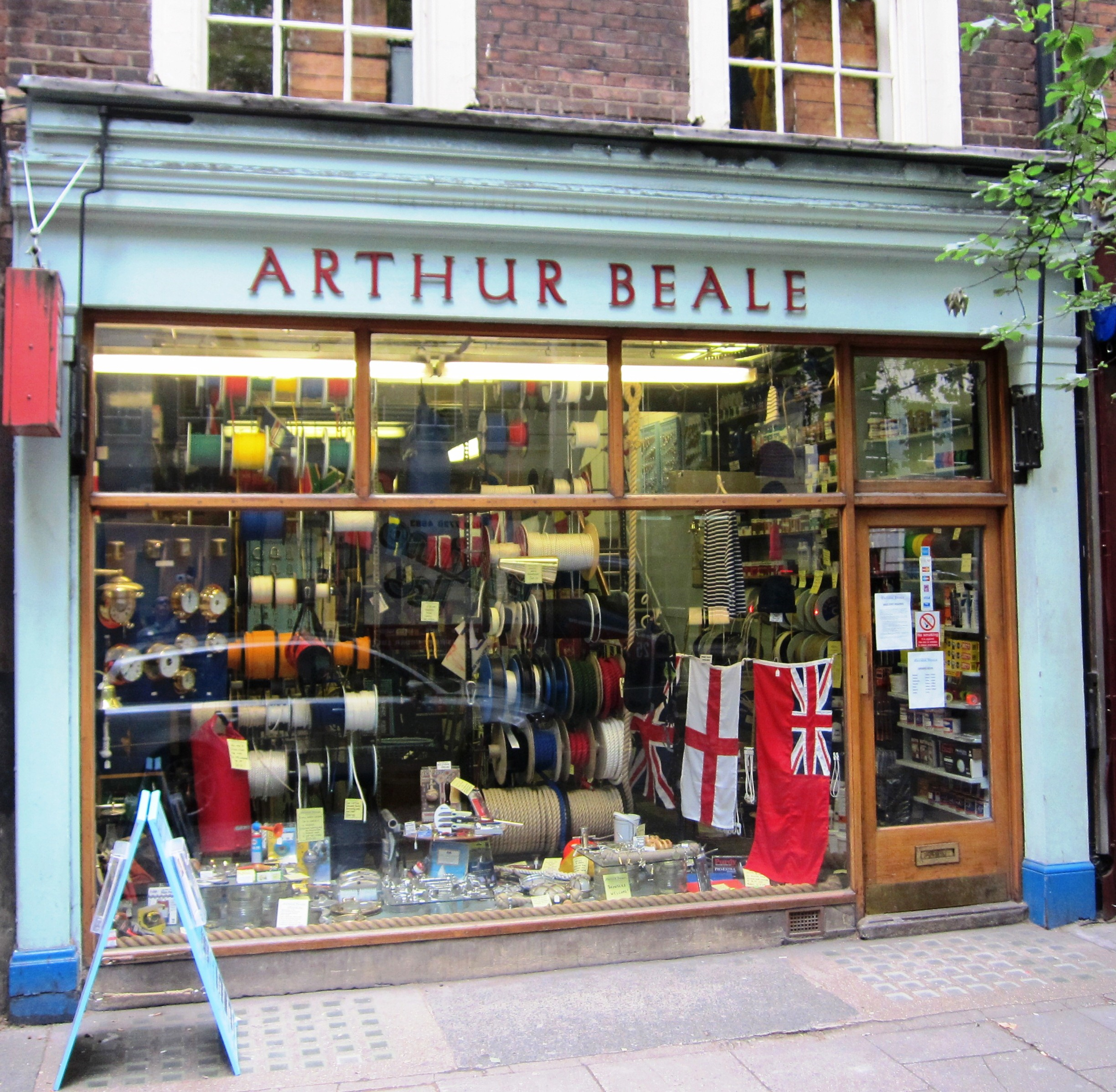
The chandler Arthur Beale in London, UK

| Year | Company | Current location | Field | Sources |
|---|---|---|---|---|
| circa 1500 | Ammerndorfer | Germany | Mill | |
| 1500 | Arthur Beale | United Kingdom | Chandler | |
| 1500 | Ubaldo Grazia | Italy | Pottery | |
| 1501 | Fukkodo | Japan | Brushes | |
| 1502 | Tsutaya | Japan | Confectionery | |
| 1502 | Chigira Jinsentei | Japan | Hotel | |
| 1503 | Golden Fleece Inn | United Kingdom | Pub | |
| 1503 | Hacklwirt | Austria | Restaurant | |
| 1503 | Kawabata Doki | Japan | Confectionery | |
| 1504–1520 | Ishiga Honten | Japan | Religious goods | |
| before 1505 | Kenbishi | Japan | Sake | |
| 1506 | Herold | Czech Republic | Brewery | |
| 1509 | Roter Hirsch | Germany | Restaurant | |
| 1514 | Brauerei Göller | Germany | Brewery | |
| 1514 | Hampton Ferry | United Kingdom | Ferry | |
| 1514 | Trinity House | United Kingdom | Lighthouse | |
| 1515 | R J Balson & Son | United Kingdom | Butcher | |
| 1515 | Café Vlissinghe | Belgium | Restaurant | |
| 1516 | Zeilinger | Austria | Metalwork | |
| 1516 | White Hart Inn | United Kingdom | Pub | |
| 1517 | Měšťanský pivovar v Poličce | Czech Republic | Brewery | |
| 1517 | Salzbergwerk Berchtesgaden | Germany | Salt | |
| 1519 | Orell Füssli Holding AG | Switzerland | Holding | |
| before 1520 | Toraya | Japan | Confectionery | |
| 1520 | CTT Correios de Portugal, S.A. | Portugal | National Postal Service | |
| 1521 | Spiegelau Glas | Germany | Glass | |
| 1524 | Schöllnitzer | Germany | Distillery | |
| 1524 | Hostal de Pinós | Spain | Restaurant | |
| 1525 | Auerbachs Keller Leipzig | Germany | Restaurant | |
| 1526 | Bären Twann | Switzerland | Hotel | |
| 1526 | Beretta | Italy | Firearms | |
| 1526 | Bratwurst Herzle | Germany | Restaurant | |
| 1530 | William Prym | Germany | Metalwork | |
| 1530 | Liubiju | China | Pickle | |
| 1532 | Yamaji | Japan | Sake | |
| 1532 | Honke Kojima | Japan | Confectionery | |
| 1532 | Raths-Apotheke (Bremen) | Germany | Pharmacy | |
| 1533 | Klosterbräu Bamberg | Germany | Restaurant | |
| 1533 | Zvon | Czech Republic | Hotel | |
| 1534 | Cambridge University Press | United Kingdom | Publishing | |
| 1534 | Ur-Krostitzer | Germany | Brewery | |
| 1534 | Matsuokaya | Japan | Sauce | |
| 1534 | La Casa de Moneda de México | Mexico | Mint | |
| 1534 | Tomita Sake Brewery | Japan | Sake | |
| 1535 | Gottsmannsgrüner | Germany | Brewery | |
| 1536 | Izumiya Ryokan | Japan | Hotel | |
| 1538 | Ye Olde Cheshire Cheese | United Kingdom | Pub | |
| 1539 | Banco di Napoli | Italy | Bank | |
| 1540 | Shusen Kurano | Japan | Sake | |
| 1541 | John Brooke & Sons | United Kingdom | Real estate | |
| 1542 | Urs und Viktor | Switzerland | Restaurant | |
| 1542 | Wolferstetter | Germany | Brewery | |
| 1543 | Köstritzer | Germany | Brewery | |
| 1543 | Hof-Apotheke (Coburg) | Germany | Pharmacy | |
| 1545 | Touwfabriek G. van der Lee | Netherlands | Rope | |
| 1545 | Roman Brewery | Belgium | Brewery | |
| 1546 | Fubokaku | Japan | Hotel | |
| 1547 | Kunitomo Kyutaro | Japan | Gunpowder | |
| 1548 | Can Bonastre | Spain | Wine | |
| 1548 | Yoshinogawa | Japan | Sake | |
| 1550 | Konishi Sake Brewery | Japan | Sake | |
| 1550 | Riess | Austria | Metalwork | |
| 1550 | Sasaiya | Japan | Confectionery | |
| 1550 | Izeki | Japan | Clothing | |
| 1551 | De Zalm | Netherlands | Hotel | |
| 1551 | Hof Apotheke (Stuttgart) | Germany | Pharmacy | |
| 1551 | Codorníu | Spain | Wine | |
| 1551 | Itamuro Onsen Daikokuya | Japan | Food | |
| 1552 | Fonjallaz | Switzerland | Wine | |
| 1553 | Piesslinger | Austria | Aluminium | |
| 1554 | De Vergulde Hand | Netherlands | Soap | |
| 1554 | Meien | Japan | Salt | |
| 1555 | Chiso | Japan | Clothing | |
| 1555 | Chikiriya Jihei | Japan | Clothing | |
| before 1558 | Kaikodo | Japan | Lacquerware | |
| 1558 | Kanbayashi Shunsho | Japan | Tea | |
| 1558 | Ueda | Japan | Sake | |
| 1559 | Kastner | Austria | Confectionery | |
| 1560 | Aritsugu | Japan | Knives | |
| 1560 | Nabeya | Japan | Metalwork | |
| 1560 | Okamoto | Japan | Iron | |
| 1560 | Hasemoku | Japan | Real estate | |
| 1560 | Ichijoh | Japan | Hotel | |
| 1560 | Toyahachi | Japan | Pottery retail | |
| 1561 | Alföldi Nyomda | Hungary | Printing | |
| 1561 | Achkarren Krone | Germany | Hotel | |
| 1561 | SS Annunziata | Italy | Perfume | |
| 1561 | Farmàcia 1561 (Barcelona) | Spain | Pharmacy | |
| 1561 | Yamagatakan | Japan | Hotel | |
| 1562 | Otaya Hanuemon | Japan | Confectionery | |
| 1563 | Istituto Bancario San Paolo di Torino | Italy | Bank | |
| 1563 | Shima Tamura | Japan | Hotel | |
| 1563 | Kojiya | Japan | Food | |
| 1564 | Svijany | Czech Republic | Brewery | |
| 1565 | Casa de Moneda de Lima | Peru | Mint | |
| 1565 | Taiko Mochi | Japan | Confectionery | |
| 1566 | Nishikawa | Japan | Beds | |
| 1567 | Arcobräu | Germany | Brewery | |
| 1567 | Liuquanju | China | Restaurant | |
| 1568 | Gasthof Herold | Germany | Brewery | |
| 1568 | Kichijiya | Japan | Oil | |
| 1568 | Poschinger | Germany | Glass | |
| 1569 | Edegger-Tax | Austria | Bakery | |
| 1569 | Kovačka radionica - Zonić Ahmo i Nermin | Bosnia and Herzegovina | Blacksmith | |
| 1570 | Einhorn Apotheke | Germany | Pharmacy | |
| 1570 | Klášter | Czech Republic | Brewery | |
| 1570 | Schwarzer Adler | Austria | Hotel | |
| 1570 | Suishodo | Japan | Pharmacy | |
| 1570 | Isekusuri Honpo | Japan | Pharmacy | |
| 1570–1600 | Kikuhime | Japan | Sake | |
| 1572 | Royal Tichelaar Makkum | Netherlands | Ceramics | |
| 1572 | Yoshida Gennojo | Japan | Religious goods | |
| 1573 | Luzhou Laojiao | China | Distillery | |
| 1573 | Hosoji Inbanten | Japan | Stamps | |
| 1573 | Nakano | Japan | Fish | |
| 1573 | Muroji | Japan | Sauce | |
| 1573 | Otsuya | Japan | Retailing | |
| 1573–1592 | Shintsu | Japan | Building material | |
| 1573–1592 | Sonodaya | Japan | Confectionery | |
| 1573–1592 | Kanbayashi | Japan | Tea | |
| 1573–1592 | Mitsuboshien Kanbayashi Sannyu | Japan | Tea | |
| 1573–1592 | Ishikawa | Japan | Stone | |
| 1574 | Dopff au Moulin | France | Wine | |
| 1574 | Glossner | Germany | Brewery | |
| 1575 | Nikenjayamochi Kadoya | Japan | Brewery | |
| 1575 | Lucas Bols | Netherlands | Distillery | |
| 1575 | Meboso Hachirobee | Japan | Fishing flies | |
| 1575 | Yanagiya Hozen | Japan | Confectionery | |
| 1575 | Nippon Kodo | Japan | Incense | |
| 1576 | Heihachi Jaya | Japan | Restaurant | |
| 1576 | Kishigon | Japan | Hotel | |
| 1576 | Gyokueido | Japan | Confectionery | |
| 1577 | Kobaien | Japan | Ink | |
| 1577 | Mineyo | Japan | Fish | |
| 1578 | Holzhausen | Austria | Printing | |
| 1578 | Klett | Germany | Firearms | |
| 1578 | Lamp no Yado | Japan | Hotel | |
| 1578 | Tomihiro | Japan | Clothing | |
| 1579 | Hof-Apotheke (Sigmaringen) | Germany | Pharmacy | |
| 1579 | Kiguraya | Japan | Clothing | |
| 1579 | Nakaya | Japan | Herbal medicine | |
| circa 1580 | Higashimaru | Japan | Sauce | |
| 1581 | Royal Brewery of Krušovice | Czech Republic | Brewery | |
| 1582 | Hatano Paint | Japan | Paint | |
| 1582 | Indenya | Japan | Leather | |
| 1582 | Koju | Japan | Incense | |
| 1582 | La Tour d'Argent | France | Restaurant | |
| 1582 | Onomichi | Japan | Vinegar | |
| 1582 | Piana Clerico | Italy | Cloth | |
| 1582 | Pivovar Krakonoš | Czech Republic | Brewery | |
| 1582 | Tamaruya | Japan | Udon noodles | |
| 1582 | Thorbräu | Germany | Brewery | |
| 1582 | Minowa | Japan | Lacquerware | |
| 1582 | MaYinglong | China | Pharmacy | |
| 1583 | Gnomenkeller | Germany | Restaurant | |
| 1584 | Çemberlitaş Hamamı | Turkey | Turkish bath | |
| 1584 | Dragseths | Germany | Restaurant | |
| 1584 | Erizen | Japan | Clothing | |
| 1584 | Gosset | France | Champagne | |
| 1584 | Hahnemühle | Germany | Paper | |
| 1584 | Godayu Kikuya | Japan | Confectionery | |
| 1584 | Yamato Intec | Japan | Metalworking | |
| 1585 | Kiennast | Austria | Supermarket | |
| 1585 | Kikuya | Japan | Confectionery | |
| 1585 | Mercros | Japan | Retailer | |
| 1585 | Schlitzer | Germany | Distillery | |
| 1585 | Tenshoen | Japan | Tea | |
| 1586 | Matsui | Japan | Construction | |
| 1586 | Metzger | Germany | Bakery | |
| 1586 | Oyama Shaji | Japan | Construction | |
| 1587 | Chogoromochi | Japan | Confectionery | |
| 1587 | Corbiac | France | Wine | |
| 1587 | Josuian | Japan | Confectionery | |
| 1588 | Keymer Tiles | United Kingdom | Tiles | |
| 1588 | Okeka | Japan | Furnaces | |
| 1589 | Hofbräuhaus | Germany | Restaurant | |
| 1589 | Klosterbrauerei Neuzelle | Germany | Brewery | |
| 1589 | Piesers | Germany | Restaurant | |
| 1590 | Au-Hallertau | Germany | Brewery | |
| 1590 | Berenberg | Germany | Bank | |
| 1590 | Cēsu Alus | Latvia | Brewery | |
| 1590 | Sumitomo Group | Japan | Mining | |
| 1590 | Ibasen | Japan | Fans | |
| 1590 | Lana | France | Paper | |
| 1590 | Weichselbaum | Germany | Metalwork | |
| 1591 | Alte f.e. Hofapotheke | Austria | Pharmacy | |
| 1591 | Kogure | Japan | Hotel | |
| 1591 | Yamashina | Japan | Utensil | |
| 1592 | Osugiya Sobee | Japan | Confectionery | |
| 1592 | Meimon Sakai | Japan | Sake | |
| 1592 | Kikyoya | Japan | Confectionery | |
| 1592 | Nezameya | Japan | Restaurant | |
| 1593 | Koya | Japan | Sake | |
| 1593 | Yamamotoya | Japan | Seed | |
| 1594 | Specht | Germany | Restaurant | |
| 1594 | Kungyokudo | Japan | Incense | |
| 1594 | Fujinoya | Japan | Fertilizer | |
| 1595 | Alte Taverne | Germany | Restaurant | |
| 1595 | Haus zum Ritter St. Georg (Heidelberg) | Germany | Restaurant/Hotel | |
| 1596 | Chojiya | Japan | Restaurant | |
| 1596 | Ed Meier | Germany | Shoes | |
| 1596 | Osiander | Germany | Bookstore | |
| 1596 | Toshimaya | Japan | Sake | |
| 1596 | Takimo | Japan | Food | |
| 1596 | Oteramochi Kawaido | Japan | Confectionery | |
| 1596 | Tazen | Japan | Metal | |
| 1596 | Gyokurinbo | Japan | Hotel | |
| 1596–1615 | Nagata Bunshodo | Japan | Publisher | |
| 1596–1615 | Heirakuji | Japan | Publisher | |
| 1596–1615 | Hayashikan | Japan | Clothing | |
| 1597 | Gold Ochsen | Germany | Brewery | |
| 1597 | Kojima (sake company in Yonezawa, Yamagata) | Japan | Sake | |
| 1597 | Kojima (sake company in Inuyama, Aichi) | Japan | Sake | |
| 1597 | Kuwanaya | Japan | Confectionery | |
| 1597 | Uzu Kyumeigan | Japan | Pharmacy | |
| 1597 | Ryujin | Japan | Sake | |
| 1598 | Chinjukan | Japan | Pottery | |
| 1598 | Wakanoura Imoto | Japan | Pharmacy | |
| 1598 | Watahan | Japan | Construction | |
| 1598 | Nakazato Moemon | Japan | Pottery | |
| before 1599 | Minatoya Yurei-kosodate-ame | Japan | Confectionery | |
| 1599 | Grassmayr | Austria | Bells | |
| 1599 | Boun | Japan | Hotel | |
| 1599 | Kyorin | Japan | Clothing | |
| 1599 | Shichiyama Hospital | Japan | Hospital | |
| 1599 | Stämpfli | Switzerland | Publisher | |

== 1600 to 1649 ==
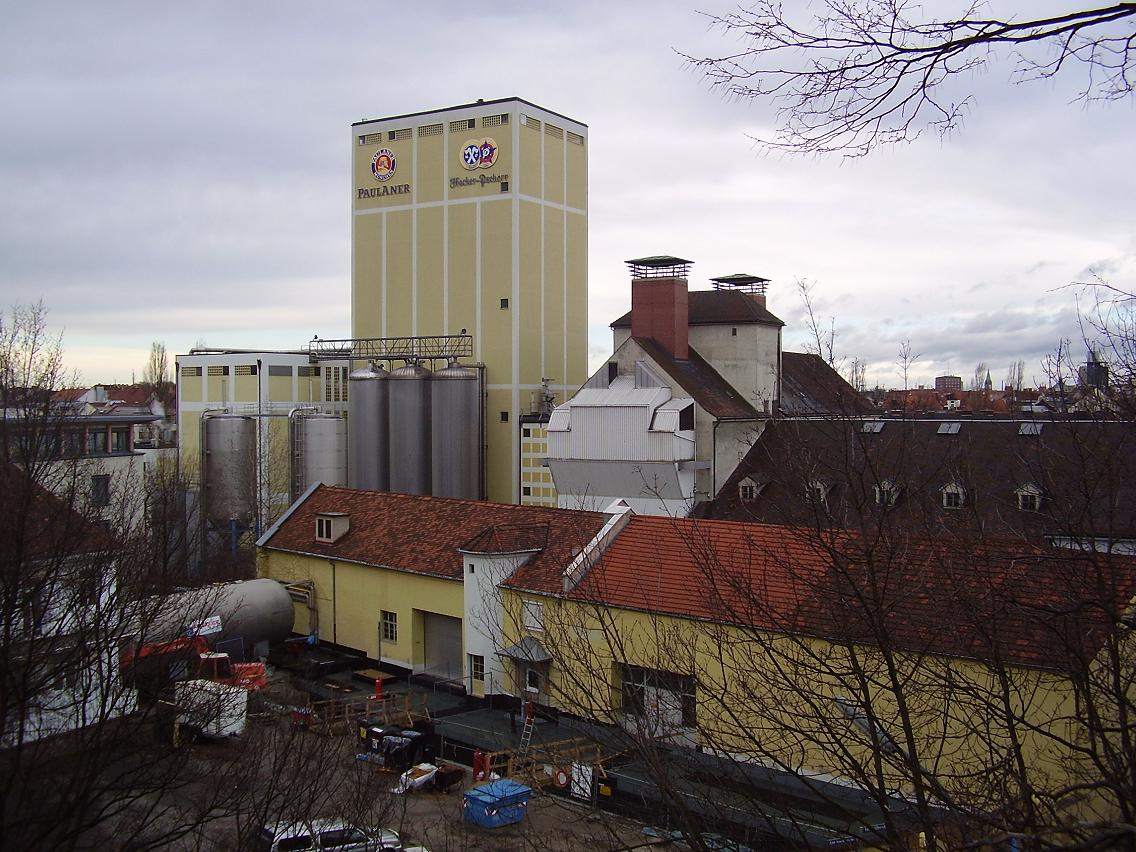
The Paulaner Brewery in Munich, Germany

| Year | Company | Current location | Field | Sources |
|---|---|---|---|---|
| 1600 | Red Lion public house, Hillingdon | United Kingdom | Hotel | |
| 1600 | Farmàcia de la Llana (Barcelona) | Spain | Pharmacy | |
| 1600 | Guangzhou Chenliji | China | Pharmaceutical | |
| 1600 | Zhimeizhai | China | Sauce | |
| 1600 | Kani | Japan | Soy sauce | |
| 1600 | Kawamata | Japan | Pharmacy | |
| 1600 | Kimura Shinzo | Japan | Clothing | |
| 1600 | Kokuya | Japan | Hotel | |
| 1601 | Shioya | Japan | Property | |
| 1601 | Okuto | Japan | Sake | |
| 1602 | Goldener Karpfen | Germany | Hotel | |
| 1602 | Brauerei Gundel | Germany | Brewery | |
| 1602 | Goto | Japan | Sake | |
| 1602 | Hozokan | Japan | Bookstore | |
| 1602 | Migita | Japan | Sake | |
| 1602 | Yomeishu | Japan | Pharmaceutical, Sake | |
| 1602 | Nakashima | Japan | Slate | |
| 1602 | Fukui Yaemon | Japan | Real estate | |
| 1603 | Chateau Auvernier | Switzerland | Wine | |
| 1603 | Hirose | Japan | Metal | |
| 1603 | Kuragi | Japan | Agricultural | |
| 1603 | Nemoto | Japan | Sake | |
| 1603 | Sato | Japan | Miso | |
| 1603 | Shobido Nagamatsu | Japan | Religious goods | |
| 1603 | Tsukasabotan | Japan | Sake | |
| 1603 | Unsuido | Japan | Confectionery | |
| 1604 | Hirsch Hotel Gehrung | Germany | Hotel | |
| circa 1604 | Ishicho | Japan | Stonemasonry | |
| 1604 | Kikuchi Hojudo | Japan | Foundry | |
| 1604 | Kameya | Japan | Pharmacy | |
| 1604 | Kadoshichi | Japan | Retailing | |
| 1604 | Yuzakikan | Japan | Hotel | |
| 1605 | Mitaniya | Japan | Clothing | |
| 1605 | Kagamiya | Japan | Retailing | |
| 1605 | Kano | Japan | Stationery | |
| 1606 | Kamakurabori Yodo | Japan | Woodwork | |
| 1607 | Leve | Germany | Restaurant | |
| 1607 | Schleppe | Austria | Brewery | |
| 1607 | Schlosswirt Zu Anif | Austria | Hotel | |
| 1607 | Alfred Blaul Hofgut Goennheim | Germany | Wine | |
| 1607 | Skultuna | Sweden | Brass and silver accessories | |
| 1607 | Sasajima | Japan | Fuel | |
| 1607 | Fushimiya | Japan | Cosmetics | |
| 1608 | Kikyoya Orii | Japan | Confectionery | |
| 1608 | Kimura | Japan | Retail | |
| 1608 | Takeda Kahei | Japan | Clothing | |
| 1608 | Komeya | Japan | Hotel | |
| 1609 | Asano Taiko | Japan | Drums | |
| 1609 | Klampfleuthner | Germany | Pottery | |
| 1609 | Kloster Ettal | Germany | Brewery | |
| 1609 | Ritterbräu | Austria | Brewery | |
| 1609 | Wolff | Austria | Wine | |
| 1609 | Apteka Rektorska | Poland | Pharmacy | |
| 1609 | Ryochikuya | Japan | Hotel | |
| before 1610 | Wookey Hole | United Kingdom | Paper | |
| 1610 | Takenaka | Japan | Construction | |
| 1610 | Honjin | Japan | Hotel | |
| 1611 | Matsuzakaya | Japan | Retailing | |
| 1611 | Miyoshi | Japan | Paper lantern | |
| 1611 | Hisaya Daikokudo | Japan | Pharmacy | |
| 1611 | Meimondo Chihara | Japan | Confectionery | |
| 1612 | Santa Maria Novella | Italy | Pharmacy / Perfumery | |
| 1613 | Mellerio | France | Jewelry | |
| 1613 | J. D. Sauerländer's | Germany | Publisher | |
| 1613 | Kikutani | Japan | Confectionery | |
| 1614 | Sumihei | Japan | Building material | |
| 1614 | Yamamoto | Japan | Construction | |
| 1614 | Kansuiro | Japan | Hotel | |
| 1615 | Akamatsu | Japan | Pharmacy | |
| 1615 | Aoki Trans | Japan | Shipping | |
| 1615 | Cartiera Mantovana | Italy | Papermaking | |
| 1615 | Eirakuya | Japan | Retailing | |
| 1615 | Furuhata | Japan | Hotel | |
| 1615 | Grolsch | Netherlands | Brewery | |
| 1615 | Hankeido | Japan | Brushes | |
| 1615 | Kimura | Japan | Sake | |
| 1615 | Komeya | Japan | Pharmacy | |
| 1615 | Maruei | Japan | Retailing | |
| 1615 | Yanagiya | Japan | Cosmetics | |
| 1615 | Anyōji | Japan | Fuel | |
| 1615 | Takagi | Japan | Sake | |
| 1615 | Kawabe | Japan | Iron works | |
| 1615 | Murata | Japan | Eyeglasses | |
| 1616 | Higeta | Japan | Soy sauce | |
| 1616 | Vopak | Netherlands | Fuel storage | |
| before 1616 | Morino | Japan | Confectionery | |
| 1616 | Wildbräu Grafing | Germany | Brewery | |
| 1616 | C. Wittmann | Germany | Brewery | |
| 1616 | Aburaya Kyusuke | Japan | Wholesale | |
| 1617 | Kameya Kiyonaga | Japan | Confectionery | |
| 1617 | Mannendo | Japan | Confectionery | |
| 1618 | Zum Schwarzen Kameel | Austria | Restaurant | |
| 1618 | Horiguchi | Japan | Sake | |
| 1618 | Hashimotoya | Japan | Restaurant | |
| 1618 | Mount of Piety | Belgium | Pawnbroking | |
| 1619 | Tengu | Japan | Jewelry | |
| 1620 | Croix D'or et Poste | Switzerland | Hotel | |
| 1620 | Spindler | Germany | Wine | |
| 1620 | Toraya | Japan | Confectionery | |
| 1620 | Naruko Kanko Hotel | Japan | Hotel | |
| 1621 | Augustiner Bräu Kloster Mülln Salzburg | Austria | Brewery | |
| 1621 | Casa de Moneda de Colombia | Colombia | Mint | |
| 1621 | Zur Letzten Instanz | Germany | Restaurant | |
| 1622 | Gessner | Germany | Brewery | |
| 1622 | Hirschen | Switzerland | Hotel | |
| 1622 | Hiya | Japan | Pharmaceutical | |
| 1623 | Hirase | Japan | Sake | |
| 1623 | Kamotsuru | Japan | Sake | |
| 1623 | Zhang Xiaoquan | China | Scissors | |
| 1623 | Avedis Zildjian | United States | Cymbals | |
| 1624 | Weingut Richard Böcking | Germany | Wine | |
| 1624 | Akashiya | Japan | Brushes | |
| 1624 | Fukusaya | Japan | Castella | |
| 1624 | Okubo Nishinochaya | Japan | Soba noodles | |
| 1624 | Karacho | Japan | Paper | |
| circa 1624 | Komaruya | Japan | Uchiwa | |
| 1624 | Marui | Japan | Cloth | |
| 1624 | Takahashi Magozaemon | Japan | Sake | |
| 1624 | Hoshino Resorts Kai Kaga | Japan | Hotel | |
| 1624 | Yoshizaki | Japan | Sake | |
| 1624 | Kato | Japan | Stone mill | |
| 1624 | Yoshinoso Yukawaya | Japan | Hotel | |
| 1624 | Takaoka Fukunobu | Japan | Confectionery | |
| 1624 | Murata Bunpuku | Japan | Confectionery | |
| 1624 | Sato | Japan | Funerary items | |
| 1624 | Awabiya | Japan | Seafood | |
| 1624 | Zum Heidenberg | Germany | Hotel | |
| 1624–1645 | Shobun | Japan | Vinegar | |
| 1624–1645 | Ota | Japan | Stonework | |
| 1624–1645 | Mimasuya | Japan | Confectionery | |
| 1624–1645 | Kawabun | Japan | Restaurant | |
| 1624–1645 | Amihiko | Japan | Restaurant | |
| 1624–1645 | Tokiwaya | Japan | Hotel | |
| 1624–1645 | Tsuboya | Japan | Confectionery | |
| 1625 | Iwanumaya | Japan | Hotel | |
| 1625 | Aogen | Japan | Miso | |
| 1625 | Fukumitsuya | Japan | Sake | |
| 1625 | Fukuzumi | Japan | Hotel | |
| 1625 | Morihachi | Japan | Confectionery | |
| 1625 | Paul Schunk | Germany | Wine | |
| 1625 | Sakura Masamune | Japan | Sake | |
| 1625 | Toa | Japan | Sake | |
| 1625 | Yagenbori | Japan | Shichimi | |
| 1625 | Masuda | Japan | Sake | |
| 1626 | Rikyuen | Japan | Tea | |
| 1625 | Morihisa Iron Studio | Japan | Ironware | |
| 1625 | Yamauchi | Japan | Religious goods | |
| 1626 | Zur Forelle | Germany | Restaurant | |
| 1626 | Minoya | Japan | Sake | |
| 1626 | Panesys | Japan | Building material | |
| 1626 | Kuroda Eiichi | Japan | Sake | |
| 1626 | Kanyoutei | Japan | Confectionery | |
| 1626 | Fujimura | Japan | Confectionery | |
| 1627 | Kotohira Kadan | Japan | Hotel | |
| 1628 | Tsukubasan Edoya | Japan | Hotel | |
| 1628 | Lammsbräu | Germany | Brewery | |
| 1628 | Schwan | Germany | Hotel | |
| 1628 | Todaya | Japan | Confectionery | |
| 1628 | Winkler | Germany | Restaurant | |
| 1628 | Yachiya | Japan | Sake | |
| 1628 | Horikiri | Japan | Construction | |
| 1629 | Augustea SpA | Italy | Shipping | |
| 1629 | Horiguchi | Japan | Construction | |
| 1629 | Tyskie | Poland | Brewery | |
| 1630 | Chidoriya | Japan | Confectionery | |
| 1630 | Graf Arco | Germany | Brewery | |
| 1630 | Ichinoyu | Japan | Hotel | |
| 1630 | Kikkoman | Japan | Foods | |
| 1630 | Wirt am Berg | Austria | Restaurant | |
| 1630 | Oi Yamamoto | Japan | Seafood | |
| 1631 | Tsunehisa | Japan | Kitchen knife | |
| 1632 | Schwechat | Austria | Brewery | |
| 1632 | Yusaya | Japan | Hotel | |
| 1632 | Zum Ochsen | Germany | Restaurant | |
| 1632 | Takasagoya Ikeuchi | Japan | Pillow | |
| 1632 | Yoshida Hideji | Japan | Tatami | |
| 1632 | Ishino | Japan | Stonemasonry | |
| 1632 | Tokumistuya | Japan | Pharmacy | |
| 1633 | Izumi Shokai | Japan | Stonework | |
| 1633 | Wakabayashi | Japan | Bag | |
| 1634 | Albrecht | Germany | Metalwork | |
| 1634 | Paulaner | Germany | Brewery | |
| 1634 | Ryoguchiya Korekiyo | Japan | Confectionery | |
| 1634 | Nagamochiya | Japan | Confectionery | |
| 1634 | Gotenmori | Japan | Hotel | |
| 1635 | Dreikönigshof | Germany | Wine | |
| 1635 | Maruyama | Japan | Woodwork | |
| 1635 | Morikawa | Japan | Sōmen noodles | |
| 1635 | Nickelhütte Aue | Germany | Nickel | |
| 1635 | Regenfuß | Germany | Nursery | |
| 1635 | Casa Batalha | Portugal | Jewellery | |
| 1635 | Okutan Kiyomizu | Japan | Restaurant | |
| 1635 | Harikichi | Japan | Fishing tackle | |
| 1636 | Maxlrainer | Germany | Brewery | |
| 1636 | Shiraishi | Japan | Wholesale | |
| 1636 | Fuyahei | Japan | Restaurant | |
| 1636 | Hatsugame | Japan | Sake | |
| 1637 | Gekkeikan | Japan | Sake | |
| 1638 | Einbecker Blaudruck | Germany | Linen | |
| 1638 | Fürst | Germany | Wine | |
| 1638 | Kizuya | Japan | Office supplies | |
| 1638 | Kopke Port | Portugal | Wine | |
| 1638 | Touwfabriek Langman | Netherlands | Rope | |
| 1638 | Tysmenytsia Fur Company | Ukraine | Textiles | |
| 1638 | Shiratamaya Shinzaburo | Japan | Confectionery | |
| 1638 | GABA | Switzerland | Health care products | |
| 1639 | Field View Farm | United States | Farm | |
| 1639 | Hugel & Fils | France | Wine | |
| 1639 | Tsuruya | Japan | Confectionery | |
| 1639 | Kyushu Toho | Japan | Medical supplies | |
| 1639 | Shimogoten | Japan | Hotel | |
| 1640 | Fromholzer | Austria | Linen | |
| 1640 | Tanaka | Japan | Sake | |
| 1640 | Kyorinkai | Japan | Hospital | |
| 1641 | Bickelmaier | Germany | Wine | |
| 1641 | Sonne | Switzerland | Hotel | |
| 1641 | Spreitzer | Germany | Wine | |
| 1642 | Bilsener Gilde | Germany | Insurance | |
| 1642 | Barker's Farm | United States | Farm | |
| 1642 | Hof Apotheke Rüdel | Germany | Pharmacy | |
| 1642 | Amako | Japan | Machinery | |
| 1642 | Kagetsu | Japan | Restaurant | |
| 1642 | Fukagawaya Mutsudaijo | Japan | Confectionery | |
| 1643 | Rudi Rüttger | Germany | Wine | |
| 1643 | Tanaka | Japan | Sake | |
| 1643 | Sasaki | Japan | Seal | |
| 1643 | Trudon | France | Wax, candles | |
| 1644 | Bucher | Germany | Brewery | |
| 1644 | Stockholm | Germany | Hotel | |
| 1644 | Tsukioka | Japan | Hotel | |
| 1645 | Daishin | Japan | Hotel | |
| 1645 | Hatchomiso | Japan | Miso | |
| 1645 | Post-och Inrikes Tidningar | Sweden | Newspaper | |
| 1645 | Ritter | Germany | Brewery | |
| 1645 | Shohokuen | Japan | Tea | |
| 1645 | Shoutoku | Japan | Sake | |
| 1645 | Yamasa | Japan | Soy sauce | |
| 1645 | Kaku | Japan | Farming material | |
| 1646 | Bofors | Sweden | Defense | |
| 1647 | Chivite | Spain | Wine | |
| 1648 | Kojima | Japan | Paper | |
| 1648 | Fujiya | Japan | Wedding hall | |
| 1648 | Oji Ogiya | Japan | Restaurant | |
| 1649 | Bischofshof | Germany | Brewery | |
| 1649 | Falter | Germany | Brewery | |
| 1649 | Fiskars | Finland | Blades | |
| 1649 | Marukan | Japan | Vinegar | |
| 1649 | Trautwein | Germany | Wine | |
| 1649 | Tanaka | Japan | Safe | |

== 1650 to 1699 ==
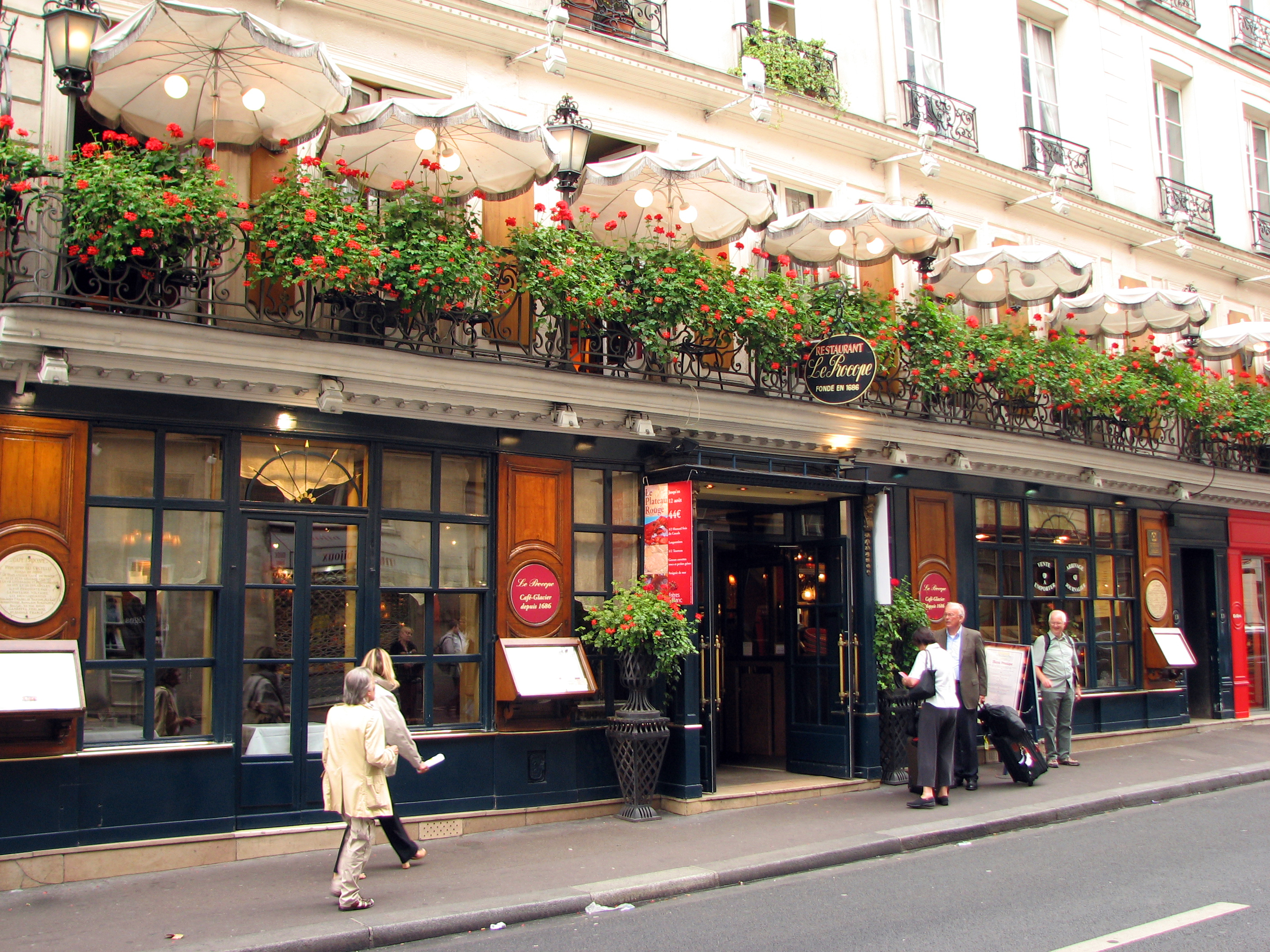
Café Procope is called the oldest restaurant of Paris in continuous operation. It was opened in 1686 by the Sicilian chef Francesco Procopio dei Coltelli.

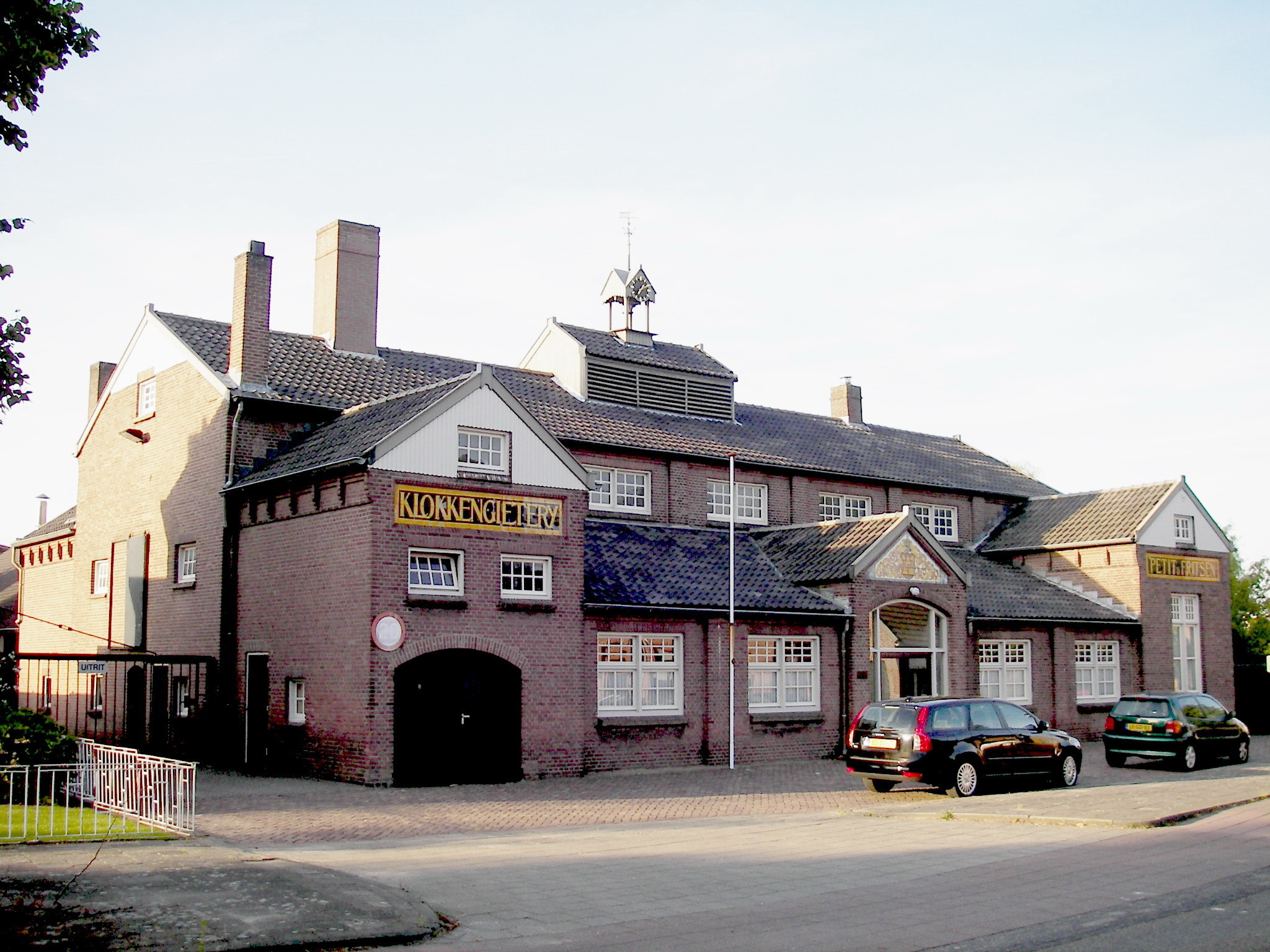
Petit & Fritsen (Koninklijke Klokkengieterij Petit & Fritsen b.v.) is a foundry located at Aarle-Rixtel, Netherlands that dates back to 1660.

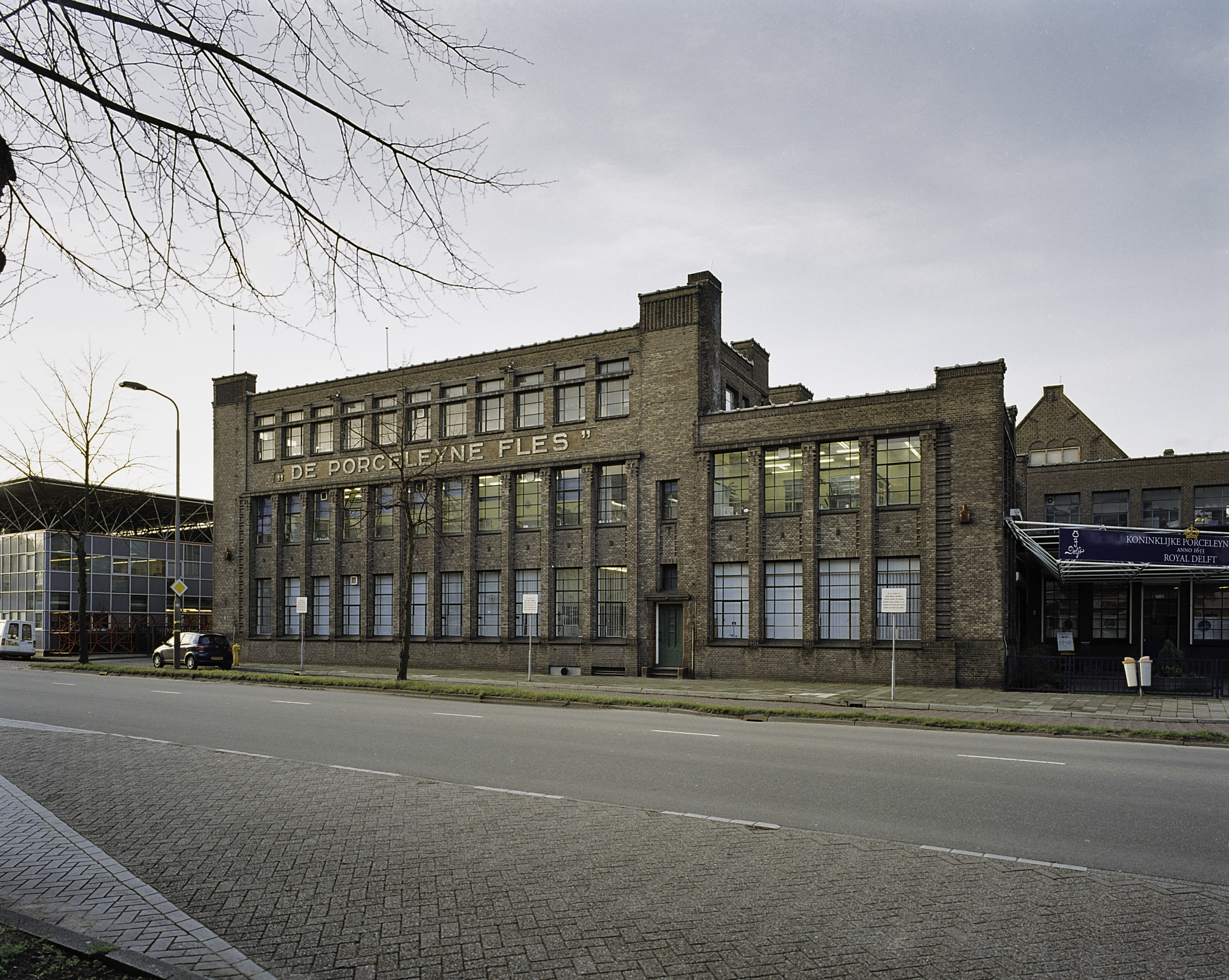
The Royal Delft (De Koninklijke Porceleyne Fles) building is a designated rijksmonument in the Netherlands. It is the only remaining factory of the 32 earthenware factories that were established in Delft during the 17th century.

| Year | Company | Current location | Field | Sources |
|---|---|---|---|---|
| 1608 | Bushmills Distillery | United Kingdom | Irish Whiskey | |
| 1650 | Aannemers- en Timmerbedrijf Roozemond | Netherlands | Construction | |
| 1650 | Yukawa | Japan | Sake | |
| 1650 | Schlossbrauerei Autenrieder | Germany | Brewery | |
| 1650 | Fachwerk 33 | Germany | Restaurant | |
| 1650 | Kaganoi | Japan | Sake | |
| 1650 | Post Brauerei Weiler | Germany | Brewery | |
| 1650 | Yukawa | Japan | Sake | |
| 1650 | Koshuya | Japan | Dolls | |
| 1650 | Ebisuya | Japan | Hotel | |
| 1650 | Jiuzhitang | China | Pharmacy | |
| 1650 | Otowaya Shinise | Japan | Confectionery | |
| 1651 | Emmerich | Germany | Wine | |
| 1651 | Lauterbacher | Germany | Brewery | |
| 1651 | Wangmazi | China | Scissors | |
| 1652 | Brückenkeller | Germany | Restaurant | |
| 1652 | KnaapenGroep | Netherlands | Construction | |
| 1652 | Bussho | Japan | Religious goods | |
| 1652 | Mabuchi | Japan | Clothing | |
| 1652 | Ichimaru | Japan | Clothing | |
| 1652-1655 | Matsuya Tokiwa | Japan | Confectionery | |
| 1653 | Ozu | Japan | Paper | |
| 1653 | Royal Delft | Netherlands | Porcelain | |
| 1653 | Sushiman | Japan | Restaurant | |
| 1653 | Totsuka | Japan | Sake | |
| 1654 | Faust | Germany | Brewery | |
| 1654 | Akoya | Japan | Clothing | |
| 1655 | Emery Farm | United States | Farm | |
| 1655 | Firmin | United Kingdom | Beltmaker | |
| 1655 | Tanaka | Japan | Sake | |
| 1655 | Tobaya | Japan | Strings | |
| 1655 | Ota | Japan | Retailing | |
| 1655 | Zanini | Italy | Wrought iron | |
| 1655-1658 | Shichimiya | Japan | Spice | |
| 1656 | Au Bijou | Switzerland | Jewelry | |
| 1656 | Haarlems Dagblad | Netherlands | Newspaper | |
| 1656 | Kasen | Japan | Kiln | |
| 1656 | Kogatanaya | Japan | Dolls | |
| 1657 | Baieido | Japan | Incense | |
| 1657 | Everlth | Japan | Pharmaceutical | |
| 1657 | Hirschbräu | Germany | Brewery | |
| 1657 | Kitagawa Honke | Japan | Sake | |
| 1657 | Nakayama Doll | Japan | Dolls | |
| 1657 | Ulefos Jernværk | Norway | Foundry | |
| 1657 | Toraya | Japan | Confectionery | |
| 1657 | Uemura Yoshitsugu | Japan | Confectionery | |
| 1657 | Kamigoten | Japan | Hotel | |
| 1657 | Cham Paper Group | Switzerland | Paper | |
| 1658 | Arikawa | Japan | Pharmaceutical | |
| 1658 | Gaststätte Röhrl | Germany | Restaurant | |
| 1658 | Hirai | Japan | Sake | |
| 1658 | Nishino Kinryo | Japan | Chemicals | |
| 1658 | Ohki | Japan | Pharmaceutical | |
| 1658 | Shuzui | Japan | Scales | |
| 1658 | Kamadaya | Japan | Hotel | |
| 1659 | Asadaya | Japan | Hotel | |
| 1659 | Asadaya Ihei | Japan | Restaurant | |
| 1659 | Harise | Japan | Restaurant | |
| 1659 | Hinoki | Japan | Printing | |
| 1659 | Kagiya | Japan | Fireworks | |
| 1659 | Kiku Masamune | Japan | Sake | |
| 1659 | Mochibun | Japan | Confectionery | |
| 1659 | Okamaya | Japan | Metal | |
| 1659 | Somaya | Japan | Stationery | |
| 1659 | Tsuchiya | Japan | Paper lanterns | |
| 1660 | Chimatsushima | Japan | Hotel | |
| 1660 | Petit & Fritsen | Netherlands | Foundry | |
| 1660 | Maison Germain Soieries et Papiers peints | France | Tissues & Wallpapers | |
| 1661 | Asaka | Japan | Tools | |
| 1661 | Ejima | Japan | Tea | |
| 1661 | Inoueki | Japan | Chemicals | |
| 1661 | Kameya Sakyo | Japan | Chinese medicine | |
| 1661 | Schilz | Germany | Ceramics | |
| 1661 | Selbach | Germany | Wine | |
| 1661 | Uchigasaki | Japan | Sake | |
| 1661 | Zohiko | Japan | Lacquerware | |
| 1661-1673 | Tago Honke | Japan | Sake | |
| 1661-1673 | Otokoyama | Japan | Sake | |
| 1662 | Matsuzakaya | Japan | Hotel | |
| 1662 | Miyasaka | Japan | Miso | |
| 1662 | Moririn | Japan | Cloth | |
| 1662 | Rössle | Germany | Hotel | |
| 1662 | Hotel Wesseling | Netherlands | Hotel | |
| 1662 | Tatsuuma Honke | Japan | Sake | |
| 1662 | Usui | Japan | Retailing | |
| 1662 | Van Eeghen | Netherlands | Foods | |
| 1662 | Yanagiya | Japan | Tea | |
| 1663 | Bärenwirt | Austria | Restaurant | |
| 1663 | Hirsch | Germany | Pharmacy | |
| 1663 | Hofmann | Germany | Brewery | |
| 1663 | Ihan | Japan | Tatami | |
| 1663 | Krawany | Austria | Retailing | |
| 1663 | Kyukyodo | Japan | Pharmacy, paper goods, incense | |
| 1663 | Matsumoto | Japan | Chemicals | |
| 1663 | Moriroku | Japan | Chemicals | |
| 1663 | Shimakawa | Japan | Confectionery | |
| 1663 | Vitale Barberis Canonico | Italy | Wool fabrics | |
| 1663 | Hauert | Switzerland | Fertilizer | |
| 1663 | Correios | Brazil | Post | |
| 1664 | Daisan | Japan | Real estate | |
| 1664 | Gazzetta di Mantova | Italy | Newspaper | |
| 1664 | Old Holland | Netherlands | Oil Paints | |
| 1664 | Schwarze & Schlichte | Germany | Distillery | |
| 1665 | Gubernija | Lithuania | Brewery | |
| 1665 | London Gazette | United Kingdom | Newspaper | |
| 1665 | Morita | Japan | Brewery | |
| 1665 | Okazaki | Japan | Sake | |
| 1665 | Saint-Gobain | France | Conglomerate | |
| 1666 | Robert Noble | United Kingdom | Textiles | |
| 1666 | Sato | Japan | Supermarket | |
| 1666 | Spink | United Kingdom | Numismatic auctions | |
| 1666 | Wieninger | Germany | Brewery | |
| 1666 | Yaegaki | Japan | Sake | |
| 1666 | Yuasa Trading | Japan | Trade | |
| 1666 | Bankaku | Japan | Confectionery | |
| 1667 | Seaside Inn | United States | Hotel | |
| 1668 | Merck KGaA | Germany | Pharmaceutical | |
| 1668 | Engelbräu | Germany | Brewery | |
| 1668 | Mitsui | Japan | Sake | |
| 1669 | Iseya | Japan | Hotel | |
| 1669 | Okaya | Japan | Trade | |
| 1669 | Tong Ren Tang | China | Pharmacy | |
| 1669 | Wangzhihe | China | Condiments | |
| 1669 | Zum Adler Breisach | Germany | Restaurant | |
| 1669 | Zum Kreuz | Switzerland | Hotel | |
| 1669 | Akahoshi | Japan | Metalware | |
| 1670 | El Rinconcillo | Spain | Restaurant | |
| 1670 | Fowlers of Earlswood | United Kingdom | Cheese | |
| 1670 | J. Herbin | France | Sealing wax and ink | |
| 1672 | Hoares Bank | United Kingdom | Bank | |
| 1672 | Kikuya | Japan | Stationery | |
| 1672 | Tucher Bräu | Germany | Brewery | |
| 1672 | Rongbaozhai | China | Stationery | |
| 1673 | Daiichi | Japan | Cloth | |
| 1673 | Genpei | Japan | Sake | |
| 1673 | Goldenes Kreuz | Austria | Hotel | |
| 1673 | Inata | Japan | Sake | |
| 1673 | Jinjudo | Japan | Incense | |
| 1673 | Kawashima | Japan | Paper | |
| 1673 | Kawasho | Japan | Paper | |
| 1673 | Mitsukoshi | Japan | Retailing | |
| 1673 | Oga | Japan | Sake | |
| 1673 | Tamagawa | Japan | Sake | |
| 1673 | Tamanohikari | Japan | Sake | |
| 1673 | Zillinger | Austria | Wine | |
| 1673 | Yamada | Japan | Restaurant | |
| 1673 | Matsuya Riemon | Japan | Confectionery | |
| 1673 | Ebiya | Japan | Antique | |
| 1673-1681 | Kojimaya | Japan | Confectionery | |
| 1673-1681 | Terada Honke | Japan | Sake | |
| 1674 | Miki | Japan | Chemicals | |
| 1674 | Sabatti | Italy | Firearms | |
| 1674 | Stockholms Auktionsverk | Sweden | Auctions | |
| 1674 | Metzler Bank | Germany | Bank | |
| 1674 | Myogaya | Japan | Hotel | |
| 1674 | Sukyu | Japan | Miso | |
| 1675 | Adams Gasthof | Germany | Restaurant | |
| 1675 | Egger | Austria | Brewery | |
| 1675 | Hakubotan | Japan | Sake | |
| 1675 | Hartmann | Germany | Hotel | |
| 1675 | Masuda Tokubee | Japan | Sake | |
| 1675 | Matsudaya | Japan | Hotel | |
| 1675 | Mornflake | United Kingdom | Foods | |
| 1675 | Romanushof | Germany | Wine | |
| 1675 | Shuetsu | Japan | Foods | |
| 1675 | Sugimoto Kichijuro | Japan | Tools | |
| 1675 | Takahashi | Japan | Stonemasonry | |
| 1675 | Takanoya | Japan | Karasumi | |
| 1675 | Tamazawa | Japan | Confectionery | |
| 1675 | Tiefenbrunner | Italy | Wine | |
| 1675 | Weihenstephan | Germany | Brewery | |
| 1675 | Fujiwara | Japan | Oil | |
| 1676 | Hamburger Feuerkasse | Germany | Insurance | |
| 1676 | Hiroroku | Japan | Foods | |
| 1676 | James Lock & Co. | United Kingdom | Hats | |
| 1676 | Konishi Mankintan | Japan | Pharmacy | |
| 1677 | Yamahiko | Japan | Construction | |
| 1677 | Yamamoto Honke | Japan | Sake | |
| 1677 | Zur Linde | Germany | Restaurant | |
| 1678 | Olmo Antico | Italy | Wine | |
| 1678 | Tesdorpf GmbH | Germany | Wine | |
| 1678 | Mitsubishi Tanabe Pharma | Japan | Pharmacy | |
| 1679 | Eichbaum | Germany | Brewery | |
| 1679 | Eigashima | Japan | Sake | |
| 1679 | Schwarz | Austria | Mouth harps | |
| 1679 | Viellard Migeon & Cie | France | Foundry | |
| 1680 | Comédie-Française | France | Theatre | |
| 1680 | Saunderskill | United States | Farm | |
| 1680 | Simonis | Belgium | Cloth | |
| 1680 | Tenryo | Japan | Sake | |
| 1680 | Yoshibun | Japan | Fish | |
| 1680 | Morita Jihee | Japan | Pharmacy | |
| 1680 | Boon Brewery | Belgium | Brewery | |
| 1681 | Chikumanishiki | Japan | Sake | |
| 1681 | Eggenberg | Austria | Brewery | |
| 1681 | Göteborgs Auktionsverk | Sweden | Auctions | |
| 1681 | JeanRichard | Switzerland | Watches | |
| 1681 | Les Trois Rois | Switzerland | Hotel | |
| 1681 | Naraya | Japan | Construction | |
| 1681 | Hotel zum Ritter St. Georg | Germany | Hotel | |
| 1681 | Shooken | Japan | Castella | |
| 1682 | Sawaya | Japan | Confectionery | |
| 1682 | Ishiichi | Japan | Stonework | |
| 1683 | Brill | Netherlands | Publisher | |
| 1683 | Gaggenau | Germany | Appliances | |
| 1683 | Yasuda Nenju | Japan | Prayer beads | |
| 1683 | Hof-Apotheke (Kempten) | Germany | Pharmacy | |
| 1684 | De Dietrich | France | Equipment for the pharmaceutical and chemical industries | |
| 1684 | Mieman Nishimura | Japan | Soy sauce | |
| 1684 | Niiya | Japan | Herbs | |
| 1684 | Yoshiyo | Japan | Catering equipment | |
| 1684 | Urokoya | Japan | Confectionary | |
| 1685 | Carl Loebner | Germany | Toyshop | |
| 1685 | Heimes | Germany | Restaurant | |
| 1685 | Tomikyu | Japan | Paper | |
| 1685 | SFCO | France | Trading | |
| 1686 | Café Procope | France | Restaurant | |
| 1686 | Nakaura | Japan | Foods | |
| 1687 | Mihoharaya | Japan | Housewares | |
| 1687 | Tarlant | France | Wine | |
| 1687 | Kimuraya | Japan | Hotel | |
| 1688 | Aburaya | Japan | Hotel | |
| 1688 | Chikuma Miso | Japan | Miso | |
| 1688 | Fukuda | Japan | Sake | |
| 1688 | Fukuroju | Japan | Sake | |
| 1688 | Harry | Germany | Bakery | |
| 1688 | Kadojin | Japan | Hotel | |
| 1688 | Kaishin | Japan | Foods | |
| 1688 | Kanmo | Japan | Hanpen | |
| 1688 | Katsuyama | Japan | Foods | |
| 1688 | Kesselring | Germany | Brewery | |
| 1688 | Kobu | Japan | Sake | |
| 1688 | Lambertz | Germany | Chocolate | |
| 1688 | Lloyd's of London | United Kingdom | Insurance | |
| 1688 | Madonoume | Japan | Sake | |
| 1688 | Shibanuma | Japan | Soy sauce | |
| 1688 | Tatebayashi | Japan | Architecture | |
| 1688 | Tsuda Magobee | Japan | Foods | |
| 1688 | Yasuimoku | Japan | Construction | |
| 1688 | Shimizu | Japan | Pharmacy | |
| 1688 | Kikkona | Japan | Soy sauce | |
| 1688 | Moriyama | Japan | Sake | |
| 1688 | Kajimasa | Japan | Metalware | |
| 1688 | Sakuragi Fusajiro | Japan | Retail | |
| 1688 | Nishikawaya | Japan | Confectionery | |
| 1688 | Muromachi | Japan | Sake | |
| 1688 | Yaogen | Japan | Confectionery | |
| 1688 | Yutouya | Japan | Hotel | |
| 1689 | Aiba | Japan | Fans | |
| 1689 | Amekaze | Japan | Soy sauce | |
| 1689 | Ede & Ravenscroft | United Kingdom | Clothing | |
| 1689 | Fukushima | Japan | Pawnbroker | |
| 1689 | Hanbee Fu | Japan | Foods | |
| 1689 | Hinomaru | Japan | Sake | |
| 1689 | Husqvarna AB | Sweden | Conglomerate | |
| 1689 | Kojiya | Japan | Miso | |
| 1689 | Kuroeya | Japan | Lacquerware | |
| 1689 | Marukichi | Japan | Oil | |
| 1689 | Nabedana | Japan | Sake | |
| 1689 | Nagano | Japan | Sake | |
| 1689 | Shogoin Yatsuhashi | Japan | Confectionery | |
| 1689 | Nishio | Japan | Confectionery | |
| 1689 | Suzuki Shuzōten | Japan | Sake | |
| 1689 | Ishikawa Kinjiro | Japan | Dried goods | |
| 1689 | Nishino | Japan | Taiko drum | |
| 1689 | Osawa | Japan | Sake | |
| 1689 | Maruta Nakajima | Japan | Pharmacy | |
| 1690 | Barclays | United Kingdom | Bank | |
| 1690 | Delamare & Co. | France | Optics | |
| 1690 | Genroku Tatami | Japan | Tatami | |
| 1690 | J B Joyce | United Kingdom | Clocks | |
| 1690 | Hichifuku | Japan | Pharmaceutical | |
| 1690 | Makino | Japan | Sake | |
| 1690 | Maruishi | Japan | Sake | |
| 1690 | Tokyo Matsuya | Japan | Paper | |
| 1690 | Monjuso | Japan | Hotel | |
| 1690 | Okabun | Japan | Cloth | |
| 1690 | Tanbaya | Japan | Fashion | |
| 1690 | Towle Silversmiths | United States | Silversmith | |
| 1690 | Tsujikura | Japan | Umbrellas | |
| 1690 | Yamamotoyama | Japan | Tea | |
| 1690 | Amehata | Japan | Inkstone | |
| 1691 | Awaya | Japan | Cloth | |
| 1691 | Imai | Japan | Sake | |
| 1691 | Itokichi | Japan | Cloth | |
| 1691 | Nolet Jeneverstokerij-Distilleerderij | Netherlands | Distillery | |
| 1691 | Sasanoyuki | Japan | Tofu | |
| 1691 | Sekizenkan | Japan | Hotel | |
| 1691 | Valentin Zusslin | France | Wine | |
| 1691 | Omaru | Japan | Hotel | |
| 1691 | Ameya Kawai | Japan | Confectionery | |
| 1692 | Coutts | United Kingdom | Bank | |
| 1692 | Ekelund | Sweden | Cloth | |
| 1692 | Taylor's | Portugal | Wine | |
| 1692 | Izutsuya | Japan | Noodles | |
| 1692 | Yuuki | Japan | Sake | |
| 1693 | Suzutame | Japan | Dolls | |
| 1693 | Ishino | Japan | Slate | |
| 1694 | Shimadaya | Japan | Farm | |
| 1694 | Schuler St. Jakobskellerei | Switzerland | Wine | |
| 1694 | Bank of England | United Kingdom | Bank | |
| 1695 | Bank of Scotland | United Kingdom | Bank | |
| 1694 | Casa da Moeda do Brasil | Brazil | Mint | |
| 1695 | DeKuyper | Netherlands | Distillery | |
| 1695 | Furutakiya | Japan | Hotel | |
| 1695 | Kumagaiya | Japan | Confectionery | |
| 1695 | Niki | Japan | Sake | |
| 1695 | Oiwake Yokan | Japan | Yōkan | |
| 1695 | Suzuki Bussan | Japan | Foods | |
| circa 1695 | Taruhei | Japan | Sake | |
| 1695 | Yumoto | Japan | Hotel | |
| 1695 | Uenoya | Japan | Hotel | |
| 1696 | Kagiya Masaaki | Japan | Confectionery | |
| 1696 | Kitajima | Japan | Confectionery | |
| 1696 | C. de Koning Tilly | Netherlands | Pharmacy | |
| 1697 | Folkes | United Kingdom | Foundry | |
| 1697 | Hakukoma | Japan | Sake | |
| 1697 | Old Moore's Almanack | United Kingdom | Almanac | |
| 1697 | Ono | Japan | Sake | |
| 1697 | Schwanen | Germany | Restaurant | |
| 1698 | Berry Brothers and Rudd | United Kingdom | Wine | |
| 1698 | Am Knipp | Germany | Restaurant | |
| 1698 | Kössel | Germany | Brewery | |
| 1698 | Shepherd Neame | United Kingdom | Brewery | |
| 1698 | Silvera | Netherlands | Fabric | |
| 1698 | Wakaeya | Japan | Restaurant | |
| 1699 | Akaoya | Japan | Pickles | |
| 1699 | Ninben | Japan | Foods | |
| 1699 | Osoumenya | Japan | Confectionery | |
| 1699 | Wakatakeya | Japan | Sake | |

== See also ==
- Category:Companies by year of establishment
- List of oldest banks in continuous operation
- List of oldest companies in Australia
- List of oldest companies in India
- List of oldest companies in the United States
- List of oldest institutions in continuous operation
- List of oldest restaurants in South Korea
- Henokiens
- Lindy effect
- Livery company
