= Gastagwirt =

Historic landgasthof in Austria

- Native name: Gastagwirt GmbH & Co KG
- Industry: Hotel
- Founded: 1380
- Headquarters: Alte Wiener Straße 37, A-5301 Eugendorf, Salzburg (state), Austria
- Key people: Maislinger and Kaufmann families
- Website: gastagwirt.at/en/

Gastagwirt is one of the oldest Austrian inns ("landgasthof") founded in 1380 and located in Eugendorf village, Austria.

Recently it was completely modernized and is used by tourist groups also from nearby Salzburg.

== See also ==
- List of oldest companies
