= Hotel Interlaken =

Swiss hotel

- Industry: Hotel
- Founded: 1323; 703 years ago
- Headquarters: Höheweg 74, CH-3800 Interlaken, Switzerland
- Key people: Georges Beutler (director)
- Website: hotelinterlaken.ch

Hotel Interlaken is one of the oldest hotels in Switzerland. It opened in 1323 and was originally used as a guest house of the cloister and later it was part of the administration of the region. The old court room on the first floor of the Hotel is now used as a meeting room.

The hotel is in historic Interlaken town and was visited by many celebrities including composer Felix Mendelssohn and Lord Byron.

== See also ==
- List of oldest companies
