= Zum Stachel =

- Native name: Main-Gastro GmbH
- Industry: Restaurant
- Founded: 1413
- Headquarters: Gressengasse 1, 97070 Würzburg, Germany
- Key people: Rolf Schulz (managing director)
- Website: www.weinhaus-stachel.de

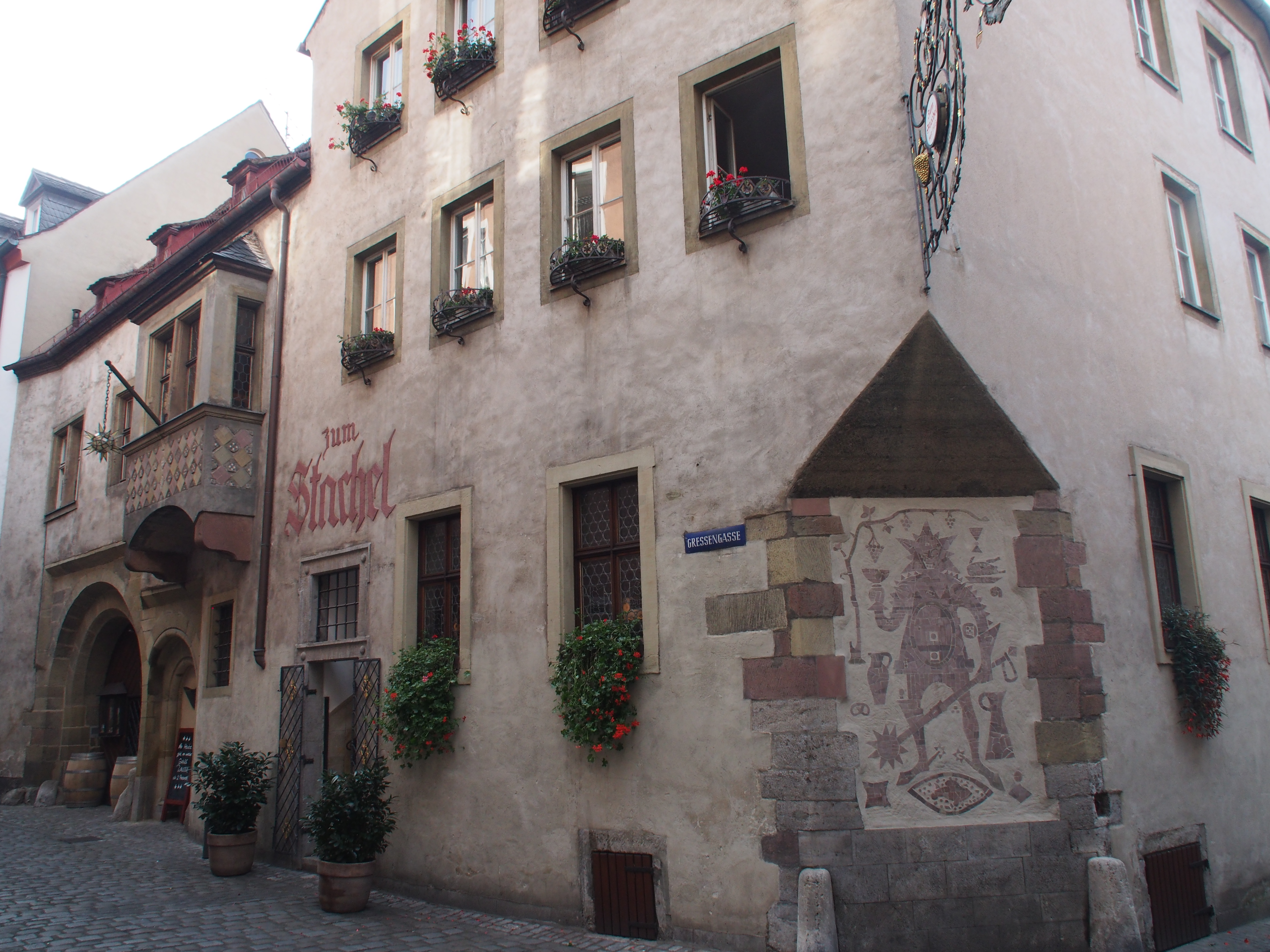
Gasthaus Zum Stachel

Zum Stachel is one of the oldest German inns located in Würzburg, Franconia, Bavaria. In 1413 the butcher Hanns Rehlein and his wife and landlady Margarete bought the "Gressenhof" for 200 guldens and founded a gastronomic tradition.

In the summer visitors can use a vine-draped outdoor courtyard, where are served wines from the restaurant's own vineyards.

== See also ==
- List of oldest companies
