= Zum Goldenen Anker =

- Industry: Hotel
- Founded: 1439
- Headquarters: Große Burgstrasse 9, 23552 Lübeck, Germany
- Website: www.luebeckaltstadthotel.de

Zum Goldenen Anker is the oldest hotel in Lübeck, Germany founded in 1439. The building has a historic heavy wooden door and the legend says there is still a study room of Pope Pius XII.

== See also ==
- List of oldest companies
