= Hotel Stein =

Hotel in Salzburg, Austria

- Industry: Hotel
- Founded: 1399
- Headquarters: Giselakai 3-5, 5020 Salzburg, Austria
- Website: www.hotelstein.at/en.html

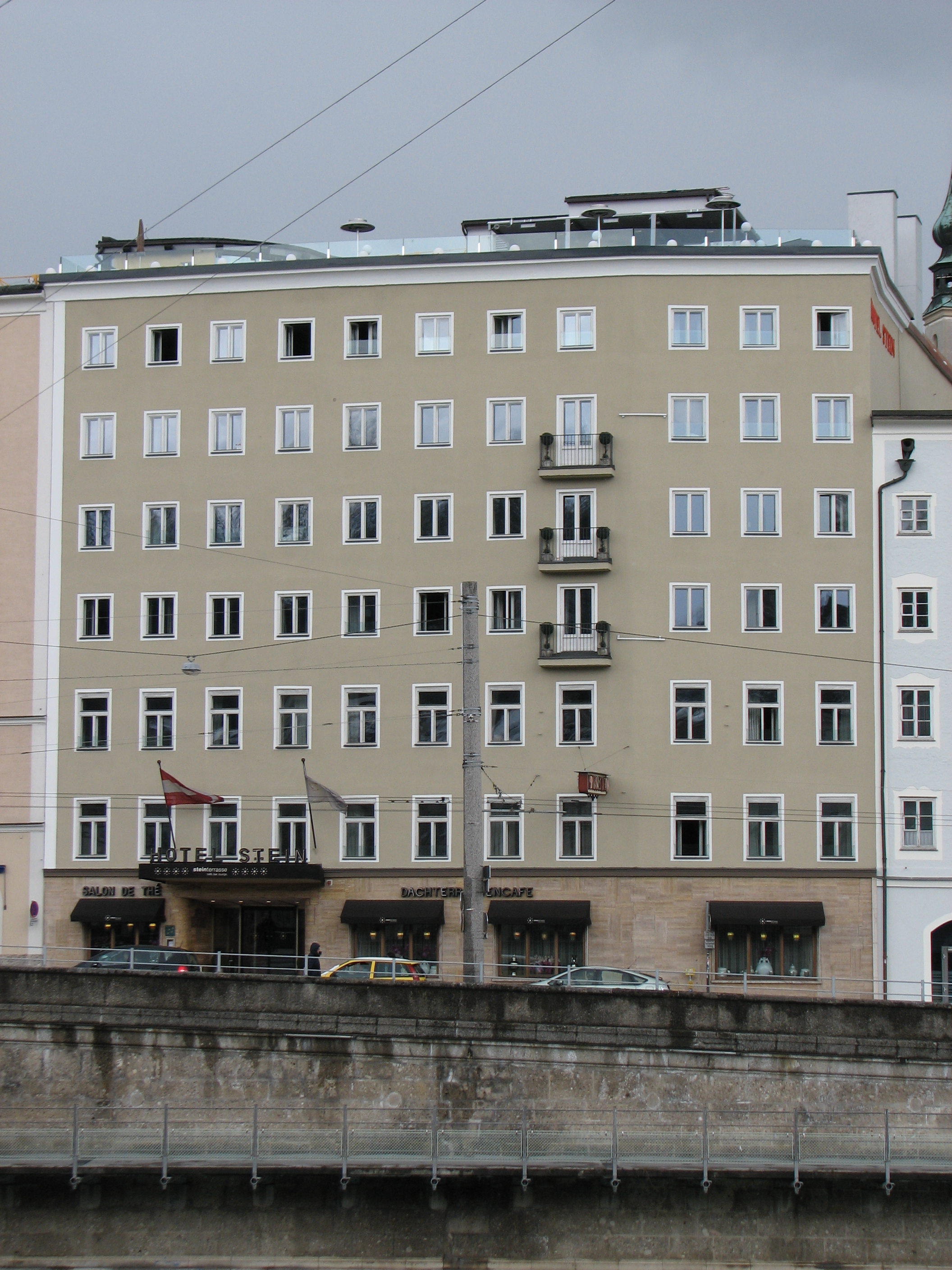
Hotel Stein

Hotel Stein is the oldest hotel in Salzburg, Austria founded in 1399.

In 2001 the businessman Haythem Al Wazzan bought the hotel and made the complete renovation. Salzburg architects Michael Strobl and Christian Prasser planned the general renovation made in 2016 and in 2017 the hotel reopened as a 4-star one.

== See also ==
- List of oldest companies
