= Café Vlissinghe =

Oldest continuously running café in Bruges, Belgium

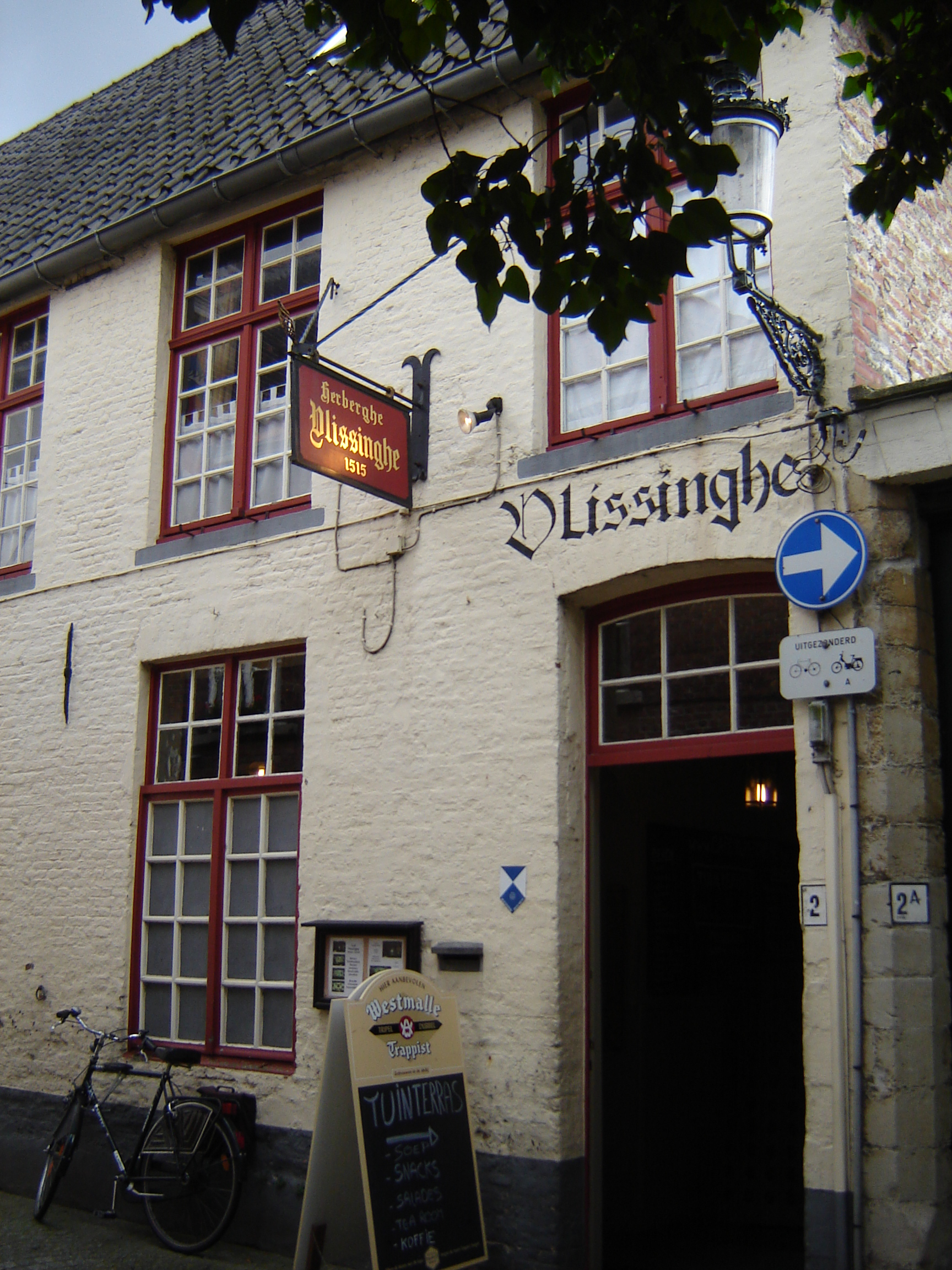
- Industry: Restaurant
- Founded: 1515
- Headquarters: Blekersstraat 2, 8000 Bruges, Belgium
- Website: www.cafevlissinghe.be

Café Vlissinghe is the oldest continuously running café in Bruges, the first written record about it is from 1515.

== History ==
The café consists of two joined houses from the late 15th century. Due to renovations and rebuilding, including replacement of the wooden facade with the stone, the current structure is largely from the 17th century.

== Flemish café ==
The modern history of Vlissinghe begins in 1855, when it was bought by Jacques De Meulemeester, who owned the brewery De Arend (later Aigle Belgica) in the immediate vicinity of the café. His son Leon managed the brewery from 1869 and Vlissinghe was reconstructed and to the taproom was installed a black marble fireplace. Newly created neo-baroque furniture, old arts and paintings created an "old Flemish" interior that not only fits well into the historic building, but also attracts lovers of art in Bruges.

In the café are also headquarters of various associations who meet regularly and favorably affect sales, for example Art Genegen, an association founded in 1894 by teachers and students of the Academy of Fine Arts. Leon De Meulemeester enabled even creating a separate room in a side wing, decorated to your own taste. The meeting room, that is referred by the makers of artful decor, still exists and is a small museum.

== See also ==
- List of oldest companies
