= Au Bijou =

- Native name: Au Bijou GmbH
- Industry: Jewellery
- Founded: 1656
- Headquarters: Rüdengasse 3, 4001 Basel, Switzerland
- Website: www.aubijoubasel.ch

Au Bijou (Au Bijou GmbH Uhren & Schmuck) is the oldest jewellery in Basel, Switzerland, the Huber family business now in its 11th generation. In 1656, the goldsmith Martin Huber founded the company producing bijou, jewellery included in articles of clothing. Today, Patrik-Philipp Huber continues in the tradition and manufactures his own jewellery.

== See also ==
- List of oldest companies
