= Kichijiya =

- Native name: 株式会社 吉字屋本店
- Industry: Oil
- Founded: 1568
- Headquarters: 4-5-29 Central Kofu, 400 - 0032 Kofu, Yamanashi, Japan
- Key people: Takano Sonobu Yomon (director)
- Website: www.kichijiya.jp

Kichijiya is a Japanese traditional oil company in Kofu City, Yamanashi Prefecture founded in 1568.

Products and services:

- petroleum products
- industrial lubricants
- wholesale and retail trade of LPG
- sales of food oil
- sales of Italian foodstuffs
- recruitment agency work of life insurance
- solar photovoltaic system proposal sales
- automobile maintenance and vehicle inspection etc.

== See also ==
- List of oldest companies
