= Hotel Krone, Solothurn =

Swiss hotel in Solothurn, since 1418

- Industry: Hotel
- Founded: 1418
- Headquarters: Hauptgasse 64, 4500 Solothurn, Switzerland
- Website: www.lacouronne-solothurn.ch/en

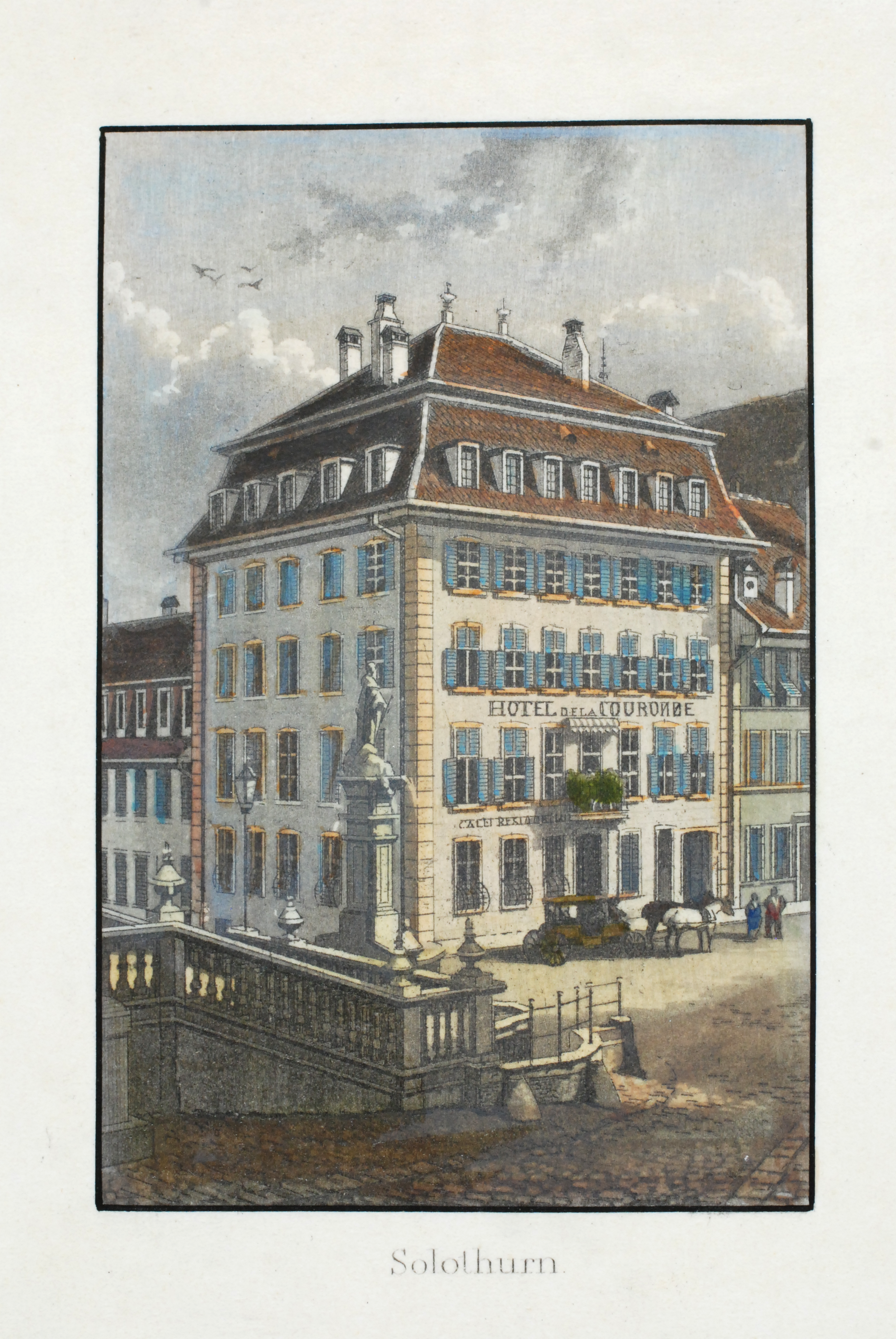
Hotel Krone in Solothurn, painting from 1840-1850

Hotel Krone is the oldest hotel in Solothurn town, Switzerland founded in 1418. The rooms are decorated with authentic Louis XV or Biedermeier furniture and equipped with minibars and work desks.

During its history it hosted many famous people, including Casanova, Napoleon, Sophia Loren, Henry Kissinger and José Carreras.

== Renovation ==
The 4-star boutique hotel La Couronne reopened on 2 May 2017 after extensive renovations. All modernization work was completed in autumn of 2017 with the addition of the garage on Seilergasse and 9 additional atelier rooms in the dependence building. In August 2017, the hotel joined Swiss Historic Hotels and the restaurant was awarded 13 Gault Millau points.

== See also ==
- List of oldest companies
