= Thorbräu =

Brewery in Augsburg, Bavaria, Germany

- Founded: 1582; 444 years ago
- Headquarters: Augsburg, Bavaria, Germany
- Website: thorbraeu.de

Thorbräu is one of the oldest breweries in Germany, founded in 1582 in Augsburg, Bavaria. Their beer is brewed in a specific standard that is not a part of the Reinheitsgebot, but of Augsburg's own beer purity laws that have been set since 1516, explaining that no version of beer can be brewed using inferior ingredients resulting in an inferior beer.

The more than 400-year-old brewery is located on the edge of Augsburg's old town at Wertachbrucker Tor. As one of the main proprietors of the regularly held Wertachbruckerthorfest, Thorbräu continues an Augsburg tradition. The brewery itself is a roughly thirty minute travel to Munich.
