= Kikutani =

Kikutani (written: 菊谷) is a Japanese surname. Notable people with the surname include:

- Takashi Kikutani (菊谷 崇, born 1980), Japanese rugby union player
- Tazuko Kikutani (菊谷 多鶴子, born 1947), Japanese swimmer
