= Shinise =

Long-established businesses in Japan

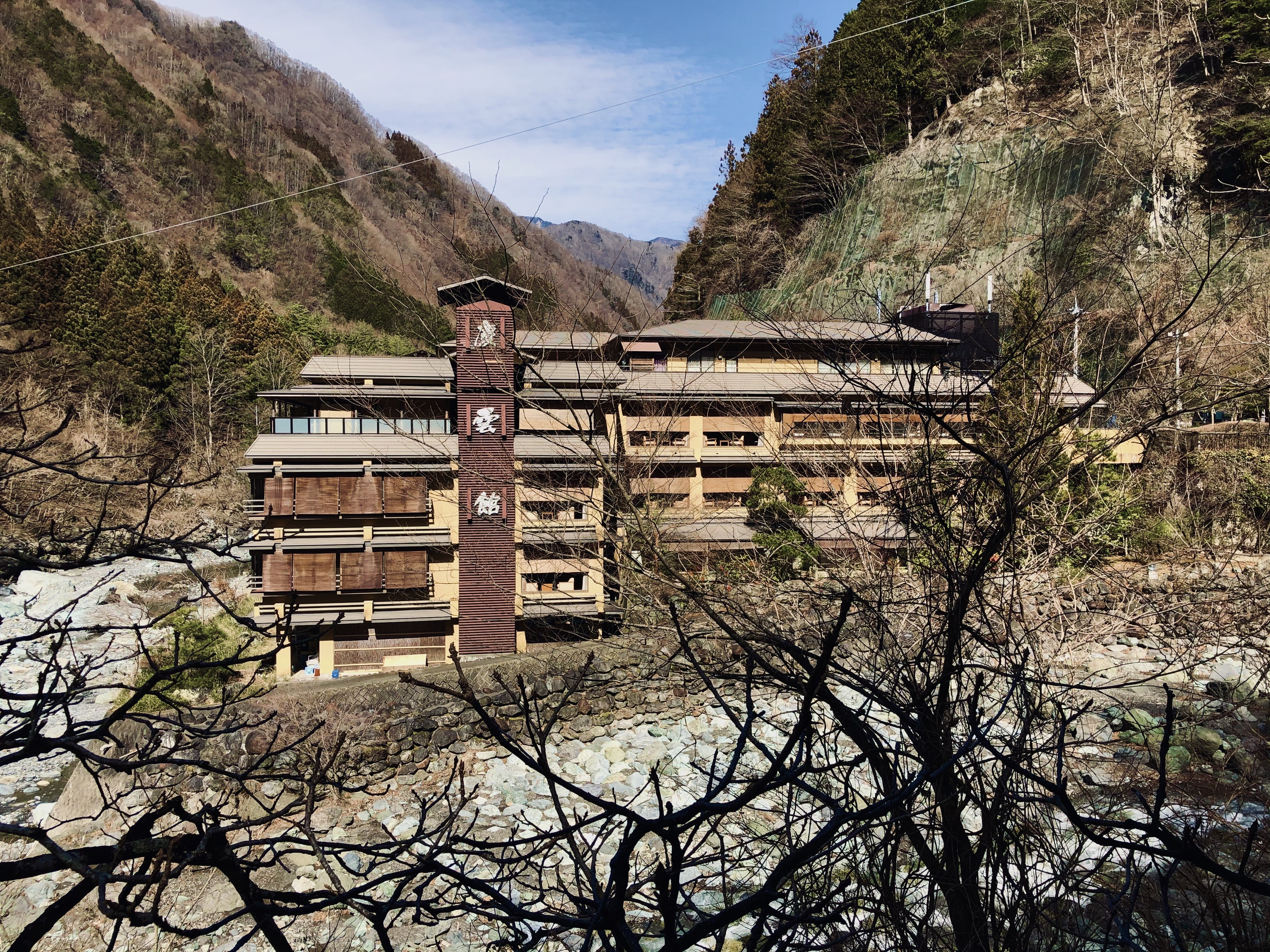
Founded 705, the Nishiyama Onsen Keiunkan is the world's oldest hotel and one of Japan's oldest companies.

Shinise (老舗, lit. 'old shop(s)') are Japanese businesses that have been in operation for at least a hundred years, some more than a thousand years. Japan has significantly more very old businesses than any other country, and Shinise products enjoy a particular prestige in Japan.

== Characteristics ==
Long-established companies are particularly common in Japan, which is home to over half of the world's companies that are older than 200 years. As of 2020, the country had more than 33,000 shinise, of which 3,100 were older than 200 years, 140 older than 500 years and at least 19 who say that they have been operating for over 1,000 years. Shinise are a source of national and regional pride, and are the subject of governmental promotion, business management books and travel guides.

Frequently, shinise are relatively small family businesses guided by a particular set of principles (kakun). These principles tend to emphasize continuity, tradition, longstanding business relationships, sticking to the core business, accumulating cash reserves and avoiding debt and other risk. This limits growth but helps the companies weather even severe crises. Some shinise, however, have grown to be leading players in their fields, such as the video game maker Nintendo or the general contractor Takenaka Corporation.

The prevalence of shinise in Japan is attributed to the particularities of Japanese culture, such as reverence for traditions and one's ancestors, and Japanese history, such as the country's relatively long global isolation prior to the 19th century. To ensure familial continuity, shinise owners without children of their own sometimes adopt one of their male employees. One effect of the high prestige that shinise enjoy in Japan is that startups are less respected or appreciated than elsewhere.

== Shinise products ==
Buying something from a shinise imparts particular prestige in Japan, connoting the "pinnacle of taste". This Japanese preference for shinise is distinguished from the appreciation most societies have for luxury goods in that it does not only include expensive, long-lasting items such as cars and watches, but also everyday objects and food.

This consumer preference may have roots in Japanese society's predilection for conformity, which makes it so that somebody who owns a shinise item is certain not to be ridiculed for it, and frequently respected. As a result, brand loyalty to shinise is often intense, which in turn helps these companies survive for a long time.

== List of shinise ==
This list aims to include all shinise founded before 1600, and selected notable younger shinise.

Company	Location	Business	Date of establishment	Ref.
Kongō Gumi	Osaka, Osaka	Construction	578	
Nisiyama Onsen Keiunkan	Hayakawa, Yamanashi	Hot spring hotel	705	
Koman	Toyooka, Hyōgo	Hotel	717	
Hōshi Ryokan	Ishikawa Prefecture	Hotel	718	
Genda Shigyō	Kyoto, Kyoto	Ceremonial paper goods	771	
Tanaka Iga Butsugu	Kyoto, Kyoto	Buddhist religious goods	885	
Nakamura Shaji	Ichinomiya, Aichi	Construction	970	
Ichimonjiya Wasuke	Kyoto, Kyoto	Confectionery	1000	
Shumiya-Shinbutsuguten		Religious goods	1024	
Takahan Ryokan	Yuzawa, Niigata	Hotel	1075	
Geto Onsen	Kitakami, Iwate	Hotel	1134	
Sudo Honke	Kasama, Ibaraki	Sake	1141	
Tsuen Tea	Uji, Kyoto	Teahouse	1160	
Gorobee Ame		Confectionery	1177–1180	
Fujito		Confectionery	1184	
Kikuoka	Nara, Nara	Herbs	1184	
Sakan Ryokan	Sendai, Miyagi	Hotel	1184	
Ito Tekko		Metalworking	1189	
Shirasagiyu Tawaraya	Kaga, Ishikawa	Hotel	1190	
Kotabe Foundry	Sakuragawa, Ibaraki	Foundry	1190–1199	
Tosen Goshobo	Kobe, Hyōgo	Hotel	1191	
Arima Onsen Okunobo		Hotel	1191	
Yoshinoya Irokuen	Kaga, Ishikawa	Hotel	1192	
Notoya	Komatsu, Ishikawa	Hotel	1311	
Higashiya	Yonezawa, Yamagata	Hotel	1312	
Sankogan	Gose, Nara	Pharmacy	1319	
Korenya Shingetsuan		Confectionery	1327	
Kanbukuro		Confectionery	1329	
Kuroda Sennendo		Confectionery	Bef. 1333	
Maruya Hatco Miso	Okazaki, Aichi	Miso	1337	
Takata		Textiles	1346	
Shiose		Confectionery	1349	
Uiro (company)		Pharmacy	1368	
Matsumaeya		Seaweed	1392	
Namariichi		Chemicals	1395	
Kameya Mutsu		Confectionery	1421	
Saku	Saku, Nagano	Hotel	1428	
Yunushi Ichijoh		Hotel	1428	
Surugaya		Confectionery	1461	
Senkiya		Tea	1462	
Owariya	Kyoto, Kyoto	Restaurant	1465	
Inoue		Tea	1467	
Mizuta Gyokuundo		Confectionery	1477	
Hiraizumi		Sake	1487	
Fukkodo		Brushes	1501	
Tsutaya		Confectionery	1502	
Chigira Jinsentei	Ikaho, Gunma	Hotel	1502	
Kawabata Doki		Confectionery	1503	
Ishiga Honten		Religious goods	1504–1520	
Kenbishi		Sake	Bef. 1505	
Toraya	Tokyo, Tokyo	Confectionery	Abt. 1520	
Yamaji		Sake	1532	
Honke Kojima		Confectionery	1532	
Matsuokaya		Sauce	1534	
Tomita Sake Brewery		Sake	1534	
Izumiya Ryokan		Hotel	1536	
Shusen Kurano		Sake	1540	
Fubokaku		Hotel	1546	
Kunitomo Kyutaro		Gunpowder	1547	
Yoshinogawa		Sake	1548	
Konishi Sake Brewery		Sake	1550	
Sasaiya		Confectionery	1550	
Izeki		Clothing	1550	
Itamuro Onsen Daikokuya	Nasushiobara, Tochigi	Food	1551	
Meien Co., Ltd.	Nagoya, Aichi	Salt	1554	
Chiso	Kyoto, Kyoto	Clothing	1555	
Chikiriya Jihei		Clothing	1555	
Kaikodo		Lacquerware	Bef. 1558	
Kanbayashi Shunsho		Tea	1558	
Ueda		Sake	1558	
Aritsugu	Kyoto, Kyoto	Knives (originally swords)	1560	
Nabeya Bi-tech Kaisha	Seki, Gifu	Machine parts (originally kettles, pots, and bells)	1560	
Okamoto		Iron	1560	
Hasemoku		Real estate	1560	
Ichijoh		Hotel	1560	
Toyahachi		Pottery retail	1560	
Yamagatakan		Hotel	1561	
Otaya Hanuemon		Confectionery	1562	
Shima Tamura		Hotel	1563	
Kojiya		Food	1563	
Taiko Mochi		Confectionery	1565	
Nishikawa (company)		Beds	1566	
Kichijiya		Oil	1568	
Suishodo		Pharmacy	1570	
Isekusuri Honpo		Pharmacy	1570	
Kikuhime		Sake	1570–1600	
Yoshida Gennojo		Religious goods	1572	
Hosoji Inbanten		Stamps	1573	
Nakano		Fish	1573	
Muroji		Sauce	1573	
Otsuya		Retailing	1573	
Shintsu		Building material	1573–1592	
Sonodaya		Confectionery	1573–1592	
Kanbayashi		Tea	1573–1592	
Mitsuboshien Kanbayashi Sannyu		Tea	1573–1592	
Ishikawa		Stone	1573–1592	
Nikenjayamochi Kadoya		Brewery	1575	
Meboso Hachirobee		Fishing flies	1575	
Yanagiya Hozen		Confectionery	1575	
Nippon Kodo		Incense	1575	
Heihachi Jaya		Restaurant	1576	
Kishigon		Hotel	1576	
Gyokueido		Confectionery	1576	
Kobaien		Ink	1577	
Mineyo		Fish	1577	
Lamp no Yado		Hotel	1578	
Tomihiro		Clothing	1578	
Kiguraya		Clothing	1579	
Nakaya		Herbal medicine	1579	
Higashimaru		Sauce	Abt.1580	
Hatano Paint		Paint	1582	
Indenya		Leather	1582	
Koju		Incense	1582	
Onomichizousu	Onomichi, Hiroshima	Vinegar	1582	
Tamaruya		Udon noodles	1582	
Minowa		Lacquerware	1582	
Godayu Kikuya		Confectionery	1584	
Yamato Intec		Metalworking	1584	
Kikuya		Confectionery	1585	
Mercros		Retailer	1585	
Tenshoen		Tea	1585	
Matsui		Construction	1586	
Oyama Shaji		Construction	1586	
Chogoromochi		Confectionery	1587	
Josuian		Confectionery	1587	
Okeka		Furnaces	1588	
Ibasen		Fans	1590	
Kogure		Hotel	1591	
Yamashina		Utensil	1591	
Osugiya Sobee		Confectionery	1592	
Meimon Sakai		Sake	1592	
Kikyoya		Confectionery	1592	
Nezameya		Restaurant	1592	
Koya		Sake	1593	
Yamamotoya		Seed	1593	
Kungyokudo		Incense	1594	
Fujinoya		Fertilizer	1594	
Chojiya		Restaurant	1596	
Toshimaya		Sake	1596	
Takimo		Food	1596	
Oteramochi Kawaido		Confectionery	1596	
Tazen		Metal	1596	
Gyokurinbo		Hotel	1596	
Nagata Bunshodo		Publisher	1596–1615	
Heirakuji		Publisher	1596–1615	
Hayashikan		Clothing	1596–1615	
Kojima		Sake	1597	
Kuwanaya		Confectionery	1597	
Uzu Kyumeigan		Pharmacy	1597	
Ryujin		Sake	1597	
Chinjukan		Pottery	1598	
Wakanoura Imoto		Pharmacy	1598	
Watahan		Construction	1598	
Nakazato Moemon		Pottery	1598	
Minatoya Yurei-kosodate-ame		Confectionery	Bef. 1599	
Umai Chemical		Chemicals (originally salt)	1599	
Boun		Hotel	1599	
Kyorin		Clothing	1599	
Shichiyama Hospital		Hospital	1599	
Takenaka	Osaka, Osaka	Construction	1610	
Gekkeikan	Kyoto, Kyoto	Sake and plum wine	1637	
Nintendo	Kyoto, Kyoto	Video games (originally playing cards)	1889	
Takamatsu Construction Group	Yodogawa-ku, Osaka	Construction	1917	
Kikkoman	Noda, Chiba	Soy sauce and other food	1917	

== See also ==
- List of oldest companies
