= Yoshinoya Irokuen =

- Native name: よしのや依緑園
- Industry: Hotel
- Founded: 1192
- Headquarters: Yamanaka Onsen, Kaga, Ishikawa Prefecture, Japan
- Website: yoshinoyairokuen.jp

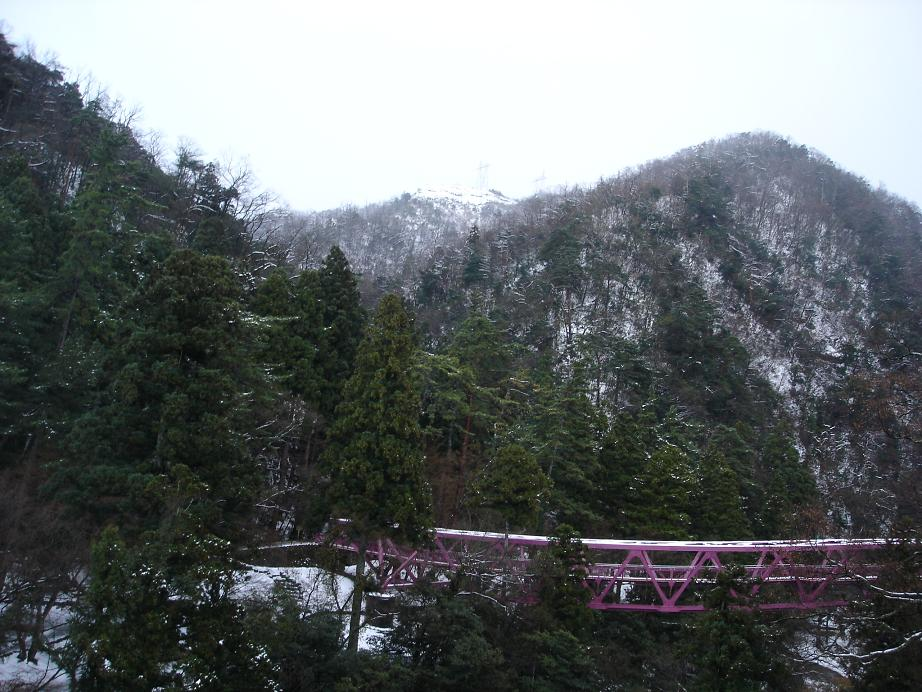
Yoshinoya Irokuen is in the Kakusenkei valley surrounded by mountains.

Yoshinoya Irokuen (Japanese: よしのや依緑園) is a traditional Japanese ryokan (inn) established in 1192, the second oldest (after Shirasagiyu Tawaraya) in Yamanaka Onsen town, part of Kaga city in Ishikawa Prefecture, Japan.

Yamanaka Onsen is a well-known hot spring in the Kakusenkei valley surrounded by mountains, with a long history and folk culture. Local baths contain calcium-sodium sulfate water and purportedly can help with numerous diseases.

== See also ==
- Onsen
- List of oldest companies
