= Koman (hotel) =

Old inn in Toyooka, Japan

Sennen no Yu Koman (千年の湯古まん)
- Location within Japan

General information
- Status: Operational
- Architectural style: Japanese architecture
- Location: Kinosaki, Hyogo Prefecture, Japan
- Coordinates: 35°37′29.8″N 134°48′19.4″E
- Opened: 717; 1309 years ago

Design and construction
- Known for: 2nd oldest hotel in the world

Website
- www.sennennoyu-koman.com

Sennen no Yu Koman (千年の湯古まん) is a traditional Japanese inn (ryokan) in Kinosaki, Toyooka city, Hyōgo prefecture, Japan.

Koman was founded in 717. This makes it a long-established business (shinise), the second oldest hotel in Japan - after the Nishiyama Onsen Keiunkan in Yamanashi Prefecture - and one of the oldest companies in the world.

The ryokan was established by Hiuke Gonnokami (日生下権守) and his descendants founded local bath houses in Kinosaki Onsen. The establishment was passed on for over 46 generations.

The history of the ryokan is based on two historic documents: the Hiuke Family Heirloom Chronicle (Hiuke-shi Kahō Kyūki 日生下氏家宝旧記), which summarizes the history of Kinosaki Onsen, and the Mandala Chronicle (Mandara-ki 曼陀羅記), which describes the creation of the Kinosaki hot spring resort, and the establishment of Mandarayu (曼陀羅湯) hot spring. These documents have been handed down over many generations.

In 708, Hiuke Gonnokami, a descendant of Hiuke family, is said to have had a dream that led to the establishment of the nearby Shishojinja Shrine. Then in 717, a Buddhist priest named Dōchi Shōnin (道智上人), came to the shrine to pray. He did this for 1,000 days, when he is said to have used his vajra to cause a hot spring miraculously appear.

According to Koman's website, the sacred place where Dōchi Shōnin did his religious practice was called the Mandara Yashiki (曼陀羅屋敷). After that, the name of the residence became Mandara-ya (曼陀羅屋). Mandara-ya changed its name to Komandaraya (古曼陀羅屋) in the Meiji (era) (1868 – 1912) before being renamed as the current Sennen no Yu Koman (千年の湯古まん). The website notes that neighboring Mandarayu Bath (Mandara-yu まんだら湯), 80 meters to the south, is a modern establishment opened after 1868.

Other sources indicate that Mandara-yu (not Mandara-ya) is renowned as one of Kinosaki's very first hot springs. The town of Kinosaki appears in various historical documents that can authenticate its founding to 720 AD.

== See also ==
- List of oldest companies – several hundred notably old companies.
