= Iwanumaya Hotel =

Hot spring hotel

Coordinates: 38.22646103022243°N 140.7208168799501°E

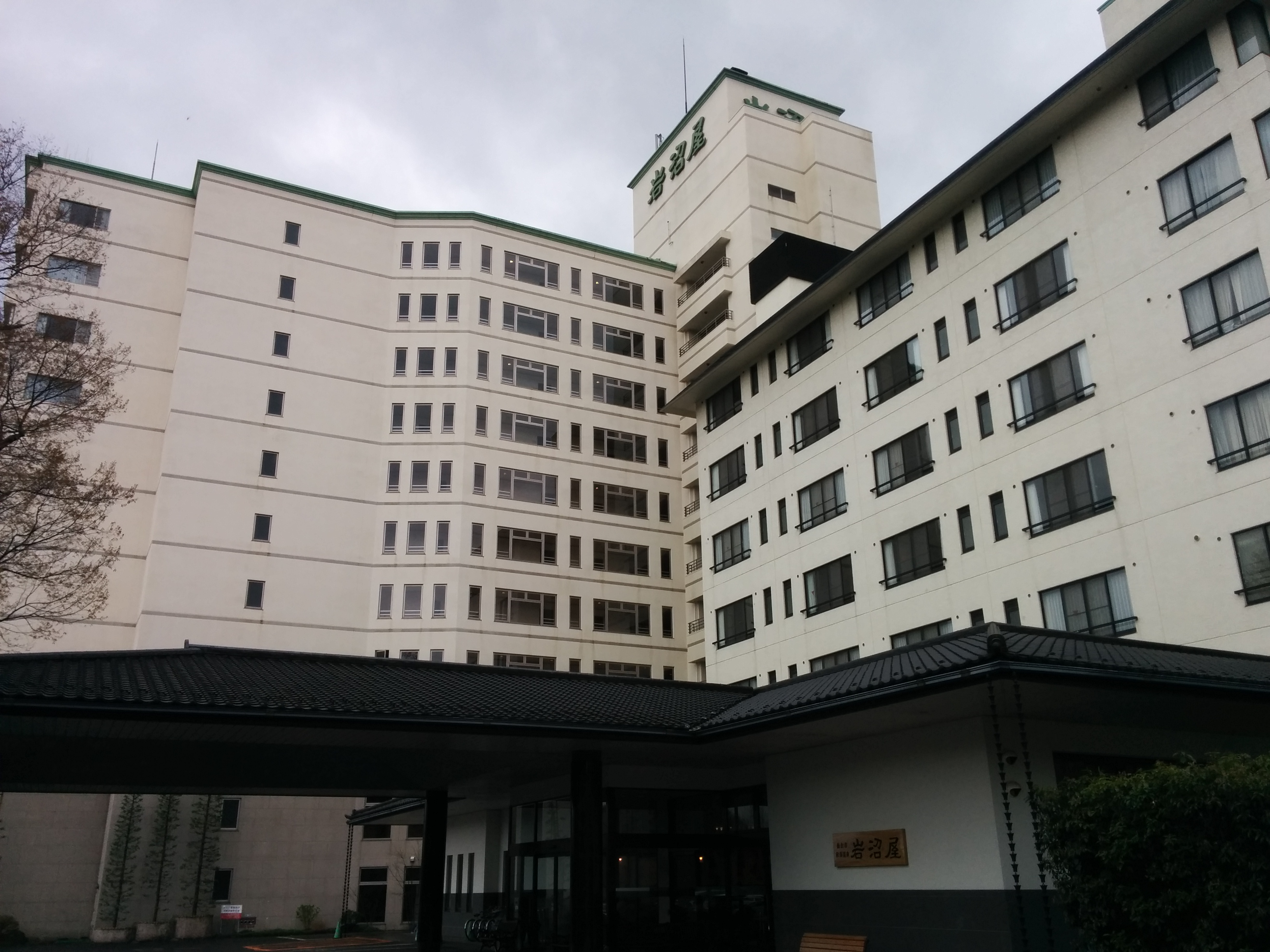
Front of Iwanumaya Hotel

Iwanumaya Hotel (岩沼屋) is a hot spring ryokan located in Akiu Onsen, Taihaku Ward, Sendai City, Miyagi Prefecture.

== Facilities ==
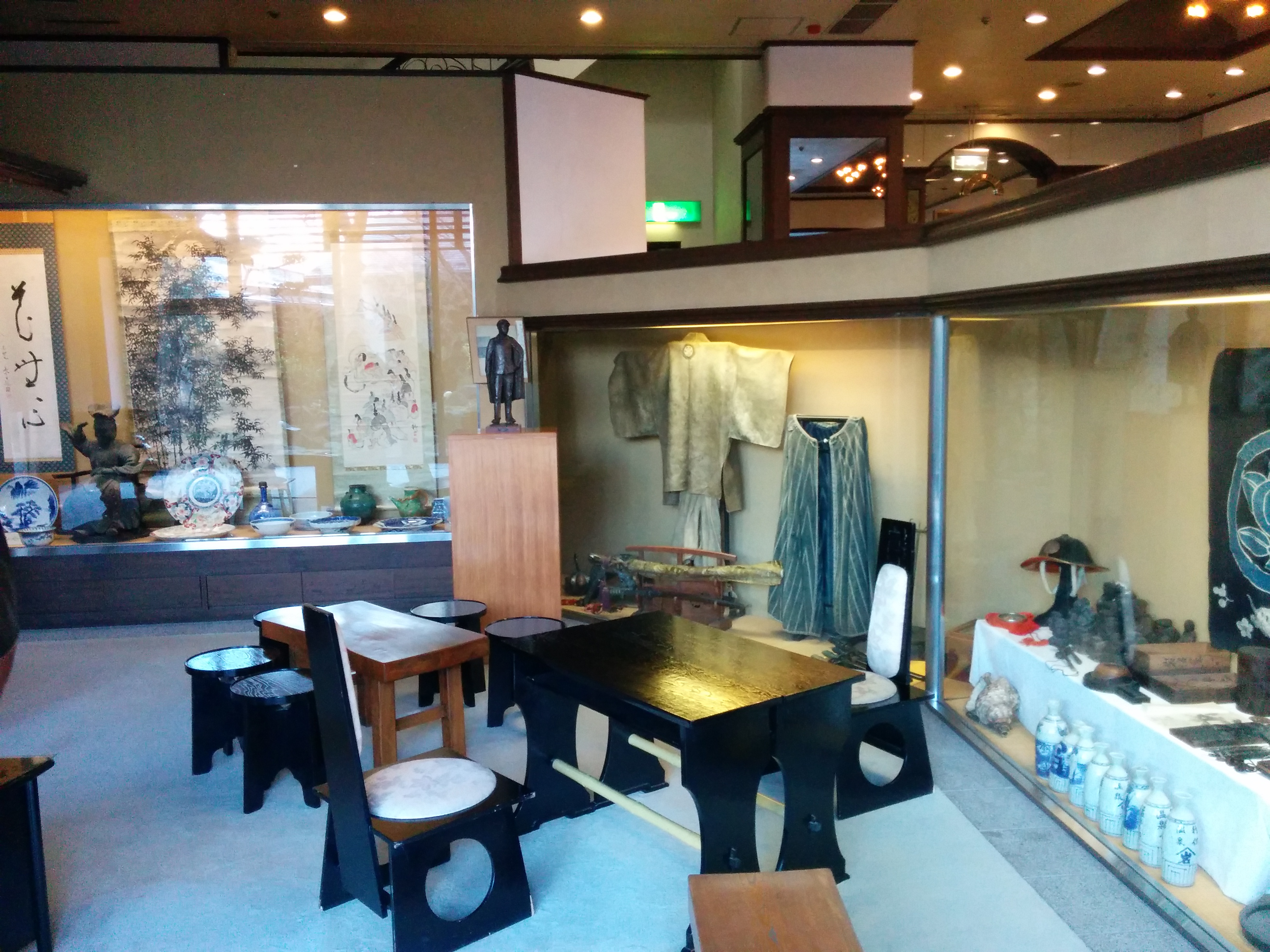
Iwanumaya Hotel museum exhibit

The hotel features Japanese, Western, and mixed style rooms for a total of 148 rooms with capacity for 600 guests. There are indoor and outdoor baths separated by gender, however there is also a private family bath available to rent for an additional fee. Changing rooms, sauna, and showers are also inside the bathing facilities. Other hotel facilities include a convention hall, banquet hall, special conference room, party room, conference room, karaoke salon, este and massage, bar, two restaurants, a noodle shop, gift shop, smoking room, and small-scale museum displays. The hotel is located next to the 1,000 year old Hotel Sakan.

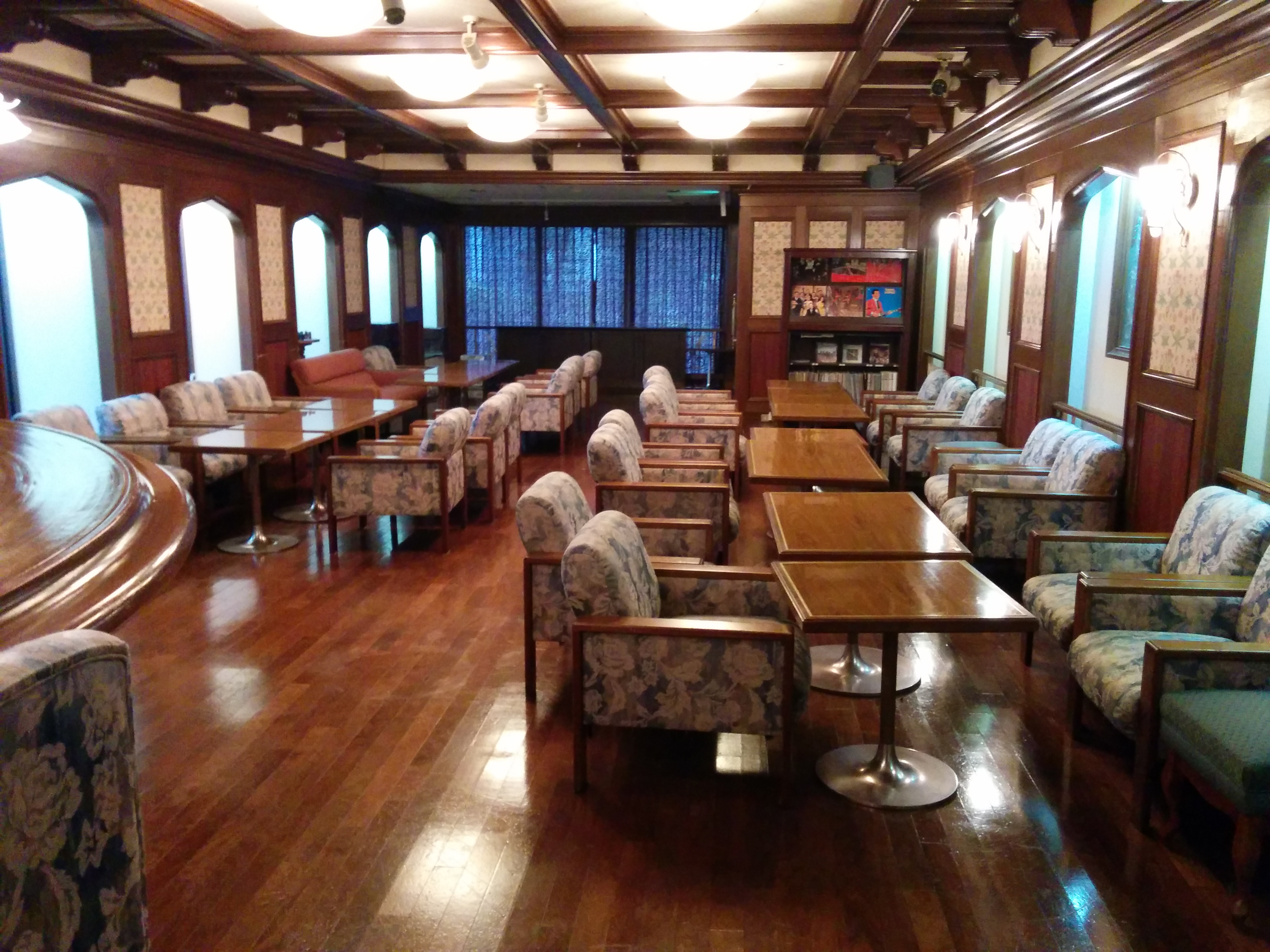
Oldies Bar Karin

== History ==
The hot springs of Iwanumaya Hotel have been used since 1625.

- 1625 Founded
- 1952 July - First President Tachibana Naka establishes "Limited Company Iwanumaya Ryokan"
- 1953 Remodel and expansion of rooms, large bath, etc. laid the foundation for today's hotel. Also during this period, the hotel became a member of the Japan Onsen Association and the Japan Tourism Ryokan Federation. The hotel has been designated a selected hotel by tavel agencies such at JTB.
- 1961 January - Renamed "Limited Company Iwanumaya Hotel"
- 1965 November -Registered as a government international tourist inn (No. 600).
- 1984 October - Construction of new annex Reireikan (麗景館)
- 1995 October - Construction of new annex Seiryō-kan (清涼館)

2011 Damage from the Great East Japan Earthquake

- March 11 -The infrastructure of the hotel became inoperable, thus customer reservations were suspended. However, the buildings were designed to 120% of seismic standards. Therefore, it was designated by the nation as a wide-area emergency base for relief teams and emergency fire-fighting assistance corps.
- March 19 - Daily bathing in hot springs reopened to public
- April 1 - Except in the rooms provided for emergency teams, regular business resumed as part of "disaster recovery" (震災復興).
- April 4 - Lunch and hot spring day use plan resumed
- April 28 - Return to business as usual as pre-disaster conditions

== Additional information ==
Iwanumaya Hotel was scheduled to be the Press Center for the G7 Finance Ministers and Central Bank Governors' Meeting held 20–21 May 2016 in Sendai.

Iwanumaya Hotel was featured as a location in the 32nd episode of the TV Asahi drama Seibu Keisatsu PART-III, a police drama television program running 3 April 1983 to 22 October 1984.
