= Kikuoka =

Kikuoka (written: 菊岡) is a Japanese surname. Notable people with the surname include:

- Kuri Kikuoka (菊岡 久利, 1909 –1970), Japanese writer
- Takuro Kikuoka (菊岡 拓朗, born 1985), Japanese footballer

== Fictional characters ==
- Seijirō Kikuoka (菊岡 征二郎), a character in the light novel series Sword Art Online

== See also ==
- 8492 Kikuoka, a main-belt asteroid
- Kikuoka Chinese Medicine
