= Notoya =

- Native name: 旅亭懐石 のとや
- Industry: Hotel
- Founded: 1311
- Headquarters: 85 Wa, Awazumachi, 923-0326 Komatsu, Ishikawa Prefecture, Japan
- Website: www.notoya.co.jp

Notoya is a traditional Japanese ryokan in Komatsu, Ishikawa Prefecture in Japan. It was founded in 1311 near the Awazu Onsen and today offers hot spring baths and food.

== See also ==
- List of oldest companies
