= Itamuro Onsen Daikokuya =

Daikokuya
- Native name: 板室温泉 大黒屋
- Industry: Hotel
- Founded: 1551
- Headquarters: 856 Itamuro, 325-0111 Nasushiobara, Tochigi Prefecture, Japan
- Website: www.itamuro-daikokuya.com/en

Itamuro Onsen Daikokuya is a traditional ryokan with restaurant in Nasushiobara city, Japan founded in 1551. Itamuro Onsen is a historic area and its hot springs are known from 1059. Since then onsen has been highly-sought after for its curing effects and a high natural water quality. In 1551 was founded as "Daikokuya Ryokan" and for generations it is popular for visitors to relax and enjoy hot springs, art collection, nature, and fine food.

Hot spring source temperature ranges from 38º to 45º Celsius, and is suitable also for guests unaccustomed to hot baths. Available is an open-air bath, a stone bath, and a wooden bath. Itamuro Onsen has been recognized as a “National Health Spa” by the Ministry of the Environment in 1971.

== See also ==
- List of oldest companies
