= Chigira Jinsentei =

Ryokan in Gunma Prefecture

- Native name: 千明仁泉亭
- Industry: Hotel
- Founded: 1502
- Headquarters: 45 Ikaho, Shibukawa, Japan
- Website: www.jinsentei.com

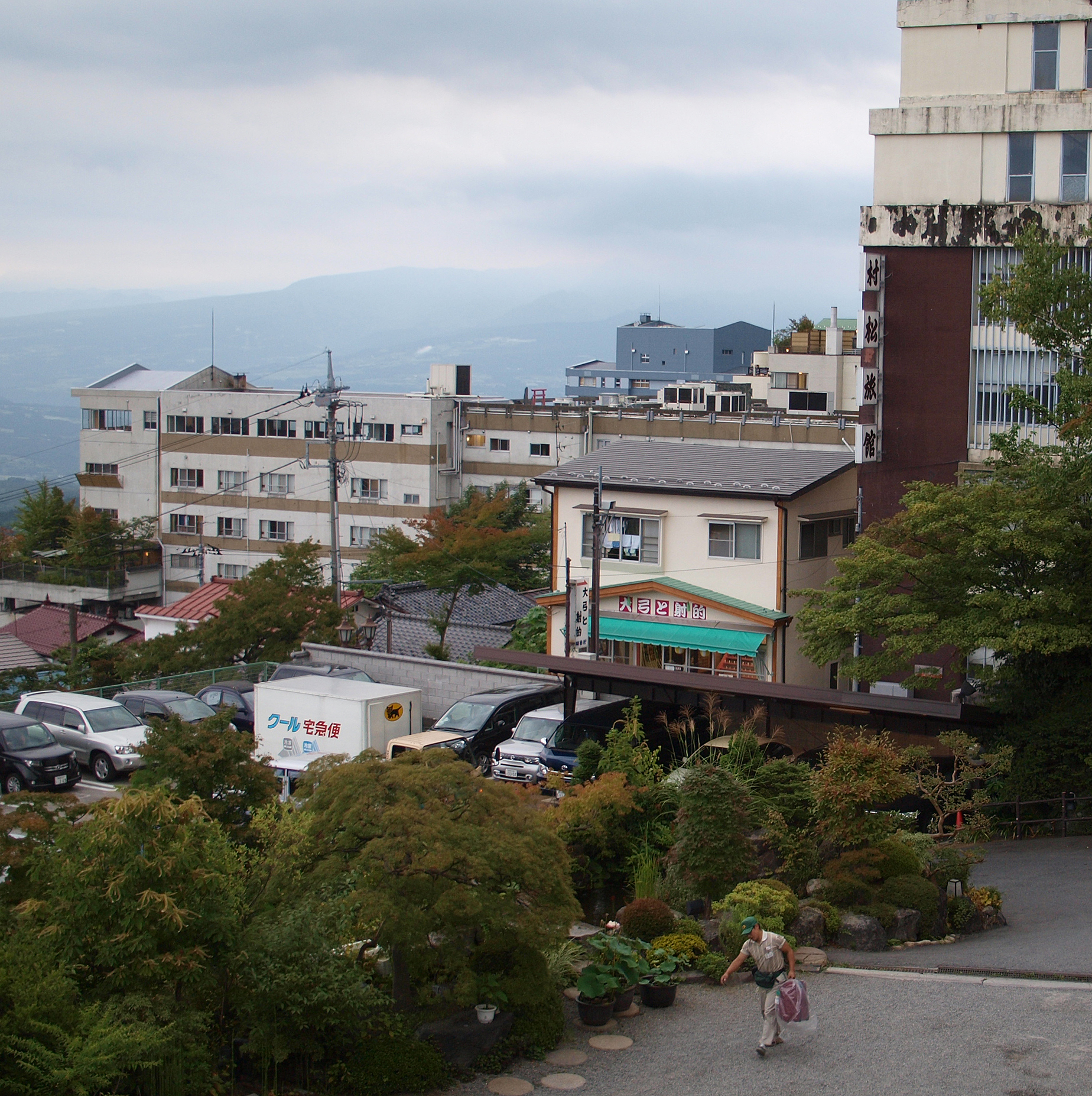
Chigira Jinsentei ryokan

Chigira Jinsentei is the oldest ryokan (Japanese inn) in Ikaho, the part of Shibukawa city, Gunma Prefecture.

The basic facts:

- in 1502 the ryokan was founded in Ikaho, utilizing the Ikaho Onsen for the hot spring baths
- local onsen is about 2000 years old, noted already in Man'yōshū, the ancient Japanese poetry collection
- in 1900 popular writer Kenjirō Tokutomi wrote here his book Hototogisu
- the building was reconstructed after a fire about 100 years ago
- the reddish-brown spring water can help with feminine diseases.

== See also ==
- List of oldest companies
