= Saku Hotel =

- Native name: 佐久ホテル
- Industry: Hotel
- Founded: 1428
- Headquarters: 553 Iwamurada, Saku, Nagano, Nagano Prefecture, Japan
- Website: www.sakusaku.co.jp

Saku Hotel (佐久ホテル in Japanese) is a traditional onsen ryokan in Saku city, Nagano Prefecture, Japan and provides a natural hot spring baths.

== History ==
The history of the hotel dates back to 1428, when Mori Shinozawa Kawachi Mamoru lived in this place as a lord, and the company in Nagano Prefecture.

The house was created during the Muromachi era, became a hotel in the Meiji era, and Shinozawa Family is still inheriting the business at the same place. There are many documents from foundation to modern day, including the notes given by Ashikaga Shogun and General Tokugawa.

== See also ==
- List of oldest companies
