= Sakan Ryokan =

Hot springs hotel in Sendai, Miyagi Prefecture, Japan

Coordinates: 38.22735°N 140.72025°E

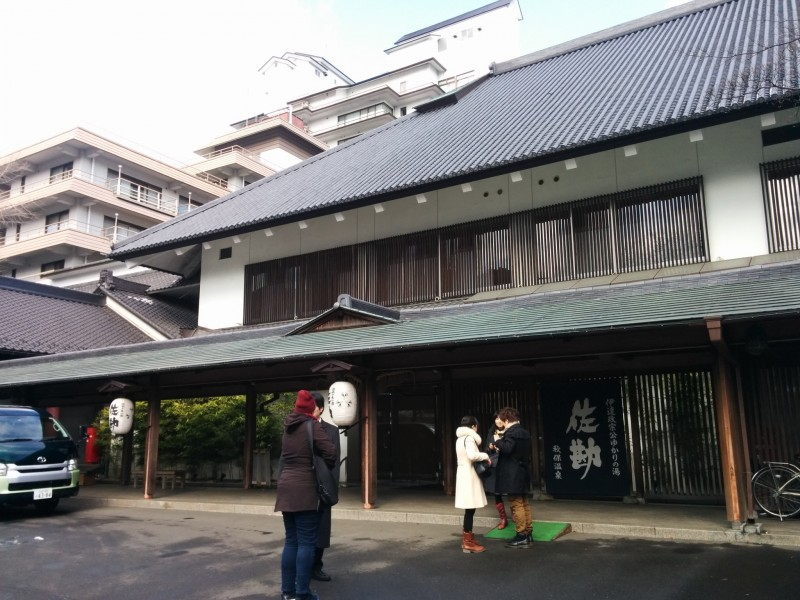
Front view of Sakan Hotel

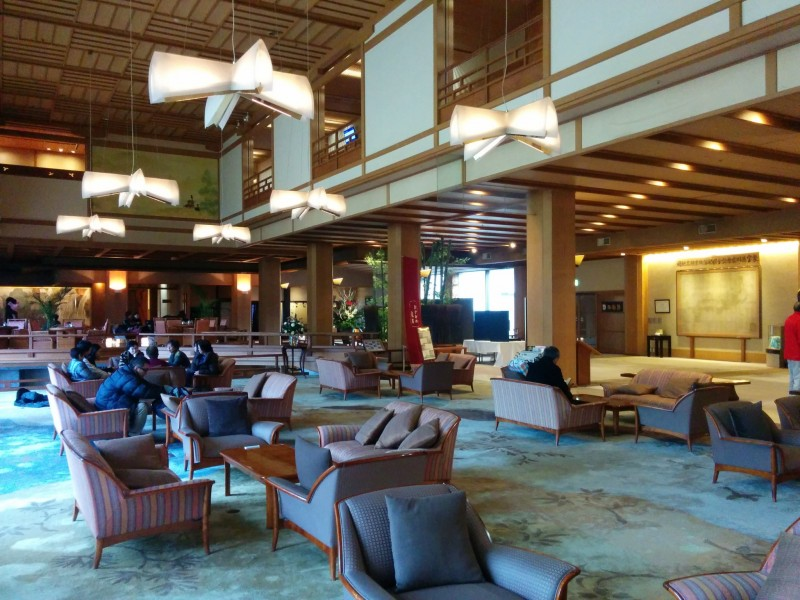
Sakan Hotel lobby

Sakan Ryokan or "Hotel Sakan" (ホテル佐勘) is an historic ryokan (Japanese inn) located in Sendai, Miyagi Prefecture, Japan. The inn is over 1,000 years old, and is located within the spa resort named "Akiu Spa," which has four communal onsen (baths) that are supplied by natural hot springs. The hot springs are one of the three oldest ones in Japan, and are located near the Natori River. The inn was originally started by a man named Kanzaburo Satoh, whom the inn is named after. Ownership of the inn has been handed down to Satoh's descendants for 34 generations. It is located next to the 400 year old Iwanumaya Hotel.

== See also ==
- List of oldest companies
