= Shirasagiyu Tawaraya =

Japanese inn

- Industry: Hotel
- Founded: 1190
- Headquarters: Yamanaka Onsen, Kaga, Ishikawa, Japan
- Website: en.tawaraya.co.jp

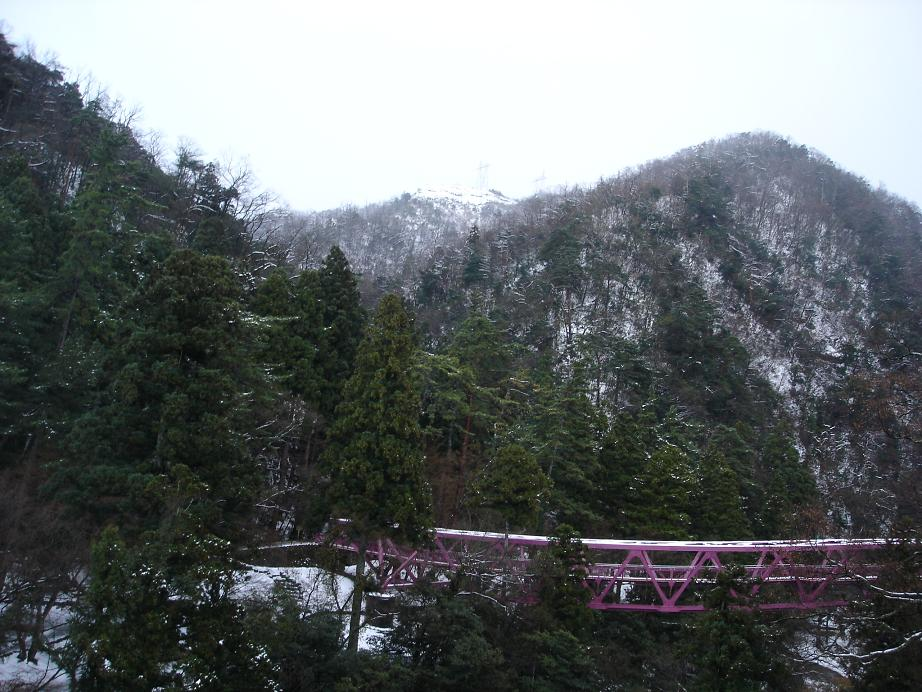
Hotel is located in the Kakusenkei valley surrounded by mountains.

Shirasagiyu Tawaraya is a traditional Japanese ryokan (inn) established in 1190, the oldest in Yamanaka Onsen town, part of Kaga city in Ishikawa Prefecture, Japan. The hotel is operated by the same family for over 800 years, now up to the 25th generation.

Yamanaka Onsen is a famous hot spring in the Kakusenkei valley surrounded by mountains, with a long history and a rich culture.

Water baths from the local natural spring were described in poems from the 17th century by famous Japanese poet Matsuo Bashō. The spring water contains calcium, sodium, sulfate and is reputed to help with arthritis, gastroenteric disorders, neuralgia, external injuries and other diseases.

== See also ==
- Onsen
- List of oldest companies
