= Higashiya =

- Native name: 東屋旅館
- Industry: Hotel
- Founded: 1312
- Headquarters: Yonezawa, Yamagata Prefecture, Japan
- Website: www.shirabu-higashiya.com

Higashiya is a traditional ryokan in Shirabu Onsen village near Yonezawa city, Yamagata Prefecture, Japan. It was founded in 1312 and offers hot spring baths provided by the local onsen.

== See also ==
- List of oldest companies
