= Nakamura Shaji =

Japanese construction company

- Native name: 中村社寺
- Company type: Kabushiki gaisha
- Industry: Construction
- Founded: 970; 1056 years ago
- Headquarters: Ichinomiya, Aichi Prefecture, Japan
- Website: http://nakamurasyaji.co.jp

Nakamura Shaji (Japanese: 株式会社中村社寺, Kabushiki Gaisha Nakamura Shaji) is a Japanese construction company located in Aichi Prefecture, Japan and is continuously working from 970. It is the second oldest Japanese construction company after Kongō Gumi.

Using wood working and carving the company specializes in building Buddhist temples and Shinto shrines.

The company website contains various construction related Shinto items.

== See also ==
- List of oldest companies
