= Nishiyama Onsen Keiunkan =

Hot spring hotel in Hayakawa, Japan

Coordinates: 35°33′15.9″N 138°18′21.7″E

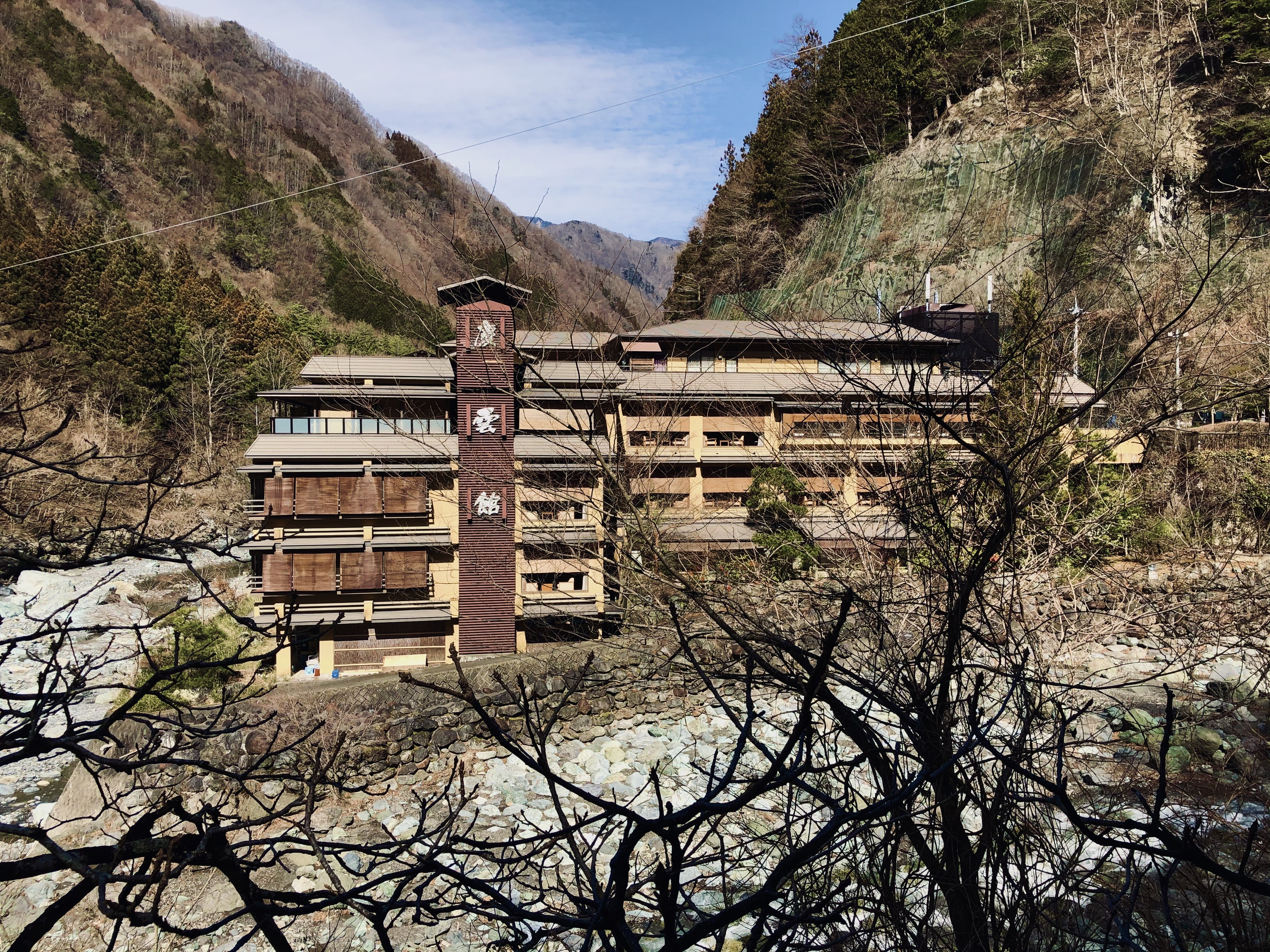
- Nishiyama Onsen Keiunkan in March, 2020
- Native name: 西山温泉慶雲館
- Company type: Private
- Industry: Hospitality industry
- Founded: 705; 1321 years ago in Hayakawa, Japan
- Founder: Fujiwara no Mahito
- Key people: Kenjiro Kawano (president)
- Services: Hot springs; Dining; Lodging
- Owner: Nishiyama Onsen Keiunkan Limited
- Website: keiunkan.co.jp

Nishiyama Onsen Keiunkan (Japanese: 西山温泉慶雲館, lit. 'Keiun-era Nishiyama Hot Spring') is an onsen ryokan (Japanese hot spring inn) in Yamanashi Prefecture. Founded in 705 by Fujiwara no Mahito, it is a prime example of shinise ("long-established business") and perhaps the oldest independent company in operation following the acquisition of construction company Kongō Gumi in 2006.

In 2011, the Keiunkan was recognized by Guinness World Records as the oldest hotel in the world despite the hotel facilities on site being only a few decades old.

== History ==
Keiunkan lies at the foot of the Akaishi Mountains. Since its founding, the onsen has had all its hot water sourced directly from the local Hakuho Springs. The onsen was created by Fujiwara no Mahito, son of an aide to the 38th Emperor of Japan, Emperor Tenji. The springs gained popularity and attracted bathers from various parts of Japan. The onsen's guests included Takeda Shingen, Tokugawa Ieyasu, and the reigning Emperor of Japan, Naruhito.

The onsen was continually developed over its millennium of existence, with rudimentary pools in caves being replaced with more finished baths in wood huts, which were themselves replaced and refined iteratively over centuries. Keiunkan underwent its most drastic transformation in 1997 when dedicated lodgings were created and the business became a ryokan offering private rooms with futons and half board. In 2005, private, free-flowing hot spring baths were added to every room.

Until 2017, it was continuously operated by 52 generations of the same family (including adopted heirs) for over 1,300 years. In 2017, no family members were willing to take over the business. Keiunkan's general manager, Kenjiro Kawano, was selected as the new president. Because Kawano was unrelated to the owner he was unable to inherit Yushima, the holding company. Ownership of Keiunkan was transferred to a new holding company, Nishiyama Onsen Keiunkan Limited, and Yushima was dissolved.

== Description ==
It has 37 rooms, a kaiseki restaurant, and a moon-viewing platform. As of 2019, all rooms and facilities of the hotel have password free Wi-Fi. Tatami mats and classic art furnish the rooms. The staff wear nibu-shiki (two piece) kimono. The hot baths' machinery pumps 1,000 liters of naturally heated water per minute and there are plans to double that capacity.

== See also ==
- Three Ancient Springs
- List of oldest companies – for several hundred notably old companies.
