= Heihachi Jaya =

- Industry: Restaurant
- Founded: 1576
- Headquarters: 8-1 Yamabana-Kawagishicho, Sakyou-ku, 606-8005 Kyoto, Kyoto Prefecture, Japan
- Website: www.heihachi.co.jp/english

Heihachi Jaya is one of the oldest restaurants in Japan, founded in 1576, and located on the bank of Takano River in Kyoto city, Kyoto Prefecture.

The restaurant was included in famous literary works and Kyogens, traditional comical theatre plays.

== See also ==
- List of oldest companies
