= Umai Chemical =

Japanese chemical company

Umai Chemical Co., Ltd.
- Native name: 馬居化成工業株式会社
- Founded: January 1944
- Headquarters: Naruto City, Tokushima Prefecture, Japan
- Key people: Masaharu Umai (President)
- Products: Chemicals
- Number of employees: 60 as of May 2011
- Website: www.umaichem.co.jp/e_index.html (in English) www.umaichem.co.jp (in Japanese)

Umai Chemical Co., Ltd. (馬居化成工業株式会社, Umai Kasei Kōgyō) is a Japanese chemical company, mainly engaged in the production and sales of inorganic chemicals. The company's headquarters is in Naruto City, Tokushima Prefecture, Japan.

== Products ==
Magnesium sulfate is Umai Chemical's main product and it has the top market share for sales of it in Japan. Other products manufactured include liquid magnesium chloride, sodium nitrate, nickel nitrate, dipping agents for cows ("Silky Dip"; antiseptic for protection from mastitis) and AdBlue. The company also trades in more than 100 chemical products and has the offices in Tokyo, Osaka, and Tokushima.
