= Yamanaka Onsen =

Hot spring resort town in Ishikawa Prefecture, Japan

Yamanaka Onsen 山中温泉
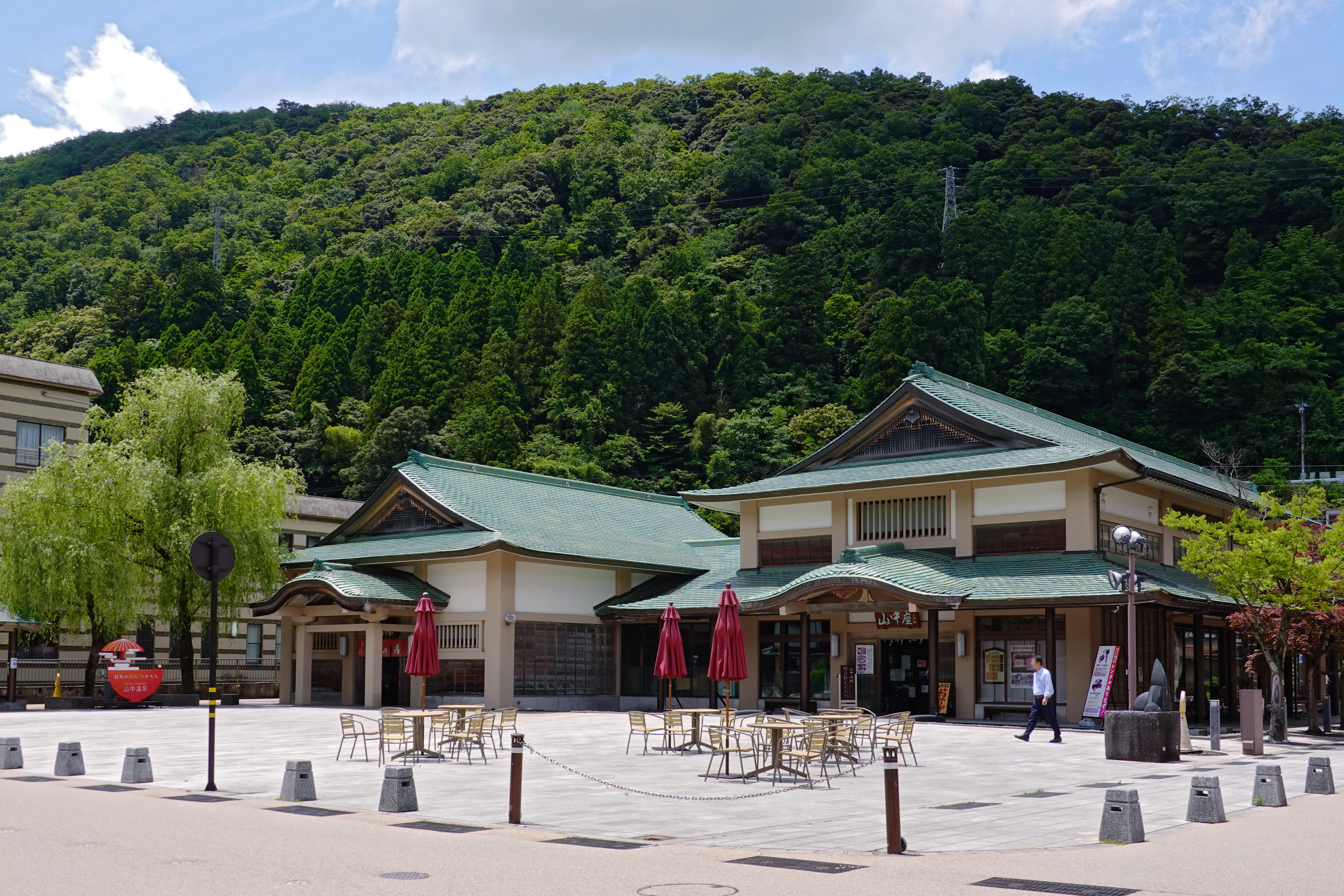
- Kikunoyu (left) and Yamanakaza theatre (right)

- Location within Japan
- Interactive map of Yamanaka Onsen 山中温泉
- Location: Kaga, Ishikawa, Japan
- Coordinates: 36.24712°N 136.372797°E
- Elevation: 0 m (0 ft)
- Type: slightly alkaline
- Discharge: 773 liters/min
- Temperature: 48.3 deg C

Yamanaka Onsen (山中温泉, yamanaka onsen) is a hot spring resort in the city of Kaga, Ishikawa Prefecture, Japan. As its name implies, it is in a mountainous region. The Daishoji River runs through the resort. It is a popular tourist spot for Japanese and foreign travelers.

This hot spring has one hotel and 20 ryokan.

== History ==
Yamanaka Onsen has a very ancient history, and there are several myths about its foundation. One story attributes it to the wandering Buddhist monk Gyōki in the Nara period. Another story states that the Kamakura period samurai Hasebe Nobutsura discovered the springs while following an injured white heron and seeing it bathe in the hot waters.

It was patronised in the Muromachi period by the Ikkō-ikki leader Rennyo and was visited in the Edo period by the poet Matsuo Bashō.

During World War II, it was designated as a military hospital area for the Imperial Japanese Navy.

== See also ==
- Yamanaka, Ishikawa
- Great sugi of Kayano

== Gallery ==
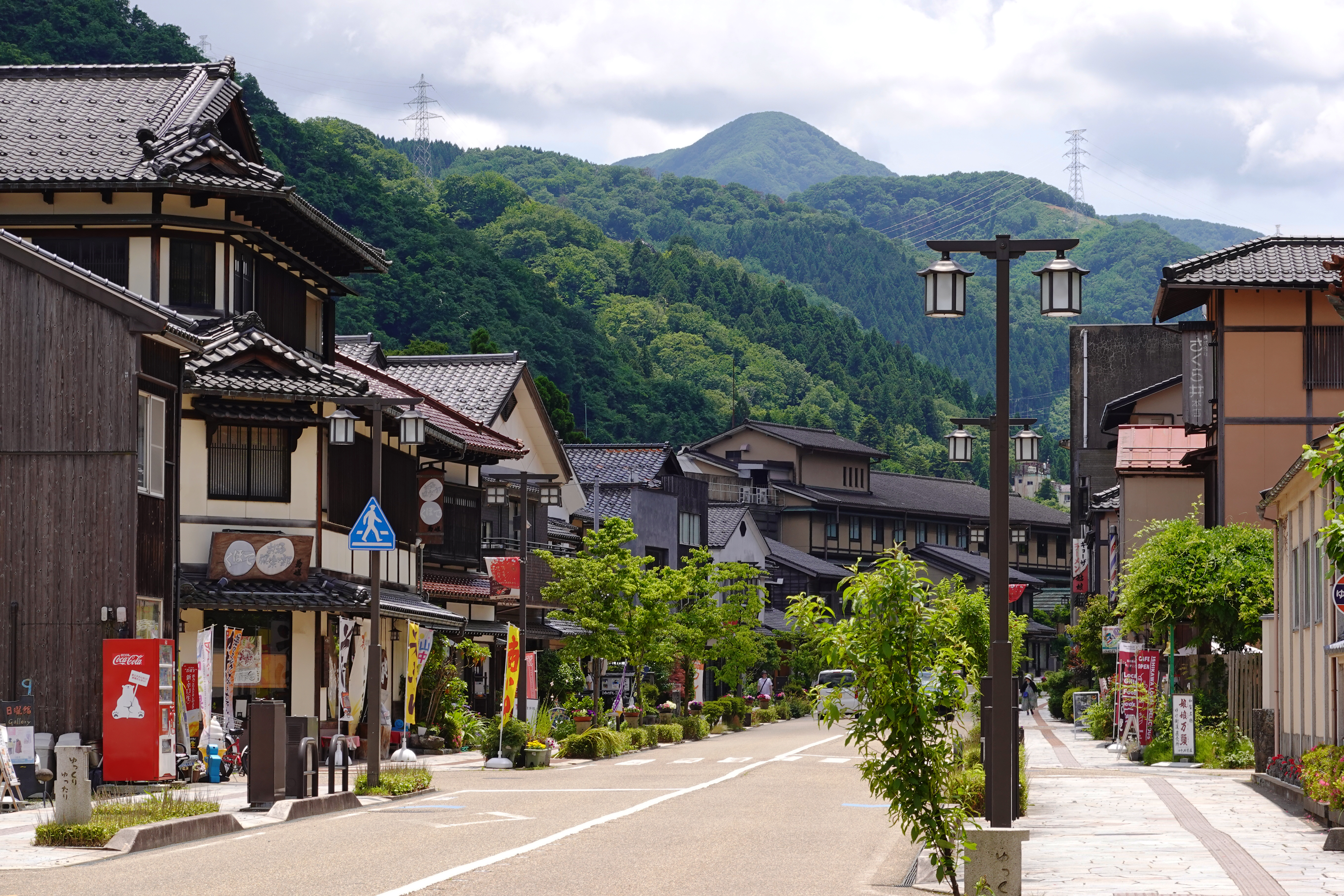
Yuge street

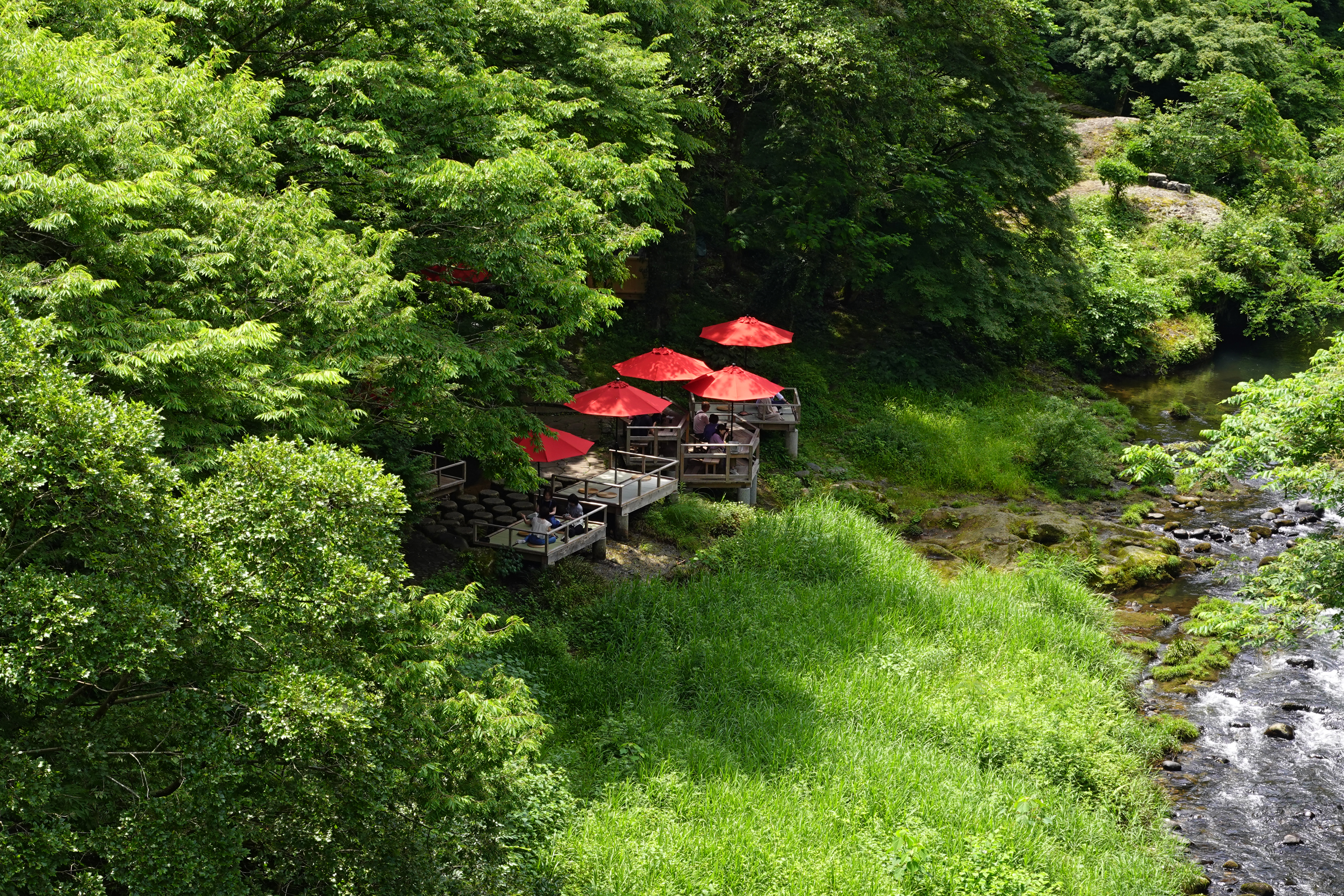
Kakusen gorge

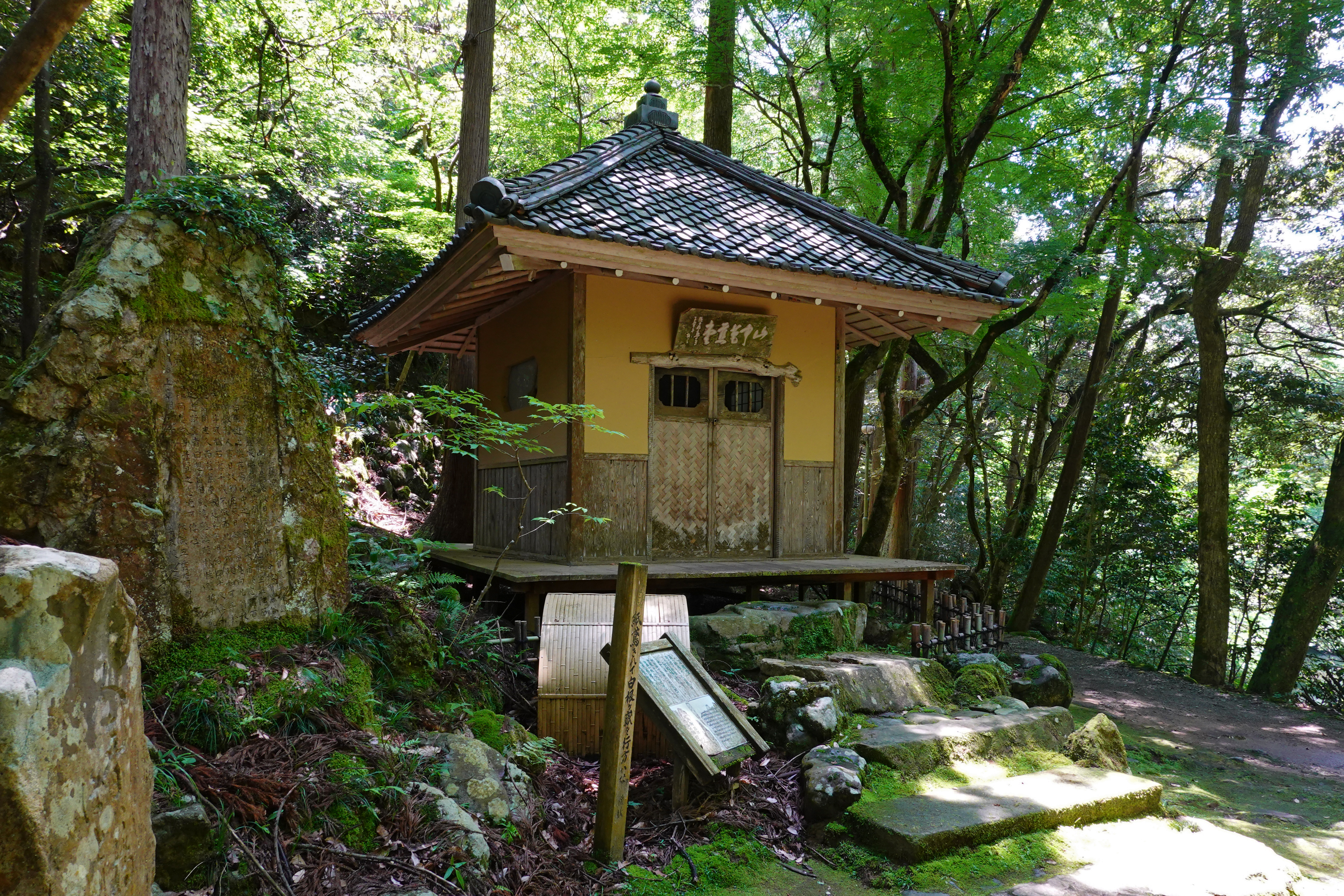
Bashō-do

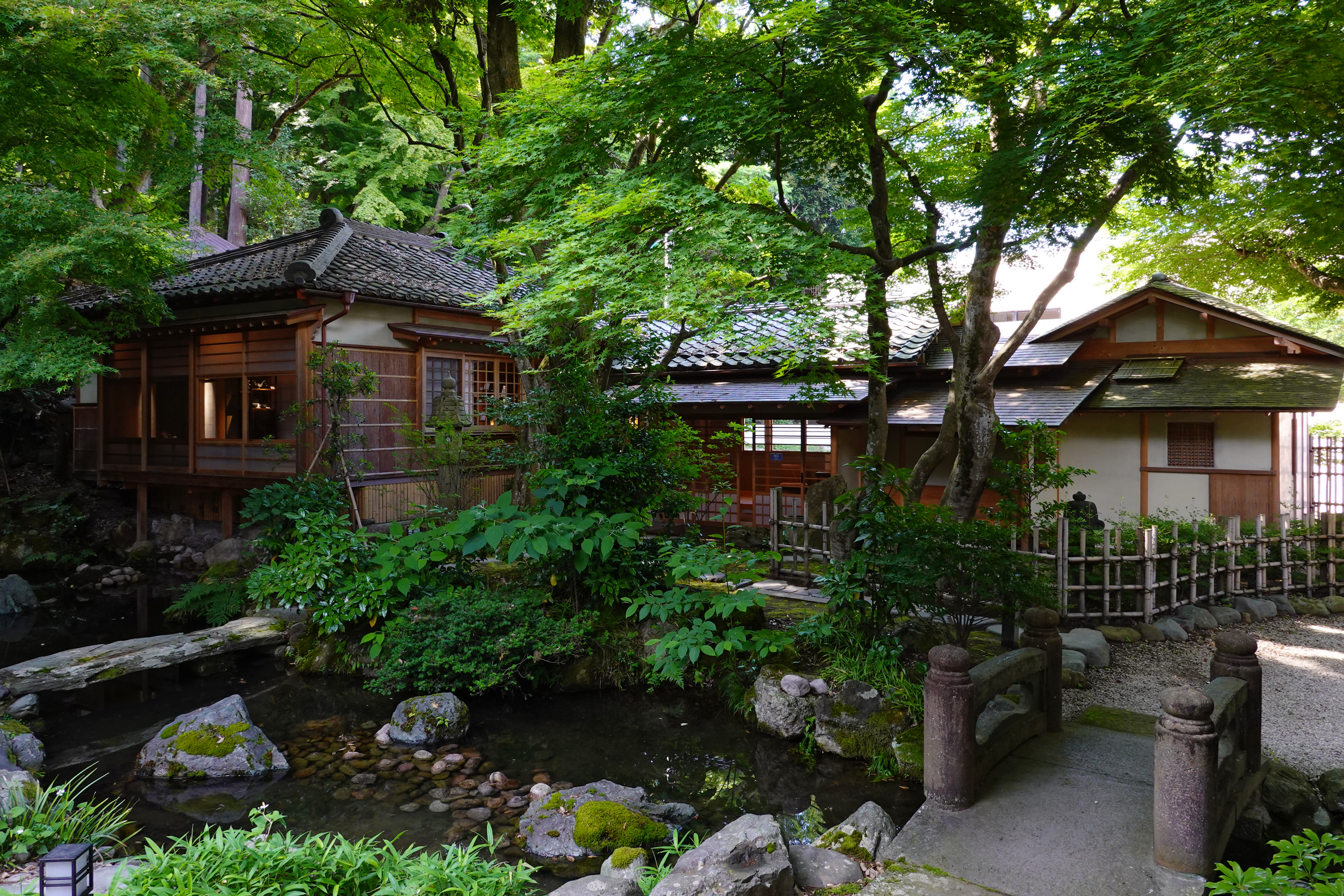
Kagairyokuen

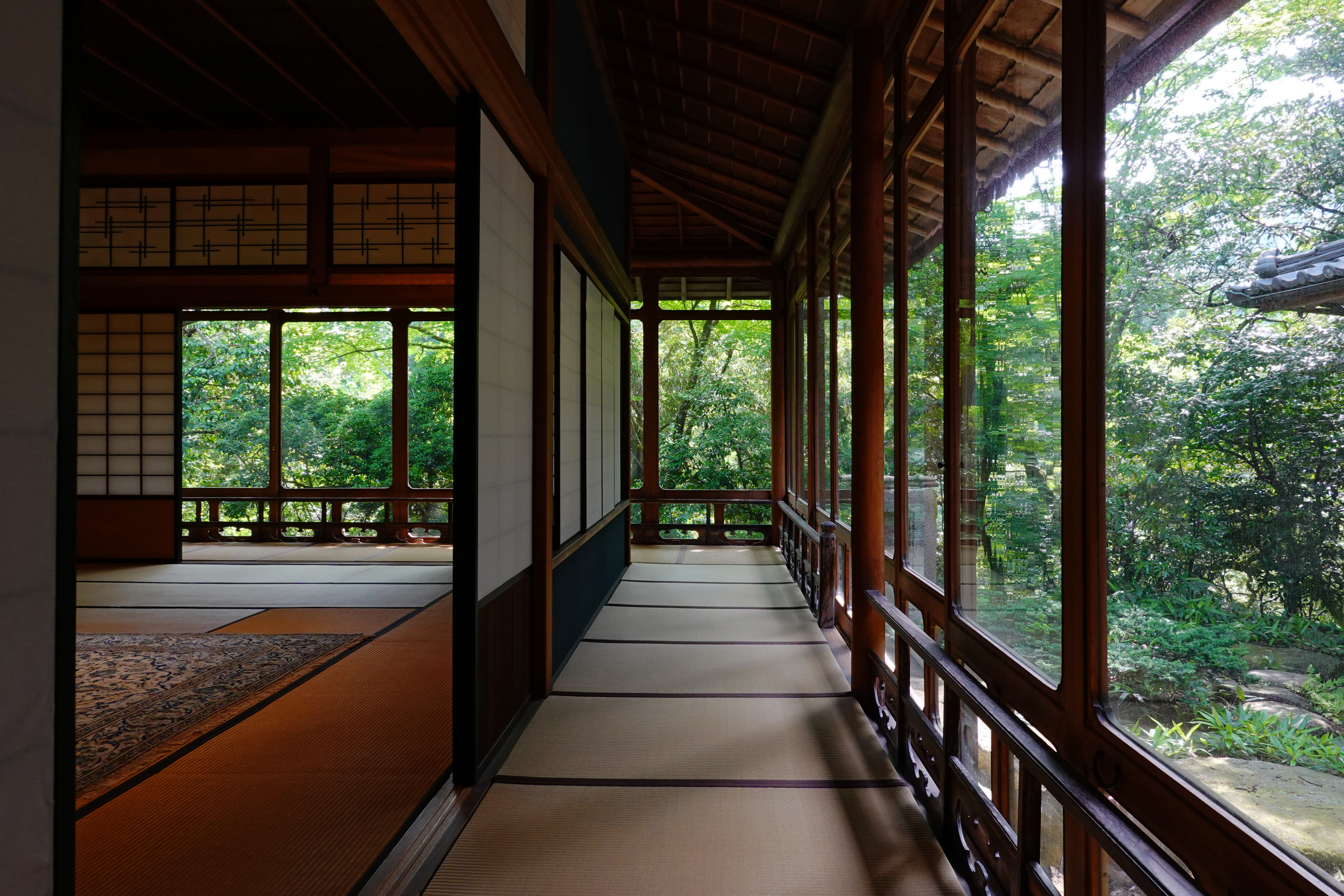
Mugenan Residence

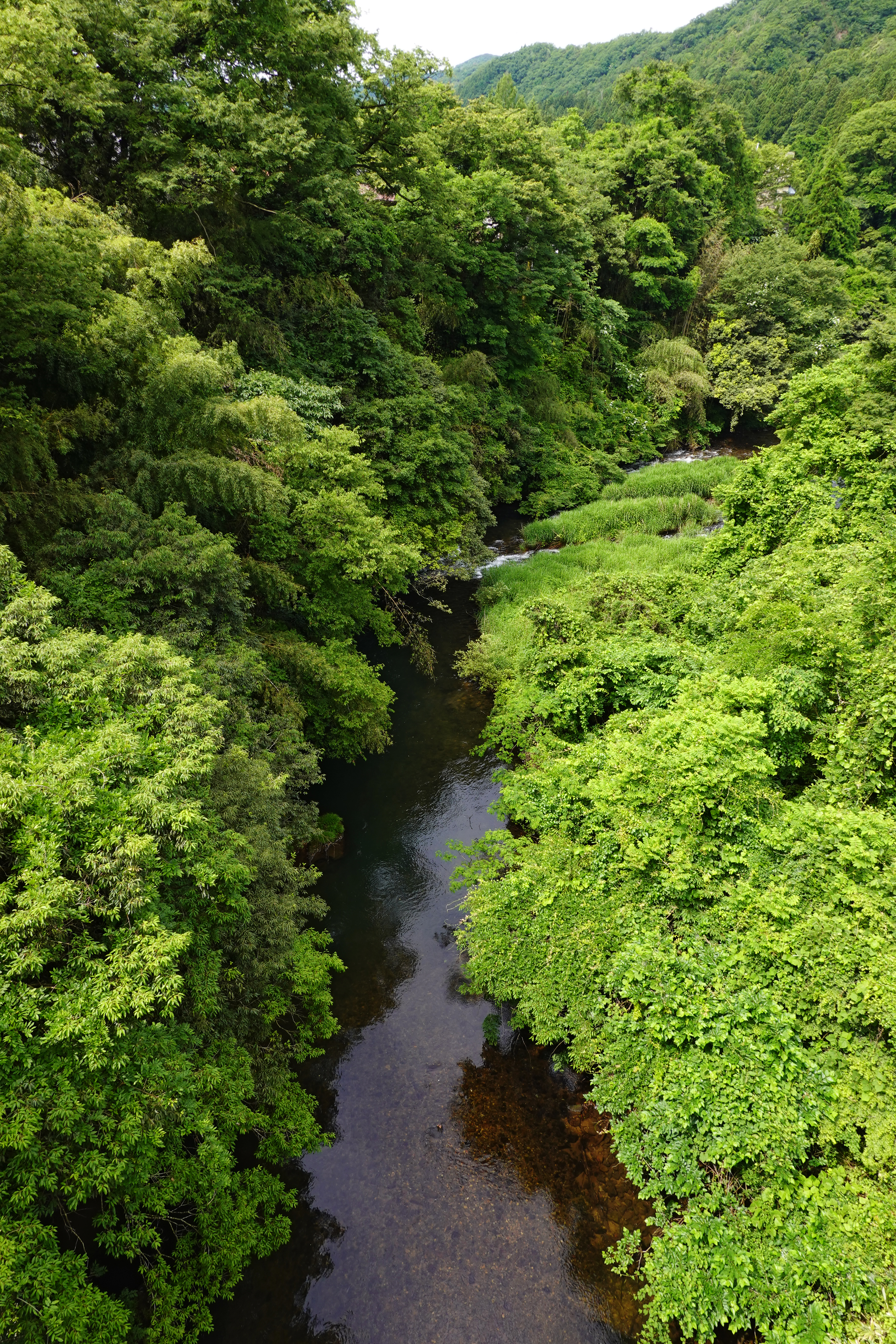
Daishoji River that runs the side of town

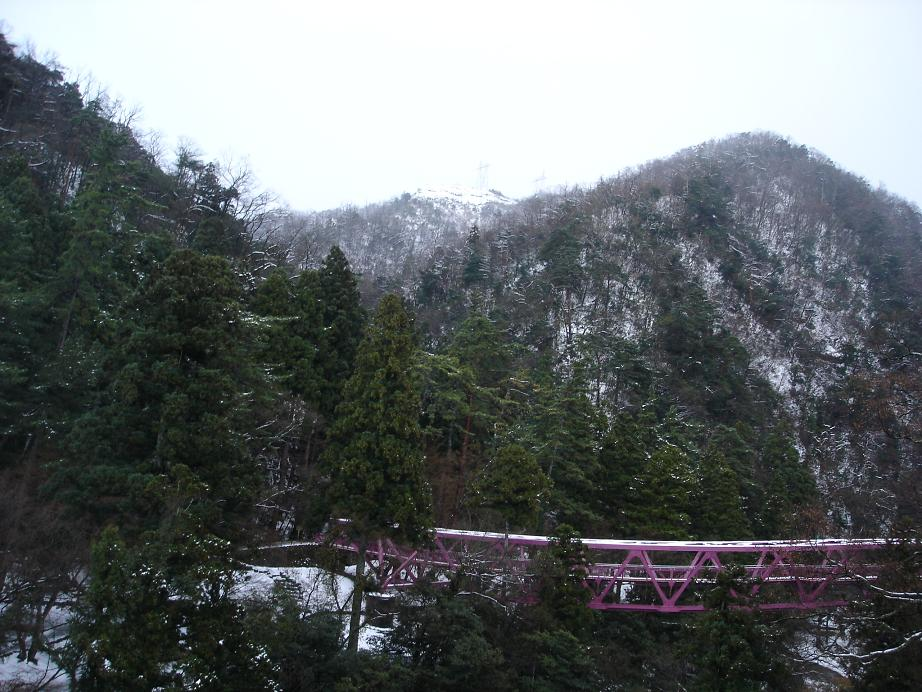
A famous bridge in Yamanaka onsen
