= Shumiya-Shinbutsuguten =

Japanese company

- Native name: 朱宮神仏具店
- Romanized name: Shu miya-shin butsugu-ten
- Founded: 1024; 1002 years ago
- Headquarters: Kōfu, Yamanashi Prefecture, Japan
- Products: Religious goods
- Website: https://www.shumiya.co.jp/

Shumiya-Shinbutsuguten (朱宮神仏具店; Shu miya-shin butsugu-ten) is a Japanese company that specializes in Buddhist goods, which is located in Kōfu, Yamanashi Prefecture, Japan. Founded in 1024, the company is one of the oldest still-operating companies.

== History ==
Shumiya-Shinbutsuguten was founded in 1024. Amongst the religious goods manufacturers in Japan, only Tanaka-Iga is older than Shumiya-Shinbutsuguten. The company specializes in manufacturing goods for Buddhist altars as well as kasaya, funeral-related products and tombstones.

== See also ==
- List of oldest companies
