= Maruya (company) =

- Native name: Maruya Hatcho Miso Co., Ltd.
- Industry: Food
- Founded: 1337
- Headquarters: 52-11 Oukan Dori, 444-0923 Okazaki, Aichi, Aichi Prefecture, Japan
- Website: www.8miso.co.jp/english.html

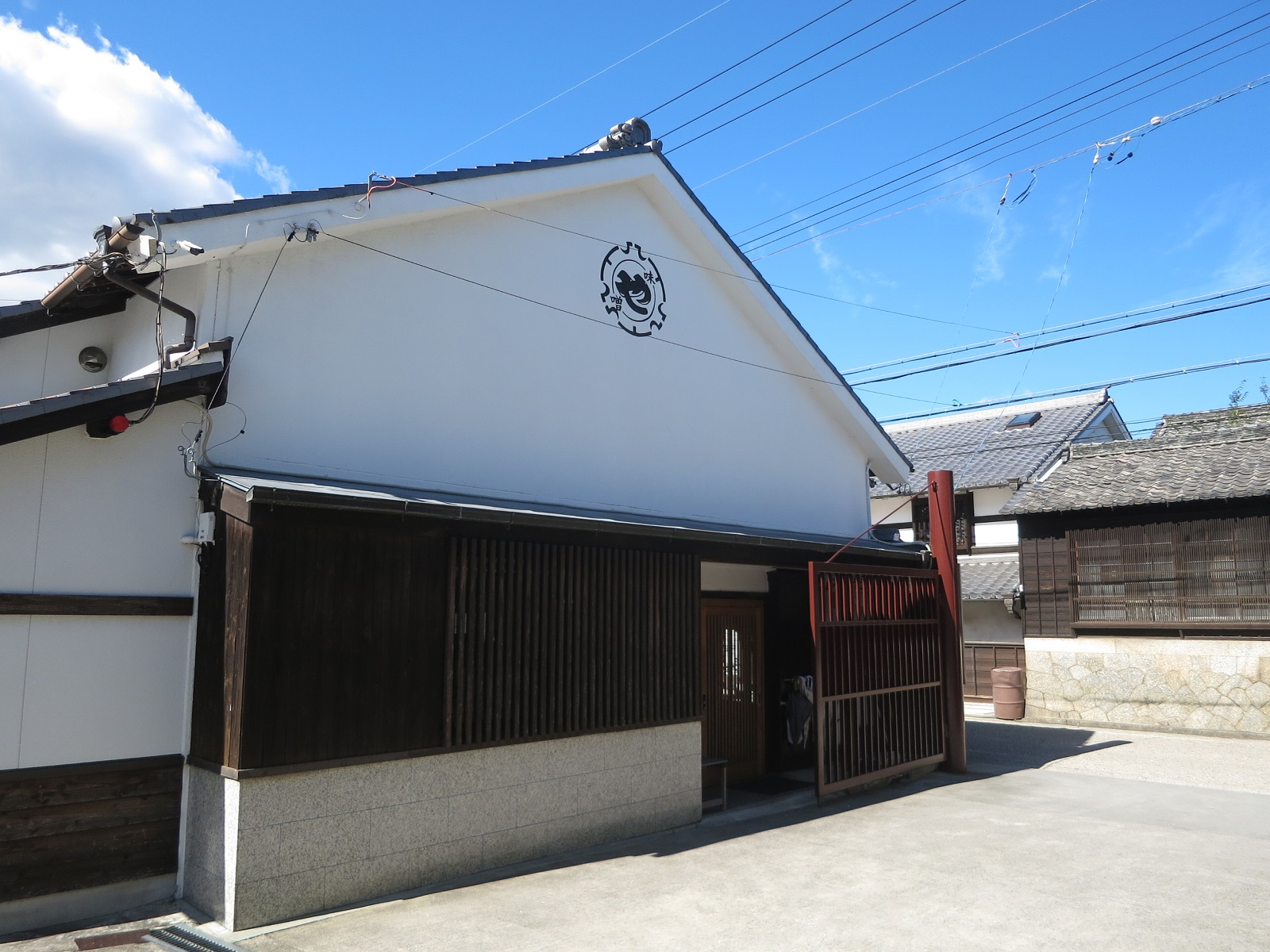
Company building

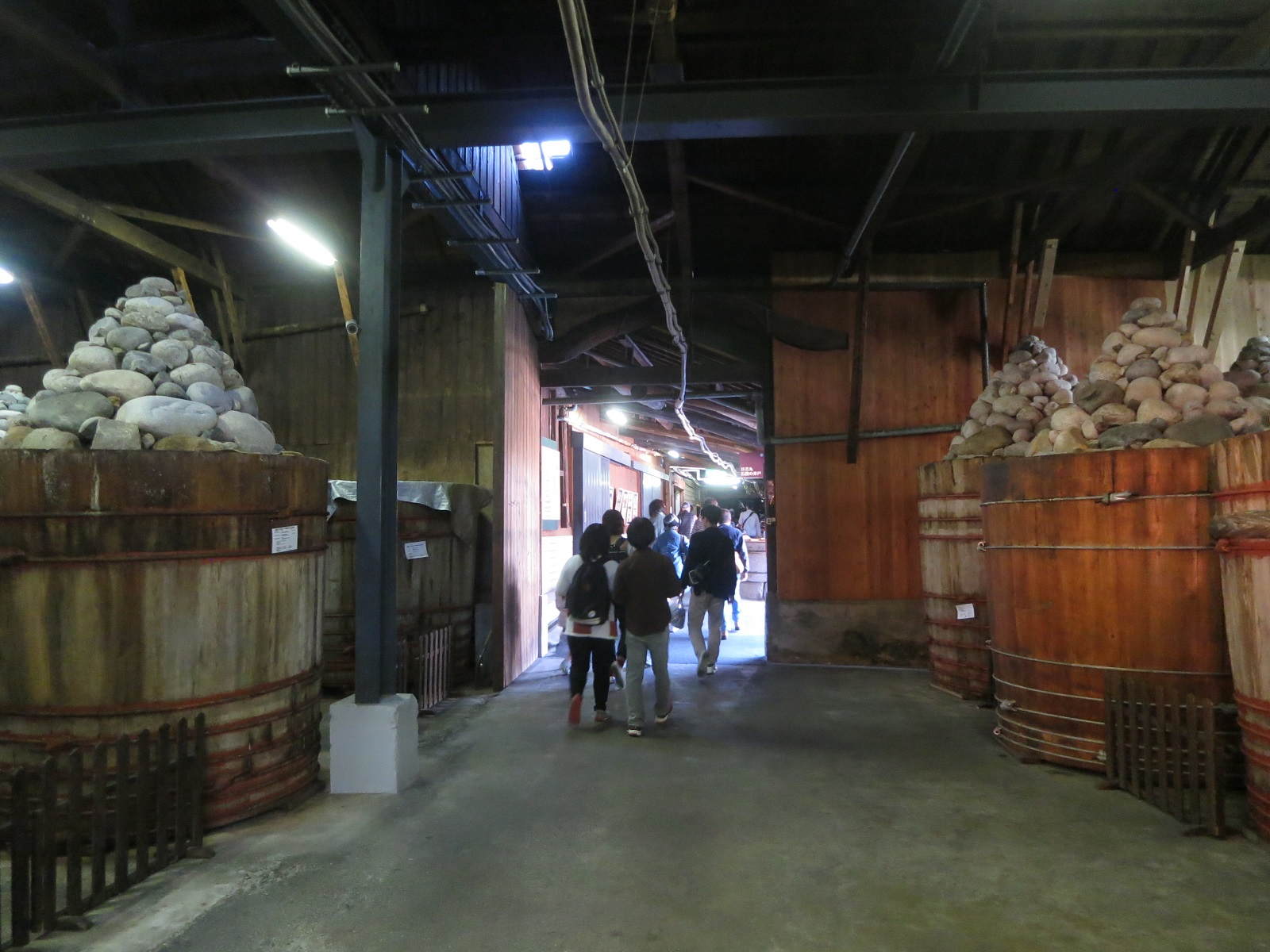
Interior of the company

Maruya is the oldest hatcho miso continuous producer in Japan founded in 1337. It is located in Okazaki city in Aichi Prefecture. The production of the miso bean paste is made using traditional methods and Maruya received the ISO:9001 certification. Hatcho miso is a type of red miso made using soy, renowned for its dense, rich flavour, and relatively low salt content compared with certain types of rice-based miso.

== See also ==
- List of oldest companies
