= Kikuoka Chinese Medicine =

Japanese shop

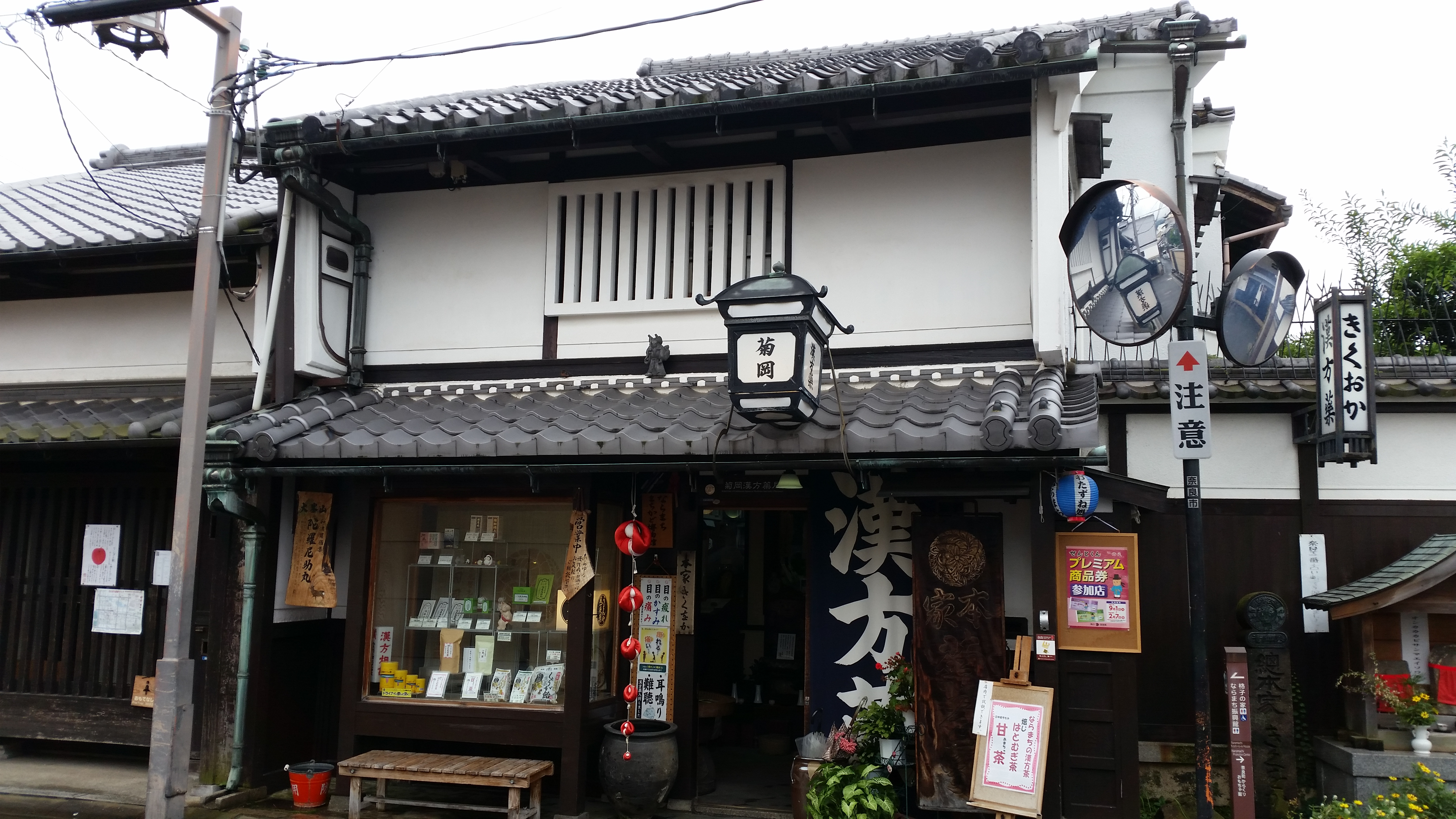
Kikuoka Chinese medicine shop in Nara

Kikuoka is a traditional Japanese shop with medicinal herbs, founded in 1184 and operated by the 24th generation of the same family. It is located in the historical city Nara in the Nara Prefecture, Japan.

== See also ==
- Plants used in traditional Chinese medicine
- List of oldest companies
