= Ryokan =

Traditional Japanese inn

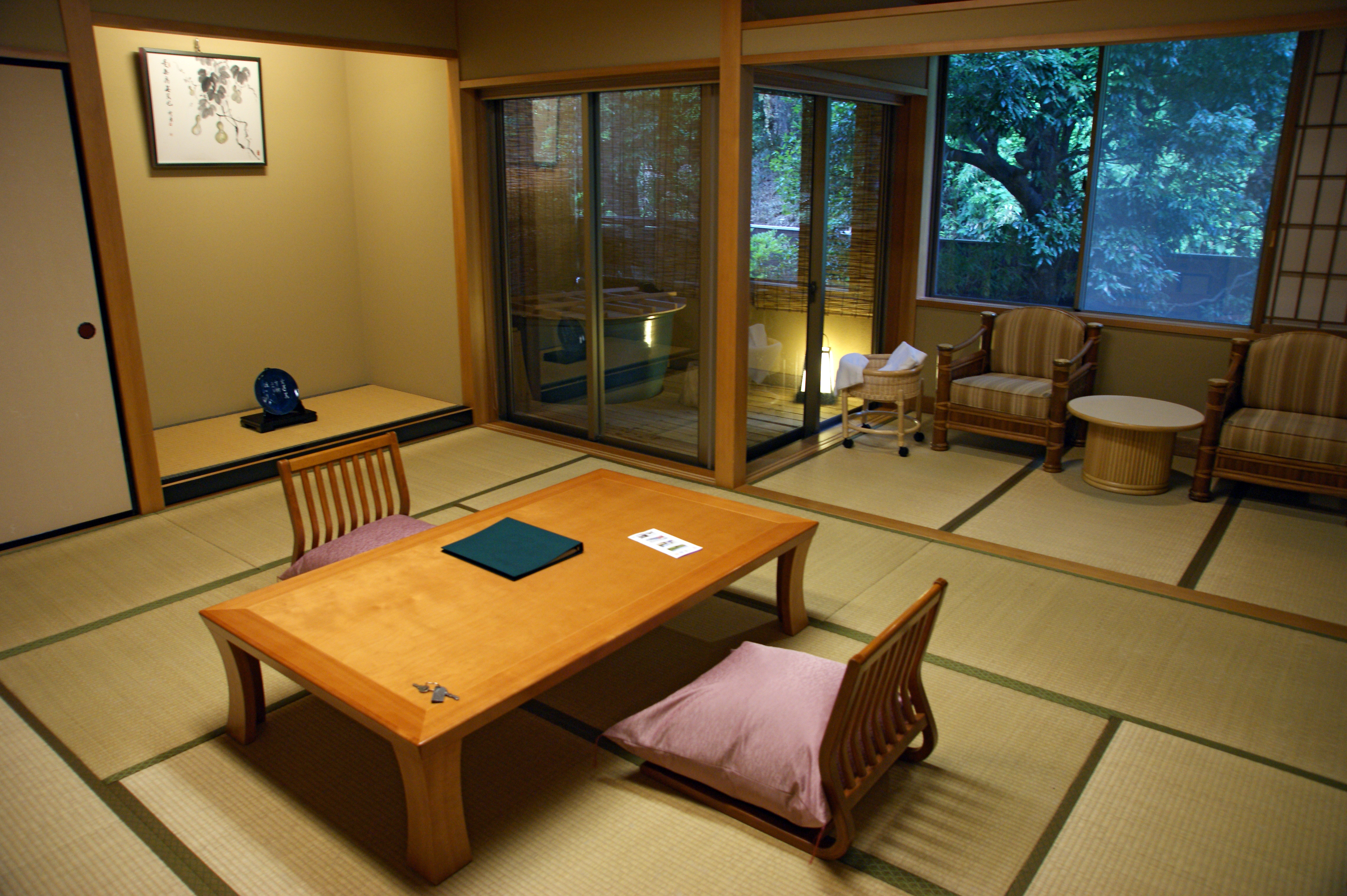
A room in the Tamatsukuri Onsen

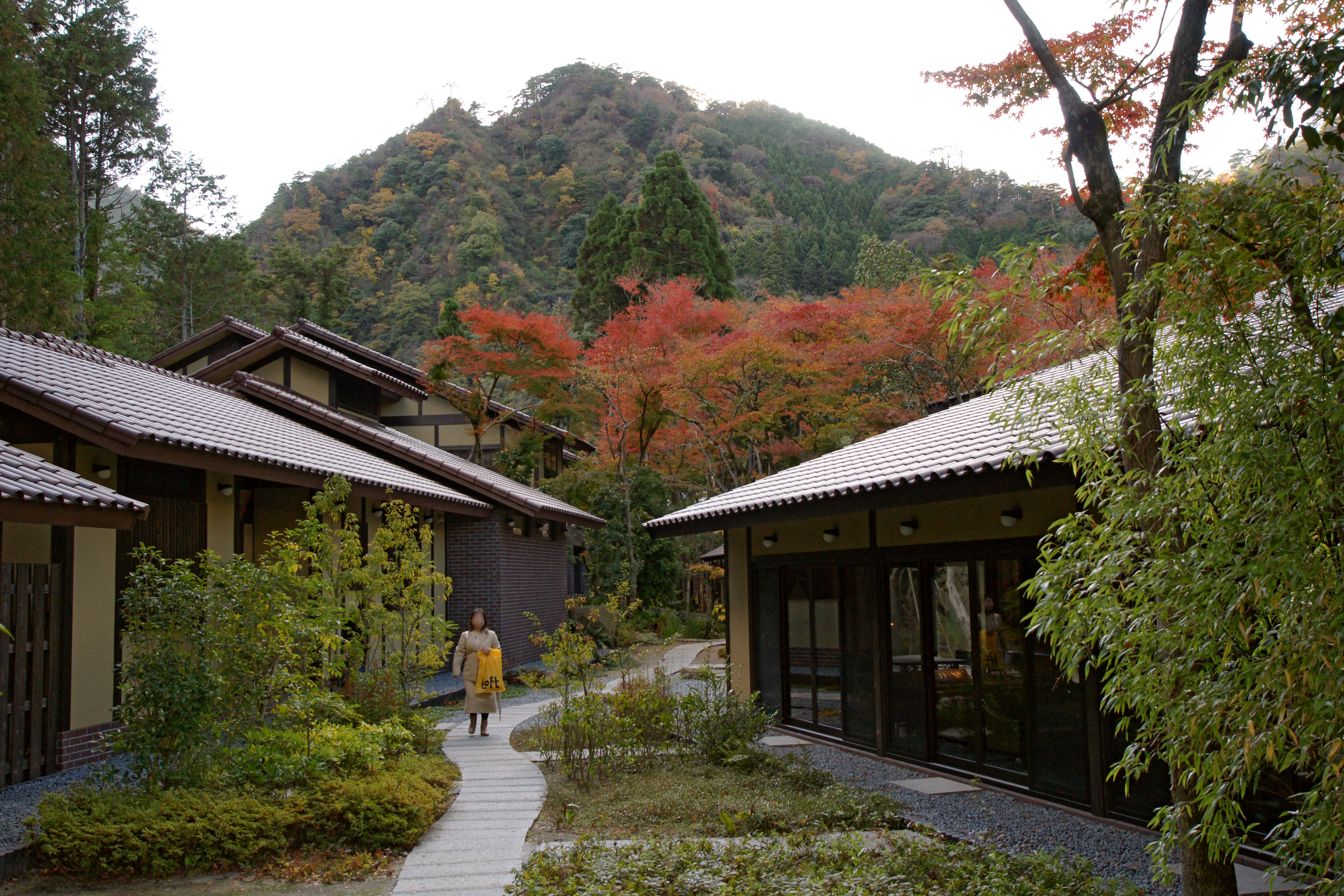
Ryokan (Arima Onsen)

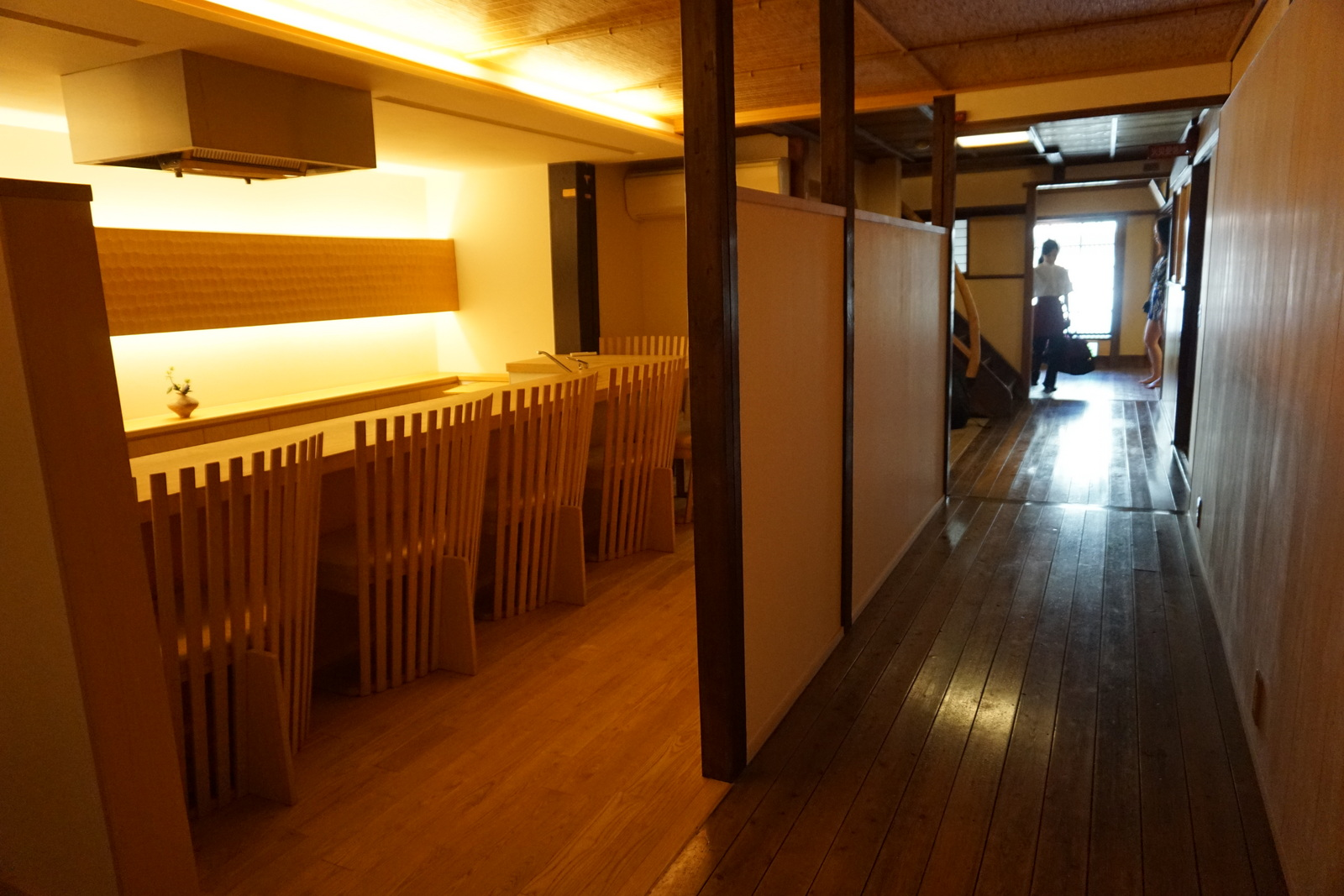
Ryokan interior, hallway

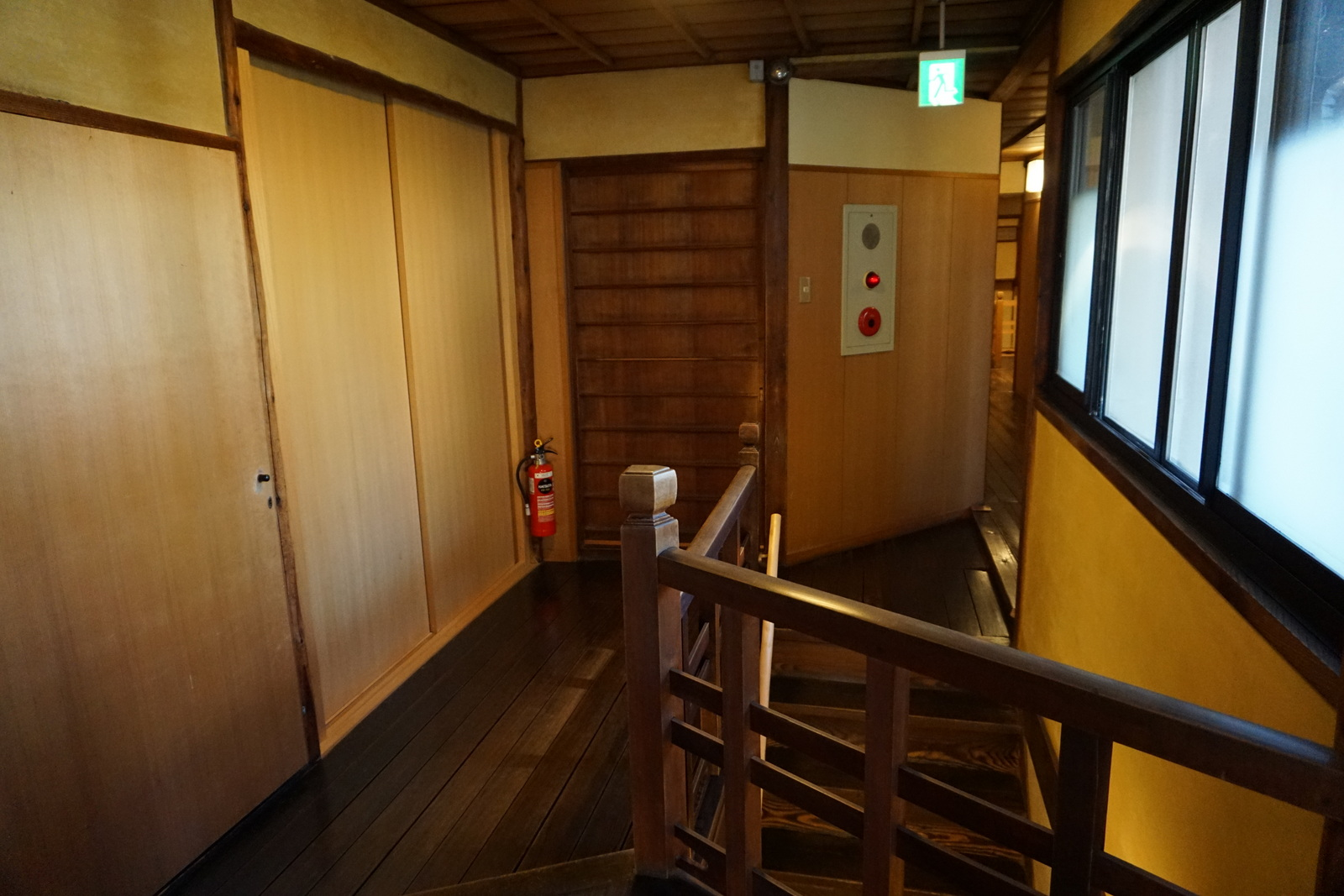
Ryokan interior, door and stairs

A ryokan (旅館; pronounced [ɾʲokaɴ]) (Note: "Ryokan" is both singular and plural in Japanese; this usage has carried over into English.) is a type of traditional Japanese inn that typically features tatami-matted rooms, communal baths, and other public areas where visitors may wear nemaki and talk with the owner. Ryokan have existed since the eighth century AD during the Keiun period, which is when the oldest hotel in the world, Nishiyama Onsen Keiunkan, was created in 705 AD. Another old ryokan called Hōshi Ryokan was founded in 718 AD and was also known as the world's second-oldest hotel. Such inns also served travelers along Japan's highways. The term "ryokan" originated in China, but by the Meiji era, it began to be used to refer to lodging facilities that were more luxurious than those that had existed previously.

Ryokan are hard to find in Tokyo and other large cities because many are often much more expensive compared with modern hotels and hostels. Although hotels have become standard in Japanese urban tourism, some major cities do offer ryokan with competitive rates. Traditional ryokan are more commonly found in areas with natural hot springs, and in recent years, many ryokan have been redeveloped to their original style, particularly by resort chains Hoshino Resorts, whose first ryokan opened in Karuizawa in 1914.

== Features ==
A typical ryokan has a relatively large entrance hall, with couches and chairs where guests can sit and talk; a modernized ryokan often has a television in the hall as well. Guest rooms are constructed using traditional Japanese methods: flooring is tatami, and doors are sliding doors. Even if the inn uses hinged doors for security, it usually opens into a small entranceway where guests can take off their shoes before stepping onto the tatami floor, which would be separated by a sliding door. Many ryokan rooms also feature a porch or balcony, also set off with a sliding door.

Almost all ryokan feature common bathing areas or ofuro, usually segregated by gender, using the water from a hot spring (onsen) if any are nearby. Areas with natural hot springs tend to attract high concentrations of ryokan. High-end ryokan may provide private bathing facilities as well. Typically ryokan provide guests with a yukata to wear; they might also have games such as table tennis, and possibly geta that visitors can borrow for strolls outside.

Bedding is a futon spread out on the tatami floor. When guests first enter their room, they usually find a table and some supplies for making tea. The table is also used for meals when guests take them in their room. While guests are out, staff (usually called nakai) will move the table aside and set out the futon.

== Meals ==
=== Traditional meal service ===
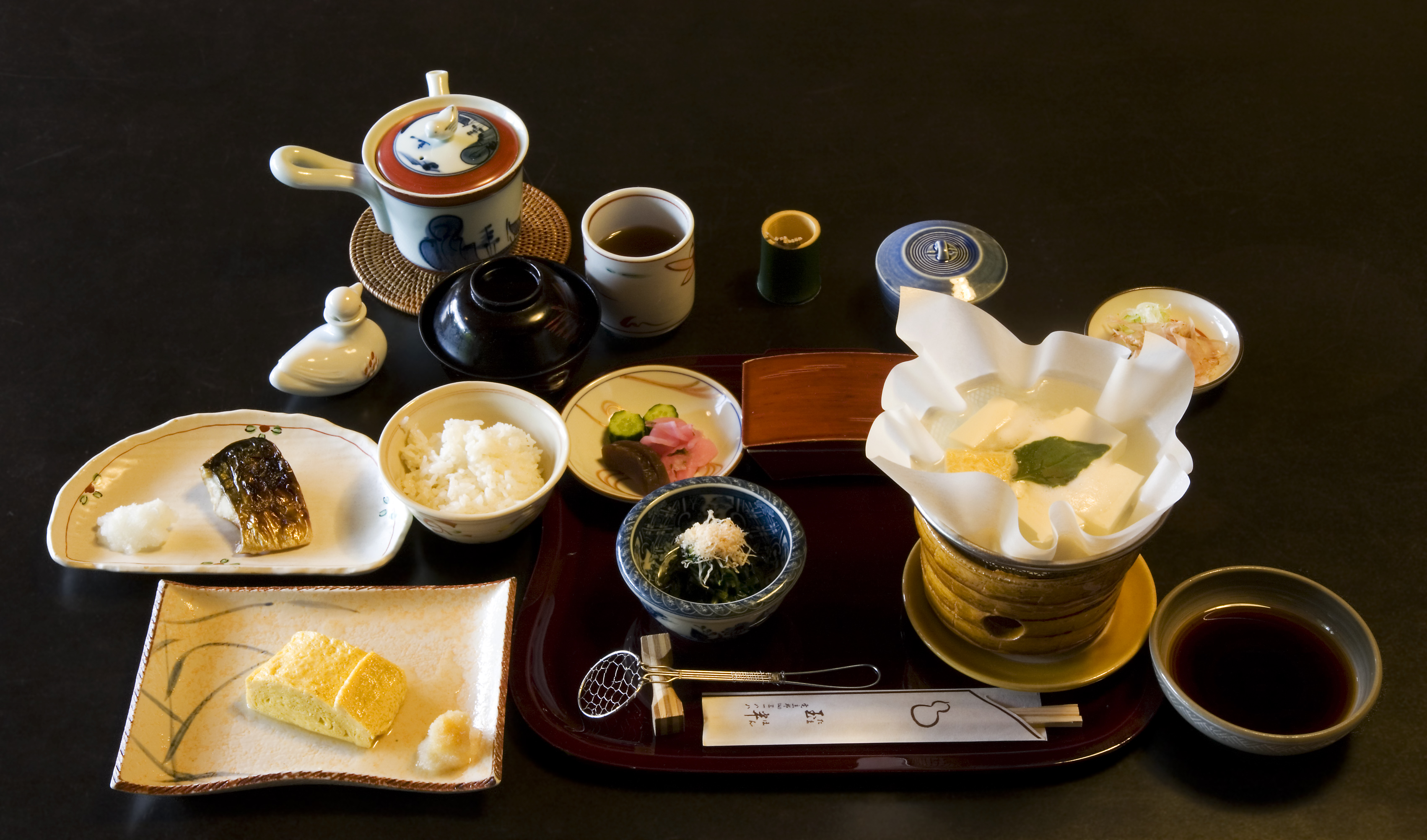
A traditional breakfast at a Kyoto ryokan

Most ryokan offer dinner and breakfast, which are often included in the price of the room. Most visitors take their meals at the ryokan, which usually promote themselves on the quality of their food. Meals typically consist of traditional Japanese cuisine known as kaiseki, which features seasonal and regional specialties. Kaiseki originally referred to light meals served during a tea ceremony, and today refers to a meal consisting of a number of small, varied dishes. Some ryokan instead serve local specialties such as basashi or food cooked in an irori hearth. So that each dish can be enjoyed at the proper temperature, ryokan stress that guests should be punctual for their meals. For this reason, most ryokan ask guests to confirm the time they want to take their meals.

Some ryokan have a communal dining area, but most serve meals in the guests' rooms. Ryokan that are likely to serve non-Japanese guests may also have a selection of Western food.

=== Trends since the 2010s ===
Since around 2017, the Japan Tourism Agency has encouraged ryokan to revise the traditional pricing model in which meals are included in the room rate. Instead, it has promoted separating accommodation fees from meal charges. This change is partly aimed at addressing issues faced by international guests. While many are familiar with Japanese fast food, they do not always enjoy the traditional and formal meals such as kaiseki that are commonly served at ryokan. By offering meals separately, guests have the option to choose from a variety of nearby restaurants according to their preferences. There have been instances where international guests refused the meals provided by the ryokan, left most of the food uneaten, or insisted on dining at nearby restaurants or convenience stores instead. In some cases, this has led to disputes when guests refused to pay the portion of the room rate attributed to meals.

With Japan experiencing a declining birthrate and aging population, many ryokan are dealing with chronic labor shortages. Additionally, the work style reform policies that have been gaining traction throughout Japanese society have made long working hours less acceptable in the hospitality industry. In response, some ryokan have decided to stop offering meals altogether in order to reduce the workload for both management and staff. This trend has been spreading across tourist destinations throughout Japan. In places such as Beppu Onsen, for example, many lodging facilities provide guests with maps introducing local restaurants. Some establishments have also launched campaigns encouraging guests to bring takeout meals from local eateries back to their accommodations.

== Minshuku ==
Minshuku (民宿)(ja) are a low-budget version of ryokan, roughly equivalent to a British boarding house or a bed and breakfast. The facilities are similar to a hotel or may simply consist of spare rooms in a family home. Minshuku often serve as the only type of accommodation in towns or villages too small to warrant a dedicated hotel or ryokan. The overall experience is much the same, but the food is simpler, dining may be optional and is often communal, rooms usually lack a private toilet, and guests may have to lay out their own bedding.

== See also ==
- Tourism in Japan
- Hōshi Ryokan
