= Kongō Gumi =

Japanese construction company

Kabushiki Gaisha Kongō Gumi 株式会社金剛組
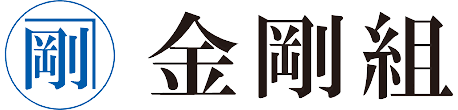
- Romanized name: Kongō Gumi
- Type: Subsidiary (since 2006)
- Traded as: TYO: 5578
- Industry: Construction
- Founded: 578; 1448 years ago
- Founder: Shigemitsu Kongō
- Headquarters: Osaka, Japan
- Parent: Takamatsu Construction Group (2006–present)
- Website: kongogumi.co.jp

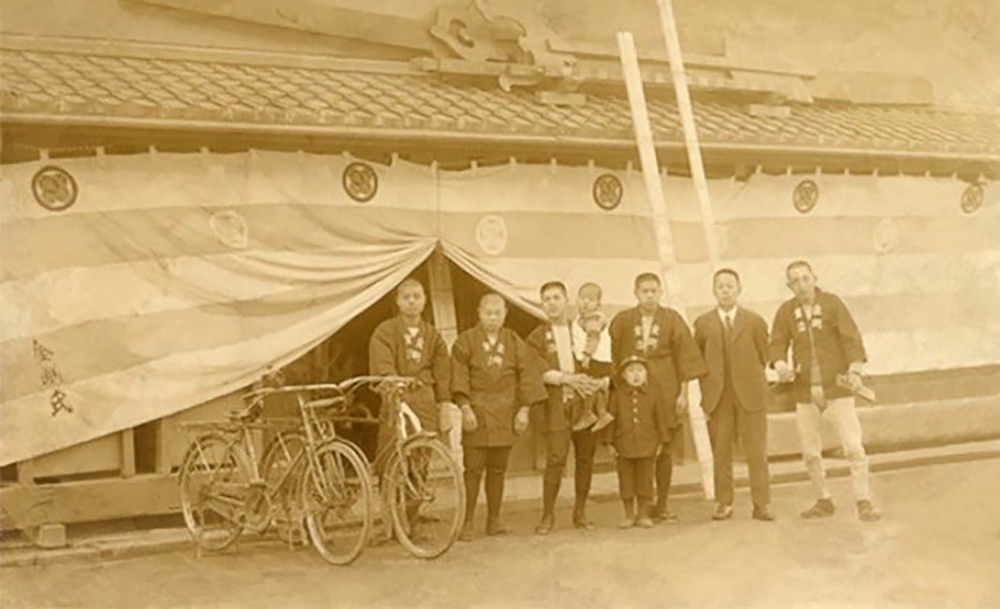
Kongō Yoshie, the 38th master carpenter of Kongō Gumi and employees

Kongō Gumi Co., Ltd. (株式会社金剛組, Kabushiki Gaisha Kongō Gumi) is a Japanese construction company that goes back to the 6th century. The company mainly worked on the design, construction, restoration, and repair of shrines, temples, castles, and cultural heritage buildings. While Kongō Gumi historically specialized in traditional architecture, increased competition from major construction companies due to the growing use of concrete in shrines and temples resulted in the company becoming a subsidiary of the Takamatsu Construction Group in January 2006. However, its continuity as a separate legal entity remains unbroken and uninterrupted.

== History ==
Headquartered in Osaka, Kongō Gumi was a family-owned carpenter guild, or kumi 組, in Japanese. A 3-metre-long (9.8 ft) 17th century scroll traces the 40 generations back to the company's start. It has continued operation through the founder's descendants. As with many distinguished Japanese families, sons-in-law often joined the clan and took the Kongō family name. This allowed the company to continue with the same name when there were no sons in a generation. Thus, through the years, the line has continued through either a son or a daughter. Another factor for the company's longevity is the Buddhist temple construction business, which has been a reliable mainstay due to millions of Buddhist adherents. Over the centuries, Kongō Gumi participated in the construction of many famous buildings, including the 16th century Osaka Castle.

Kongō Gumi was one of the first construction companies in Japan to use concrete with wood to build temples after the Meiji Restoration. They also pioneered the use of computer-aided design (CAD) for temple design.

By the early 2000s the company had trouble servicing its debts, and in January 2006 its assets were purchased by the Takamatsu Construction Group. Before the acquisition, Kongō Gumi had as few as 100 employees. In 2005 it had annual revenue of ¥7.5 billion (US$70 million), and it still specialized in building Buddhist temples. The last president was Masakazu Kongō, the 40th Kongō to lead the firm. As of December 2024, Kongō Gumi continues to operate as a wholly owned subsidiary of the Takamatsu Construction Group.

=== Timeline ===
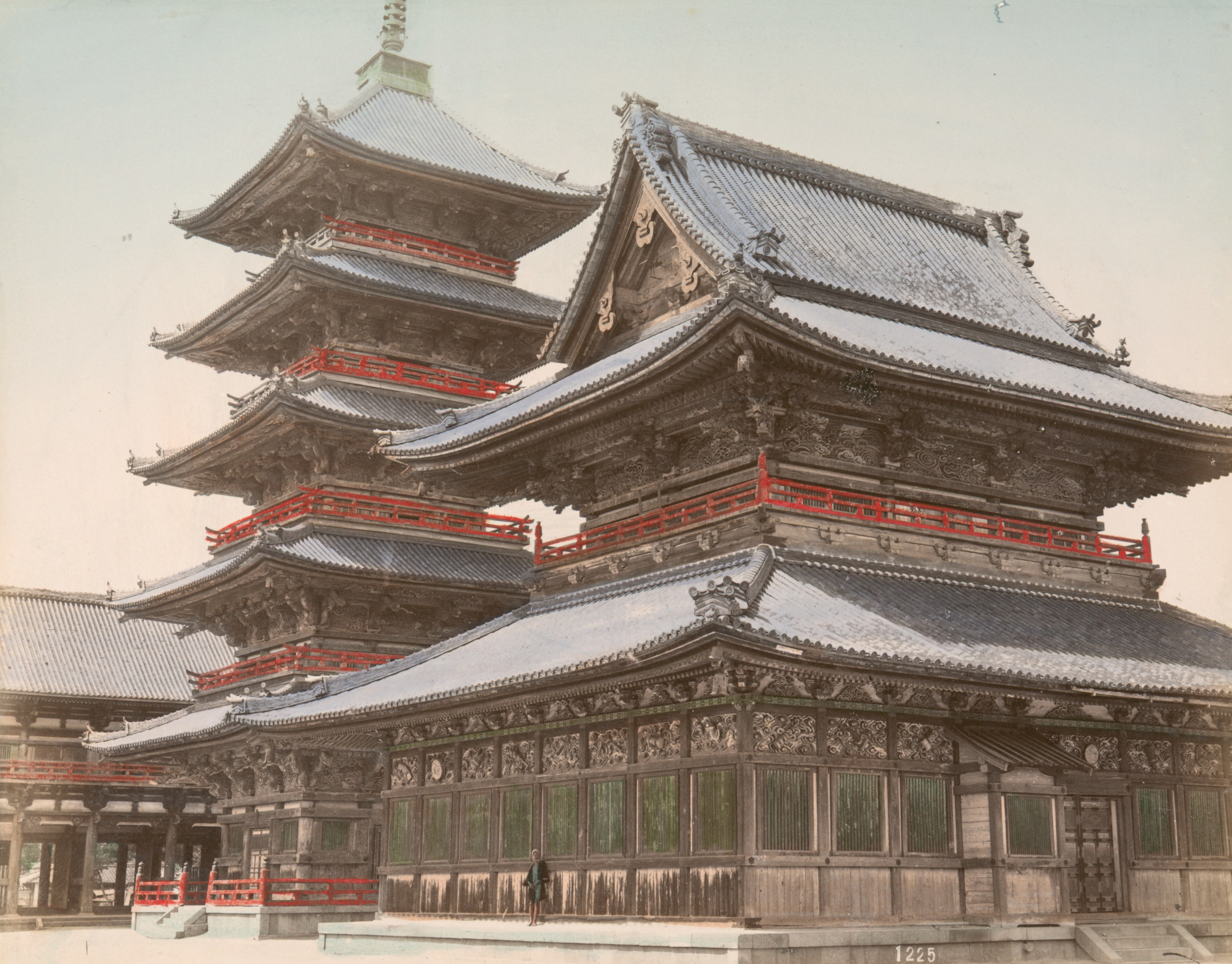
The Shitennō-ji complex around 1880, for which Kongō Gumi served as Miyadaiku for centuries

In 1903, Kongō Gumi built the Daimon Gate of the Shitennō-ji.

In 1934, the Shitennō-ji Gojū-no-tō (five-story pagoda) collapsed due to the 1934 Muroto typhoon. Kongō Gumi was able to rebuild it under the leadership of Yoshie Kongō, the first woman to become the head carpenter in the company's history.

In 1955, Kongō Gumi was incorporated.

In November 2005, Shin-Kongo Construction, a wholly owned subsidiary of Takamatsu Construction, was established.

In January 2006, the company transferred its business to Shin-Kongo Construction and most of its employees moved to the new company. The old Kongō Construction remained only in the real estate division and changed its name to KJ Construction Co., Ltd. The over-1,400-year-old Kongō family's management structure essentially closed its doors.

In July 2006, KJ Construction filed for bankruptcy due to insufficient funds. The total debt was ¥4 billion.

In July 2007, the company acquired all the shares of Nakamura Shaji, a company undergoing civil rehabilitation.

In May 2008, the company established Kongō Construction Engineering as a subsidiary specialized in the construction and repair of yamakasa, danjiri, and mikoshi (floats and portable shrines used in festivals).

== See also ==
- List of oldest companies
