= Shitennō-ji =

Buddhist temple in Ōsaka, Japan

Arahakasan Shitennō-ji
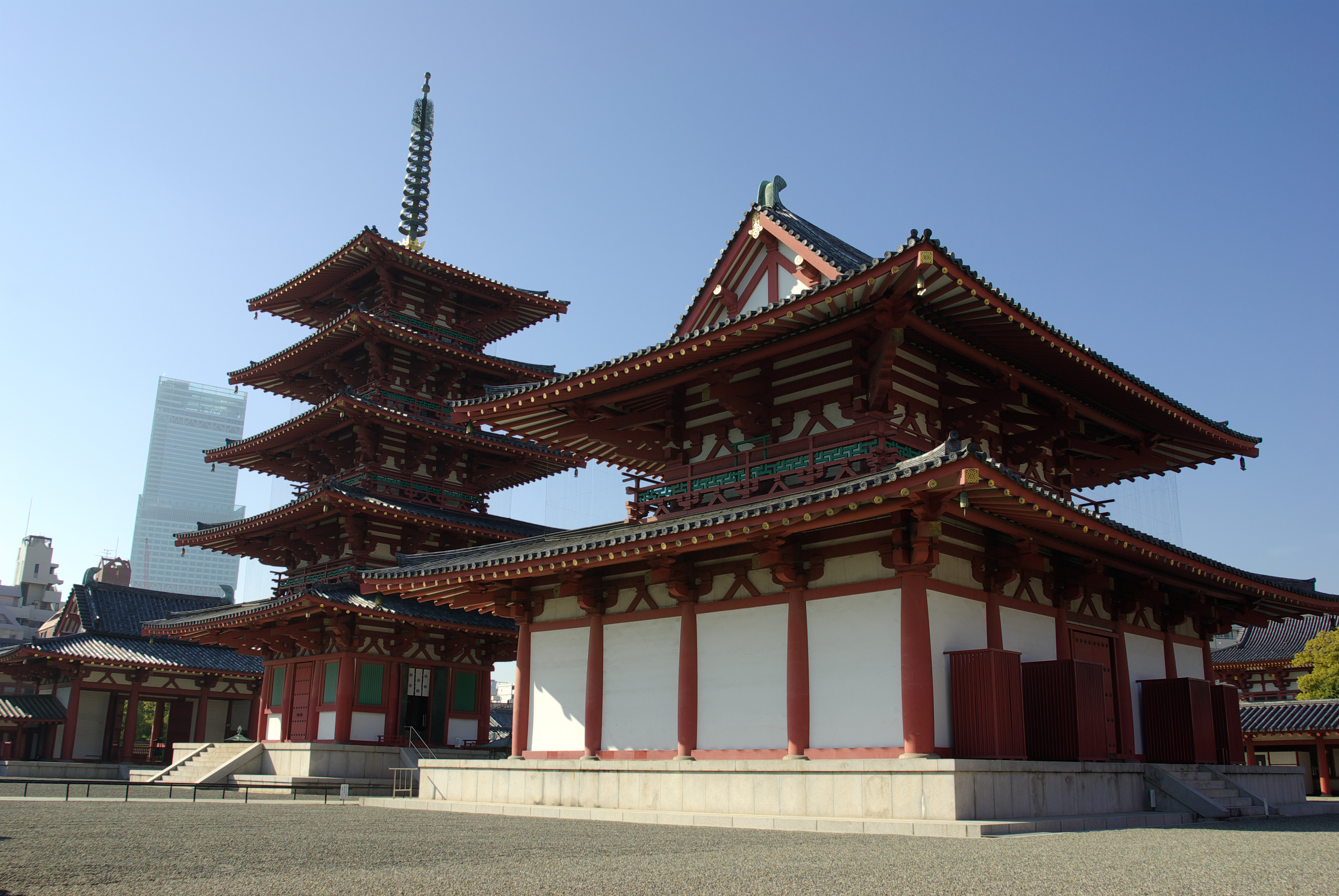
- Chushin garan (中心伽藍)

Religion
- Affiliation: Wa-shū
- Prefecture: Osaka-fu
- Deity: Kannon (Avalokiteśvara)

Location
- Location: 1-1-18 Shitennō-ji
- Municipality: Tennōji-ku, Osaka
- Country: Japan
- Interactive map of Arahakasan Shitennō-ji
- Prefecture: Osaka-fu
- Coordinates: 34°39′14.04″N 135°30′59.22″E

Architecture
- Founder: Prince Shōtoku
- General contractor: Kongō Gumi
- Established: 593
- Completed: 1963 (reconstruction)

Website
- shitennoji.or.jp

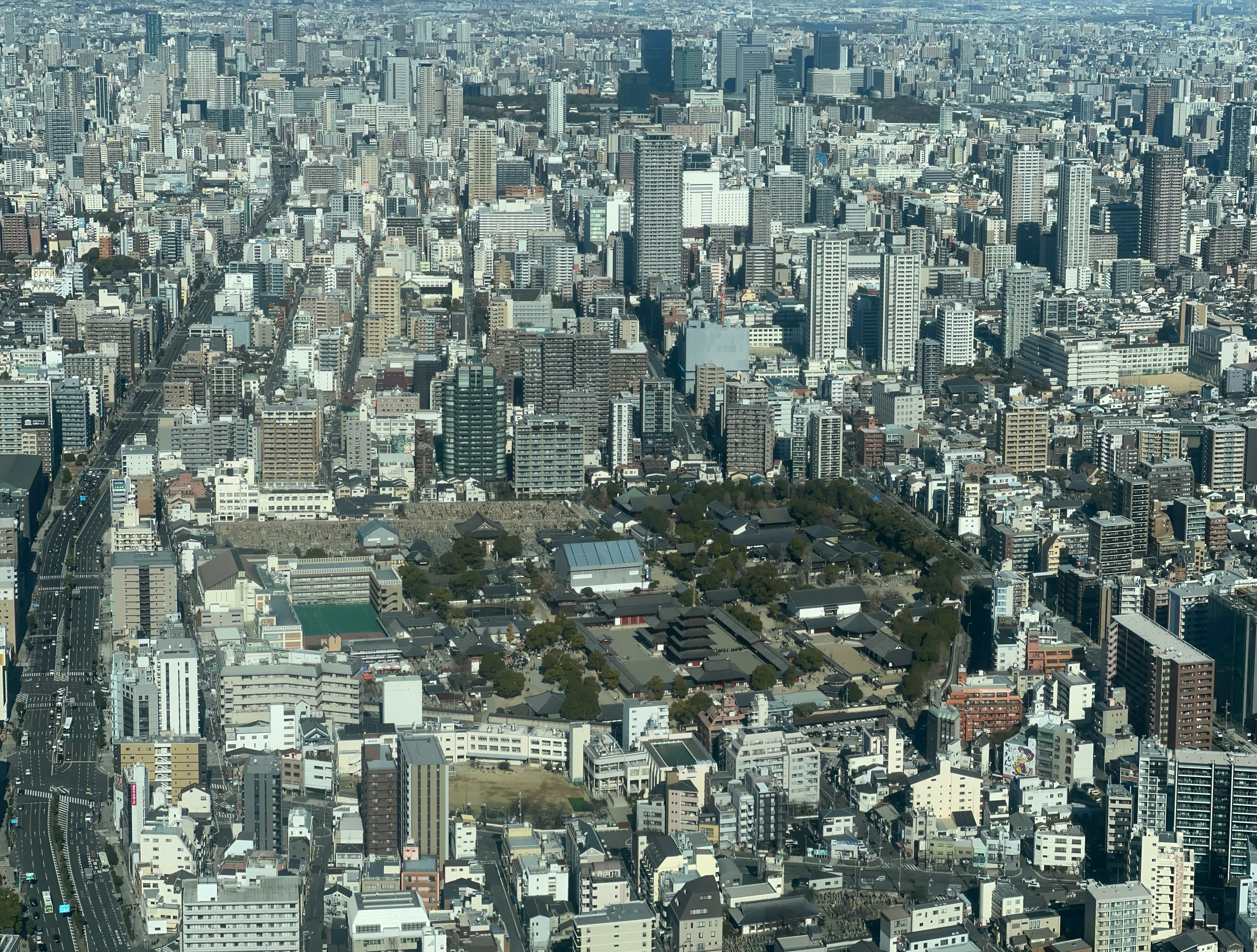
Shitennō-ji seen from above (center) in the middle of Ōsaka, 2025

Shitennō-ji (Japanese: 四天王寺, Temple of the Four Heavenly Kings) is a Buddhist temple in Ōsaka, Japan. It is also known as Arahaka-ji (荒陵寺), Nanba-ji/Naniwa-daiji (難波大寺), or Mitsu-ji 御津寺. The temple is sometimes regarded as the first Buddhist and oldest officially administered temple in Japan, although the temple complex and buildings have been rebuilt over the centuries, with the last reconstruction taking place in 1963. Shortly after World War II, Shitennō-ji became independent of the parent Tendai sect and formed the Wa sect (Wa-shū, 和宗) of Buddhism.

== History ==
Prince Shōtoku was known for his profound Buddhist faith when Buddhism was not widespread in Japan during the 6th century. In order to popularize Buddhism, Prince Shōtoku led a national project to promote Buddhism and he commissioned the construction of Shitennō-ji. Prince Shōtoku invited three Korean carpenters from Baekje that brought knowledge and led the construction of Shitennō-ji. The commission of Shitennō-ji was part of a massive national project led by Prince Shōtoku.

The temple buildings themselves have been rebuilt a few times over the centuries; most of the present structures are from when the temple was last completely rebuilt in 1963. One of the members involved in the initial construction of the temple in the 6th century later established the firm Kongō Gumi, which specialized in temple and shrine buildings. Kongō Gumi was the world's oldest company until it was acquired by the Takamatsu Construction Group in 2004.

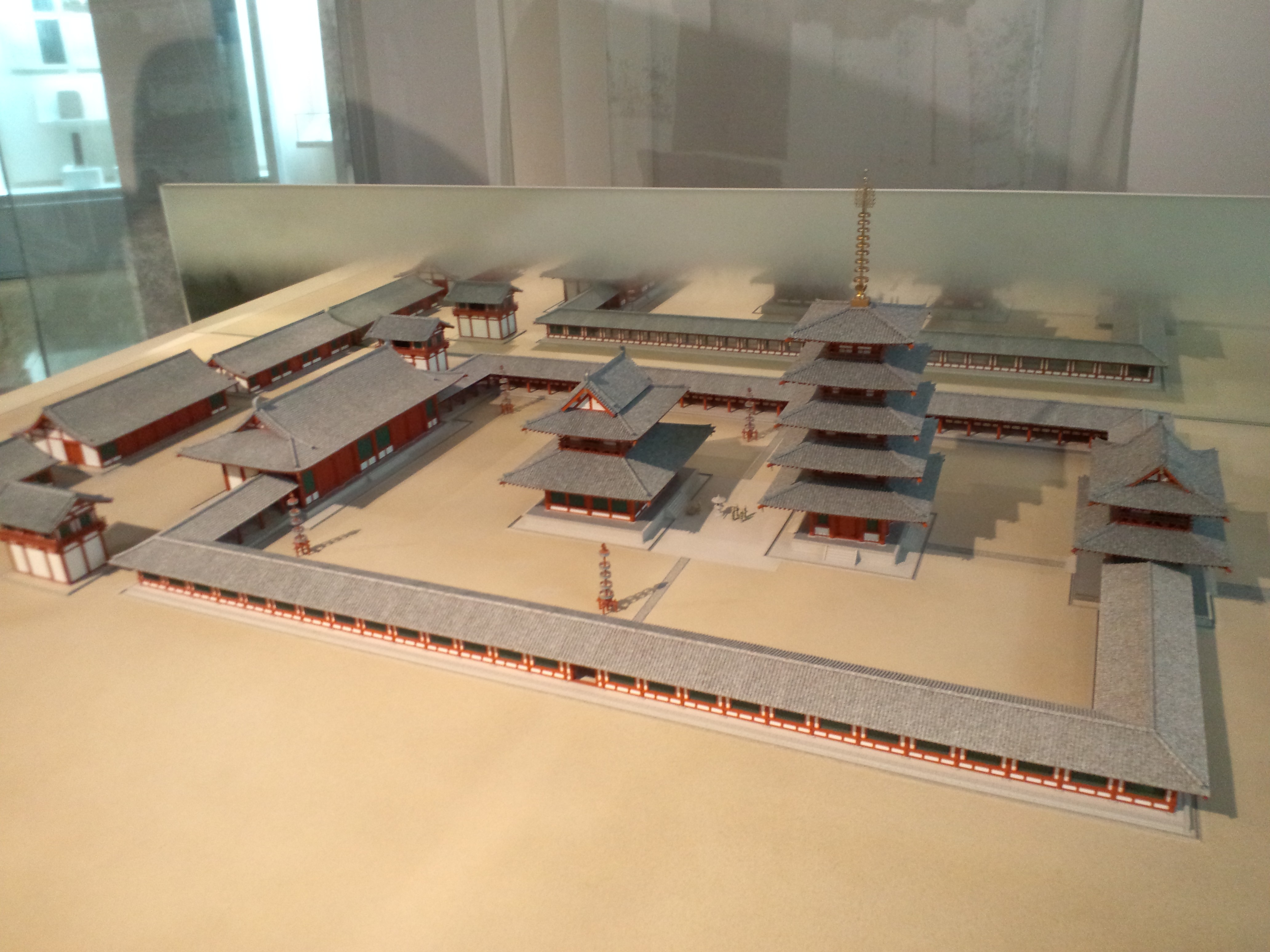
Model of the temple complex at the time of its construction, at Osaka Prefectural Chikatsu Asuka Museum

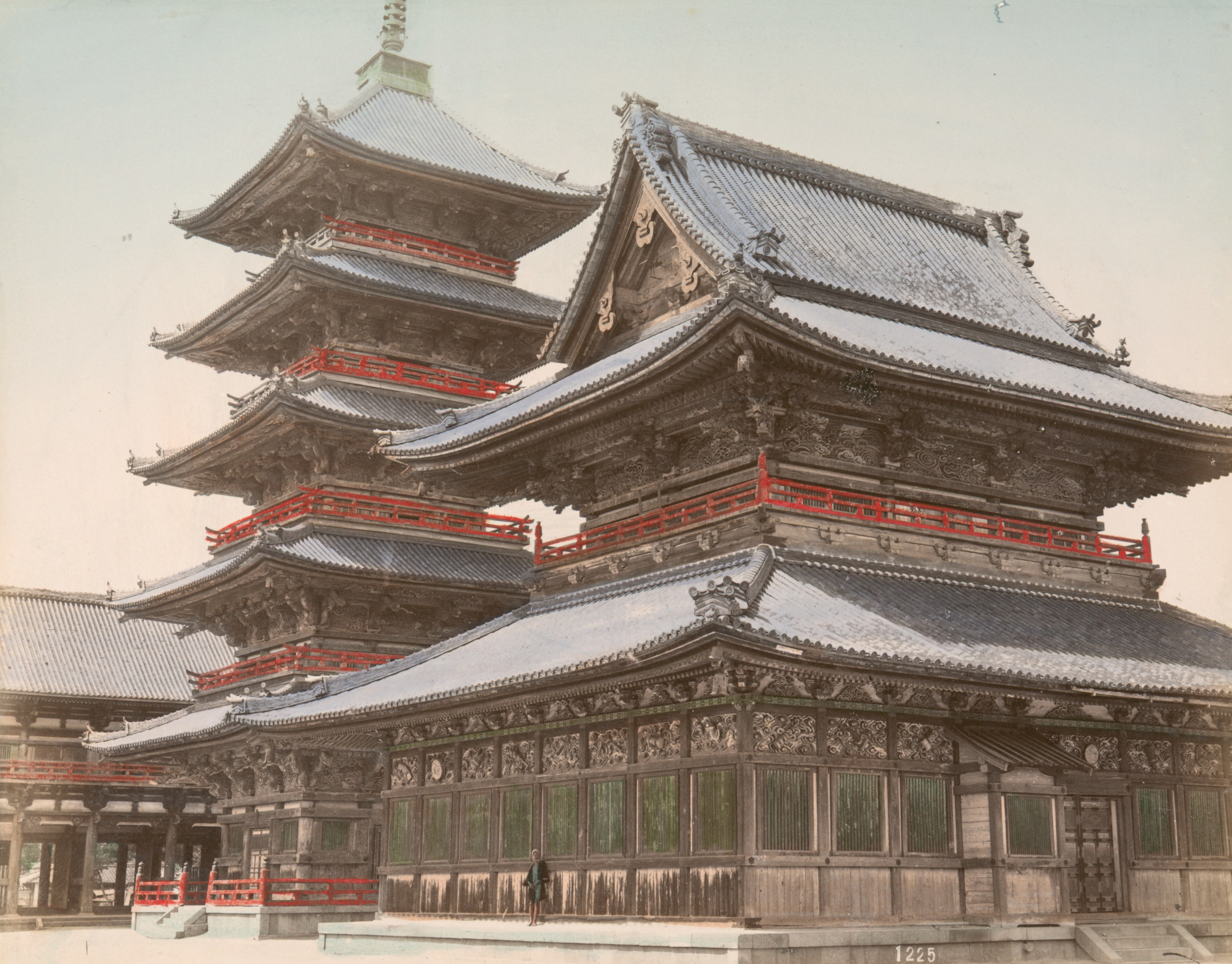
Tinted photo of the larger main hall and pagoda around 1880, prior to the downscaled modern reconstruction. Taken by Kusakabe Kimbei.

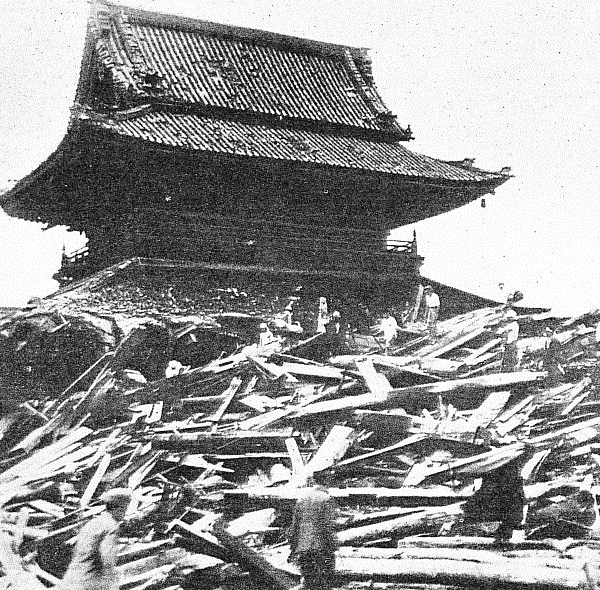
The rubble of the five-tiered pagoda after destruction by the 1934 Muroto typhoon

== Description ==
"Shitennō" refer to the Four Heavenly Kings in Buddhism. The temple Prince Shōtoku built to honor them had four institutions, each to help the Japanese attain a higher level of civilization. This Shika-in (四箇院, Four Institutions) was centered on the seven-building garan (伽藍) (the complex inside the walls), and included a Kyōden-in (Institution of Religion and Education), a Hiden-in (welfare Institution), a Ryōbyō-in (hospital), and a Seiyaku-in (pharmacy) to provide essential care to the people of Japan. Three of the four sections are known to have existed inside the temple in the Kamakura period.

The garan consists of a five-story pagoda, a main Golden Pavilion (Kondō) housing an image of the Bodhisattva Kannon, and a Kōdō (Lecture Hall) under a covered corridor holding three gates; the Deva Gate (仁王門, Niōmon) (also known as the chūmon (中門)), the Western Gate, and the Eastern Gate. Surrounding this central complex are the Great South Gate (Nandaimon), and a Great East Gate (Higashi-no-ō'mon). To the west is the Great West Gate (Nishi-no-ō'mon), also known as Gokuraku-mon (極楽門). Further to the west is a stone torii, which is imagined to be the Eastern Gate to Sukhavati, the Pure Land of the West.

In the Kameido hall is a 7th-century turtle-shaped stonework that was used for state rituals with water. These are 2 turtle-shaped objects in opposite direction. The stone tank and upper turtle's base were carved from single pieces of Tatsuyama stone. These are similar to the carving at the Sakafuneishi ruins which are believed to be a ritual site for Empress Kōgyoku (594–661) in Asuka, Nara Prefecture. Nowadays they are still used for rituals to commemorate ancestors by floating sheets of wood with their names on the water.

Souvenirs of Shitennō-ji are sold on the 21st of each month.

== Directions ==
- a 5-minute walk from Shitennoji-mae Yuhigaoka Station on the Osaka Municipal Subway Tanimachi Line
- a 15-minute walk from Tennoji Station on the JR West Lines and the Osaka Municipal Subway Lines
- a 15-minute walk from Osaka Abenobashi Station on the Kintetsu Minami-Osaka Line

== Gallery ==
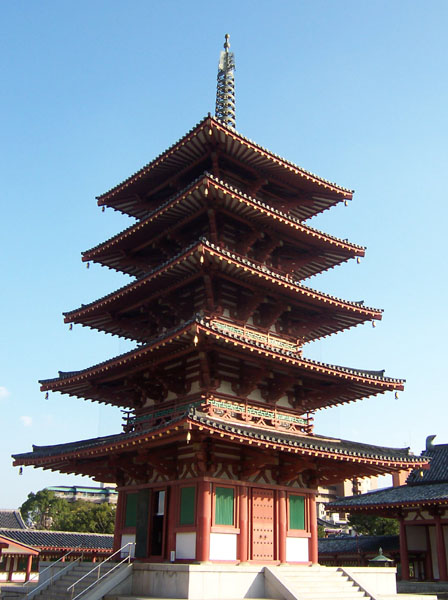
Shitennō-ji pagoda

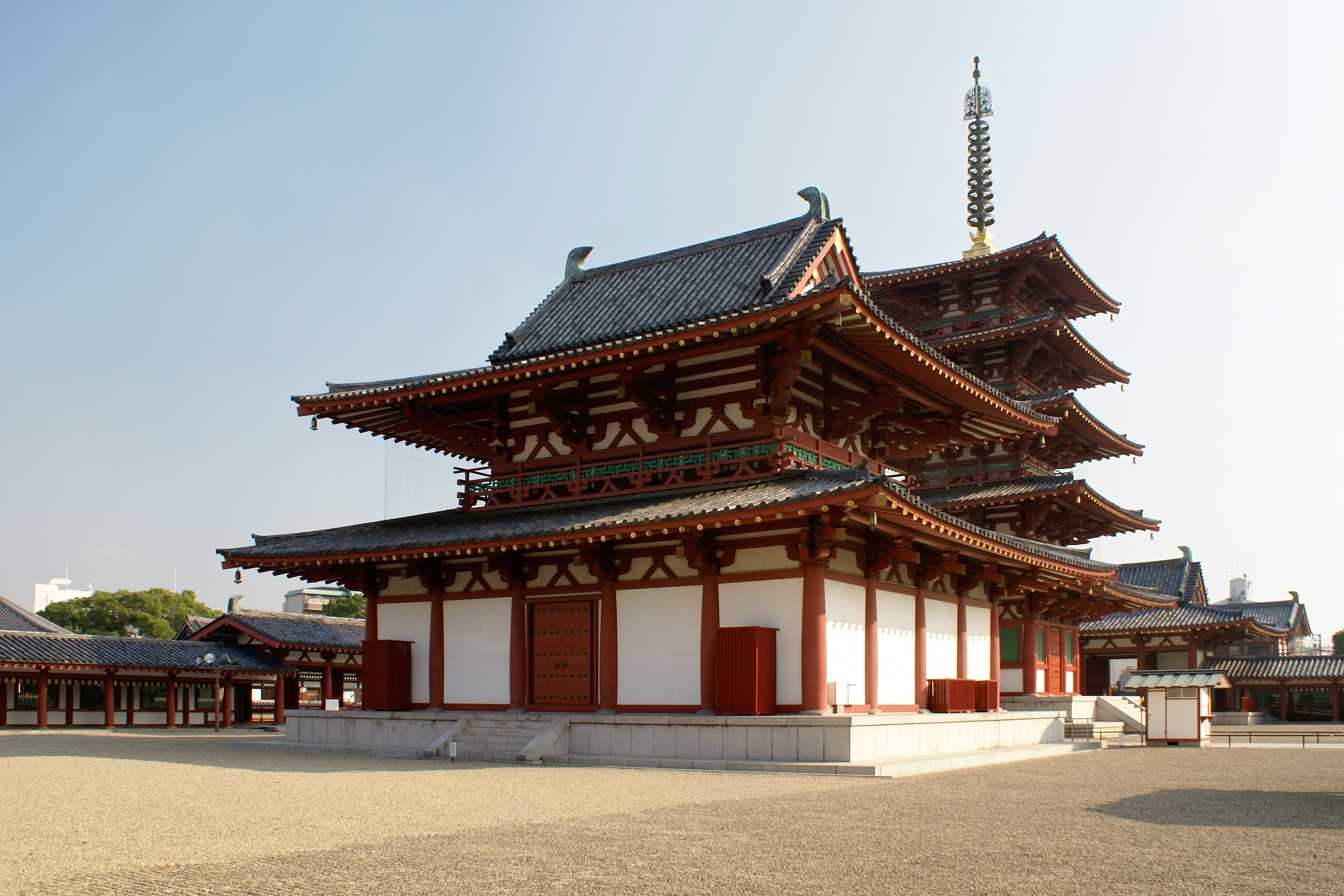
Kondō

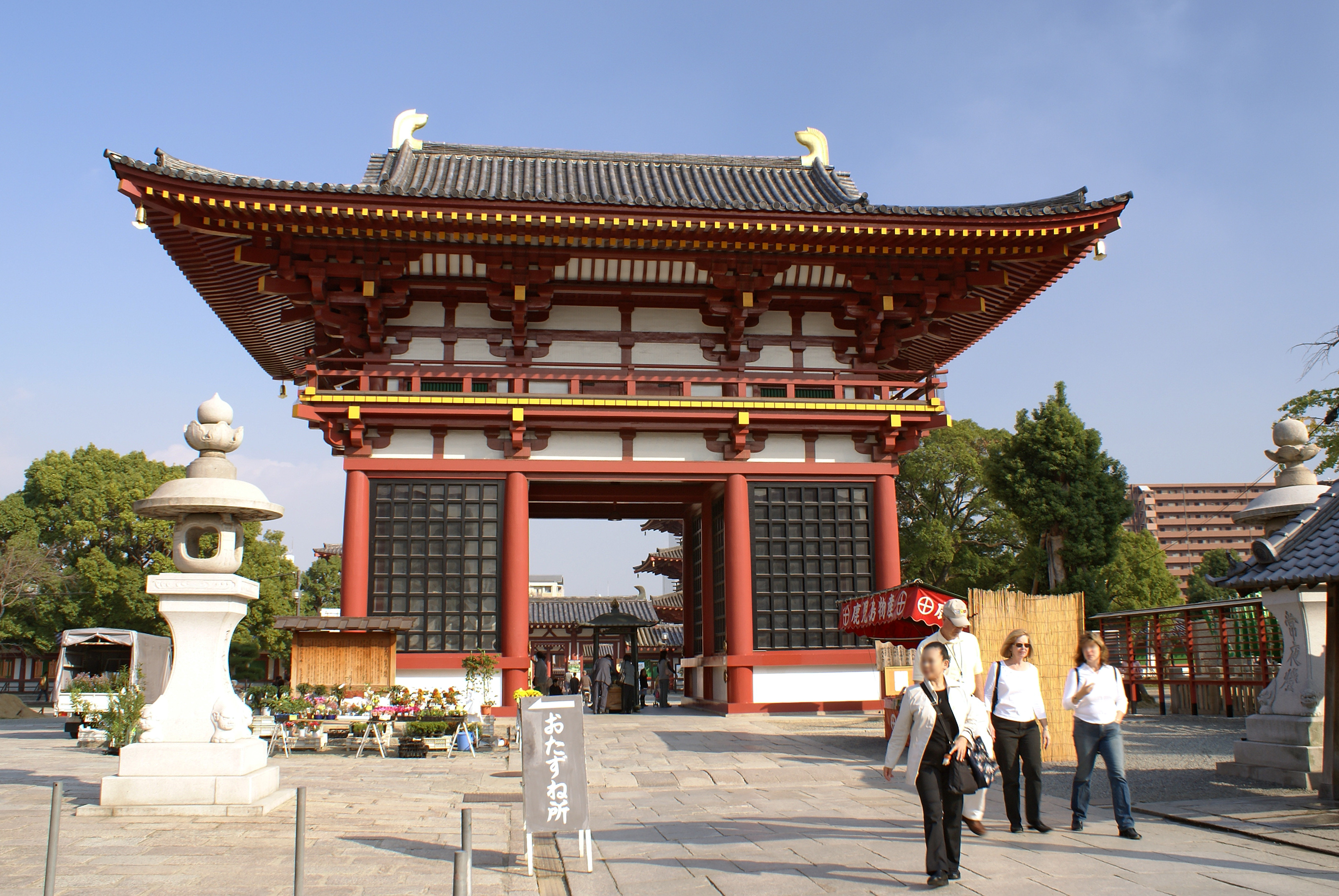
The Great West Gate (Gokuraku-mon)

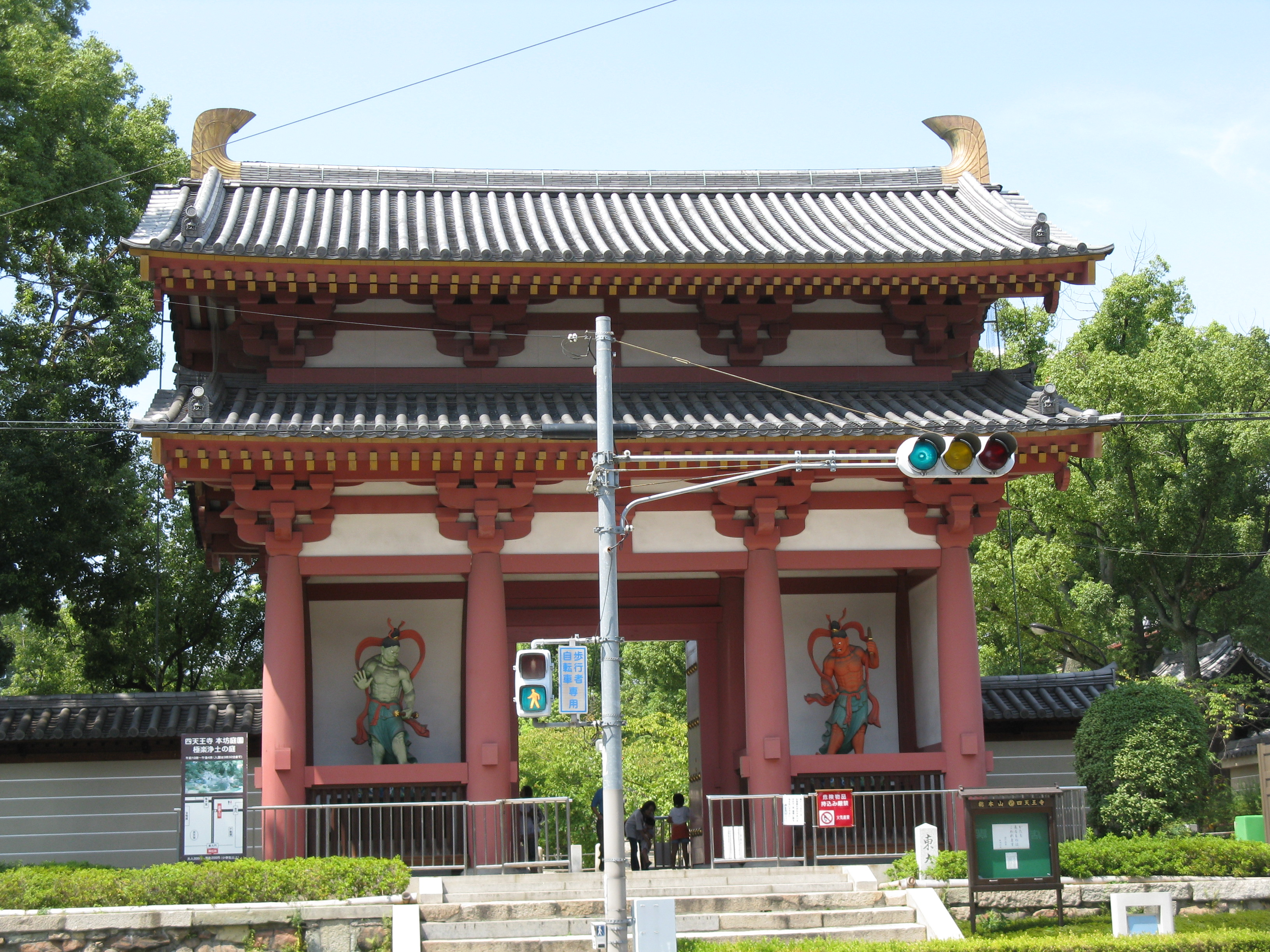
The Great East Gate

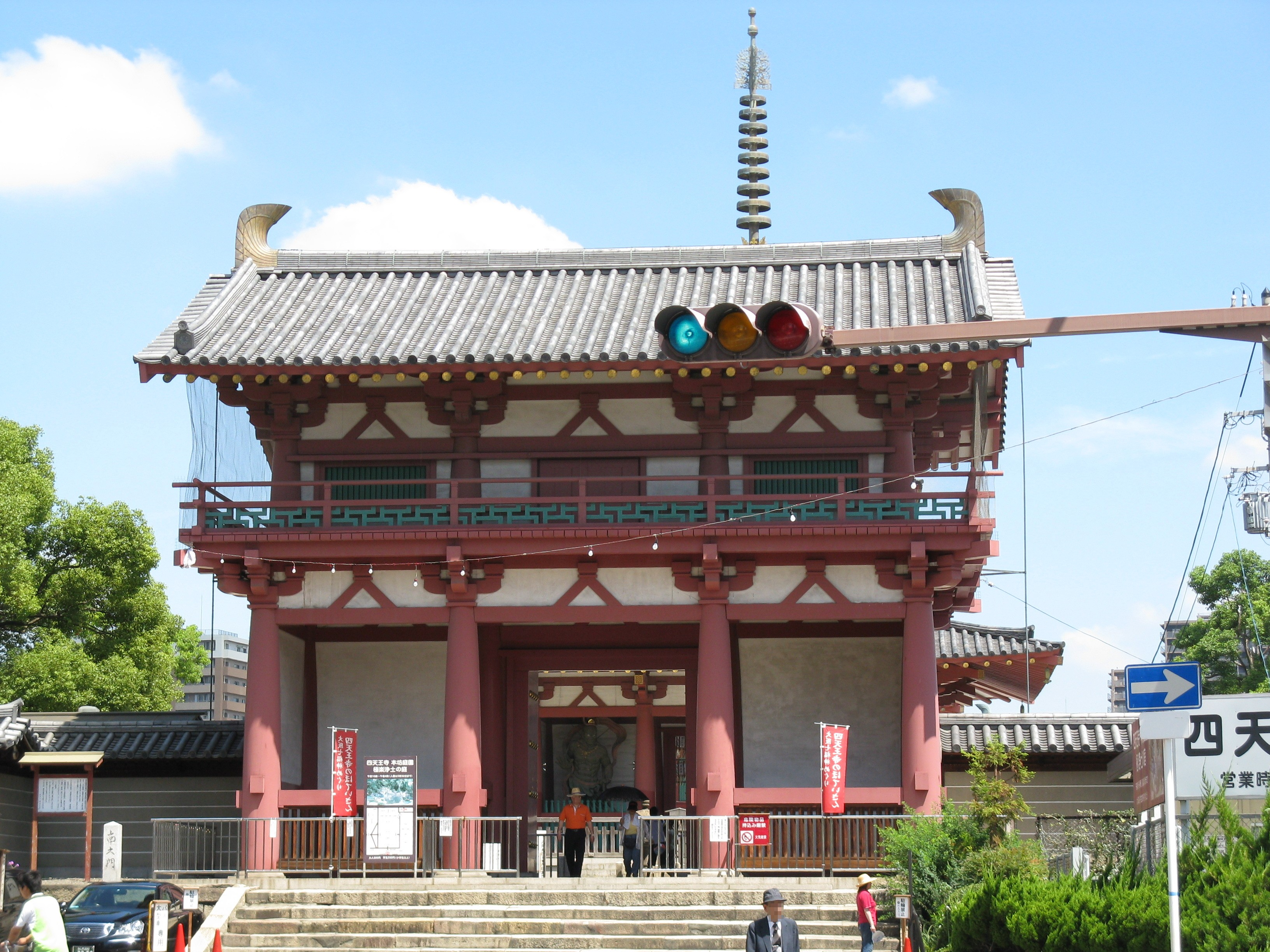
The Great South Gate (Nandai-mon)

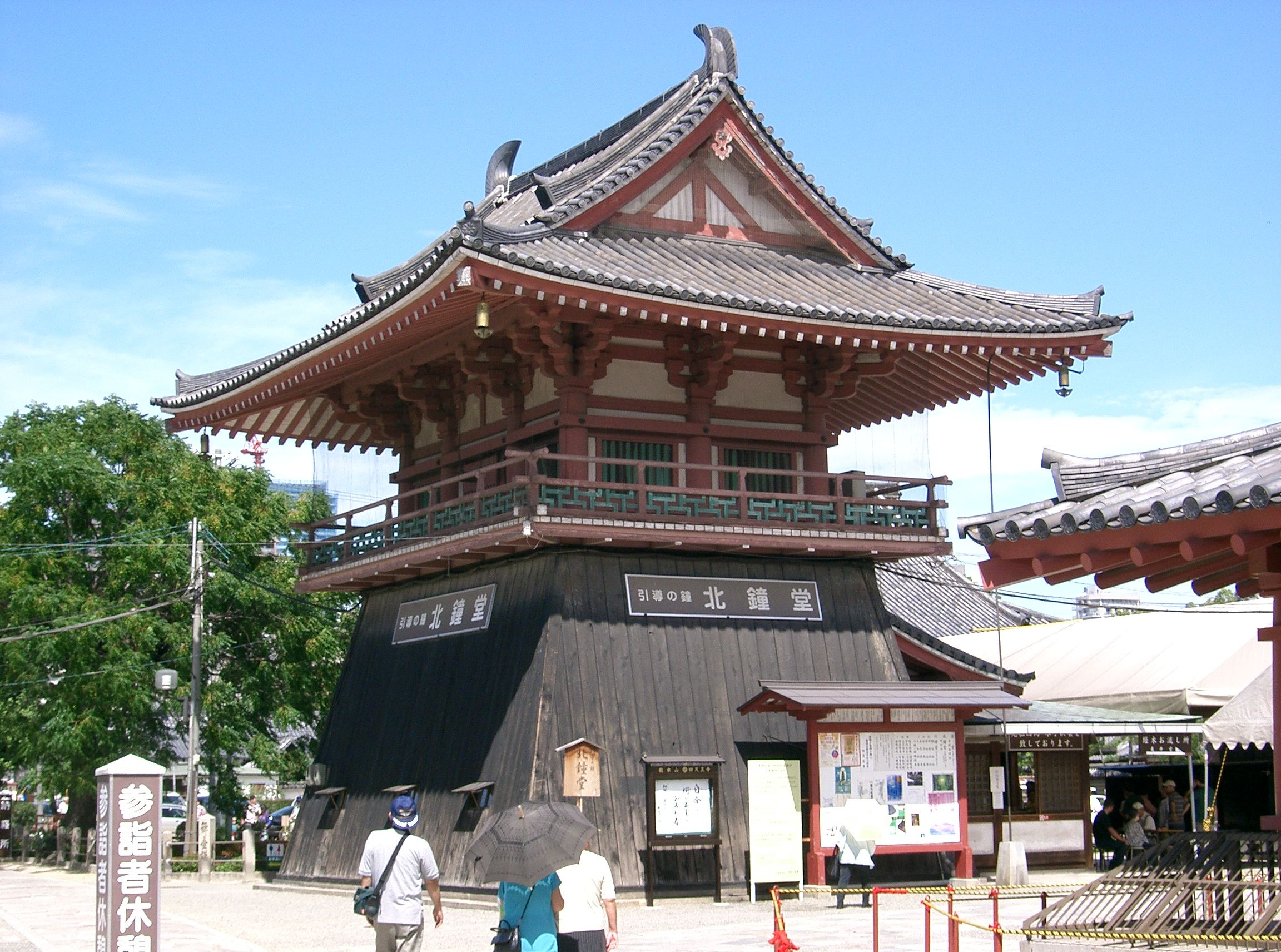
Northern belfry

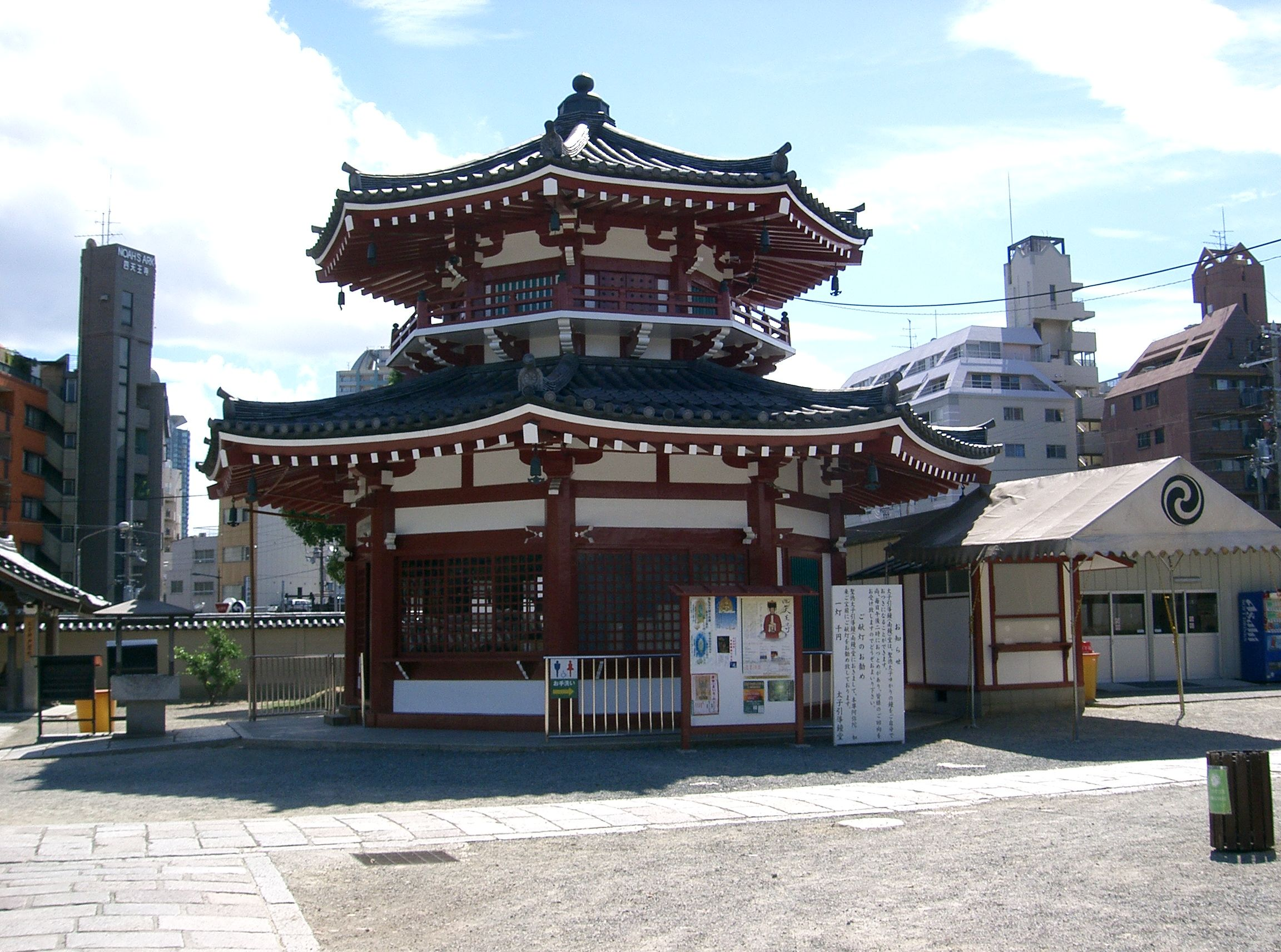
Southern belfry

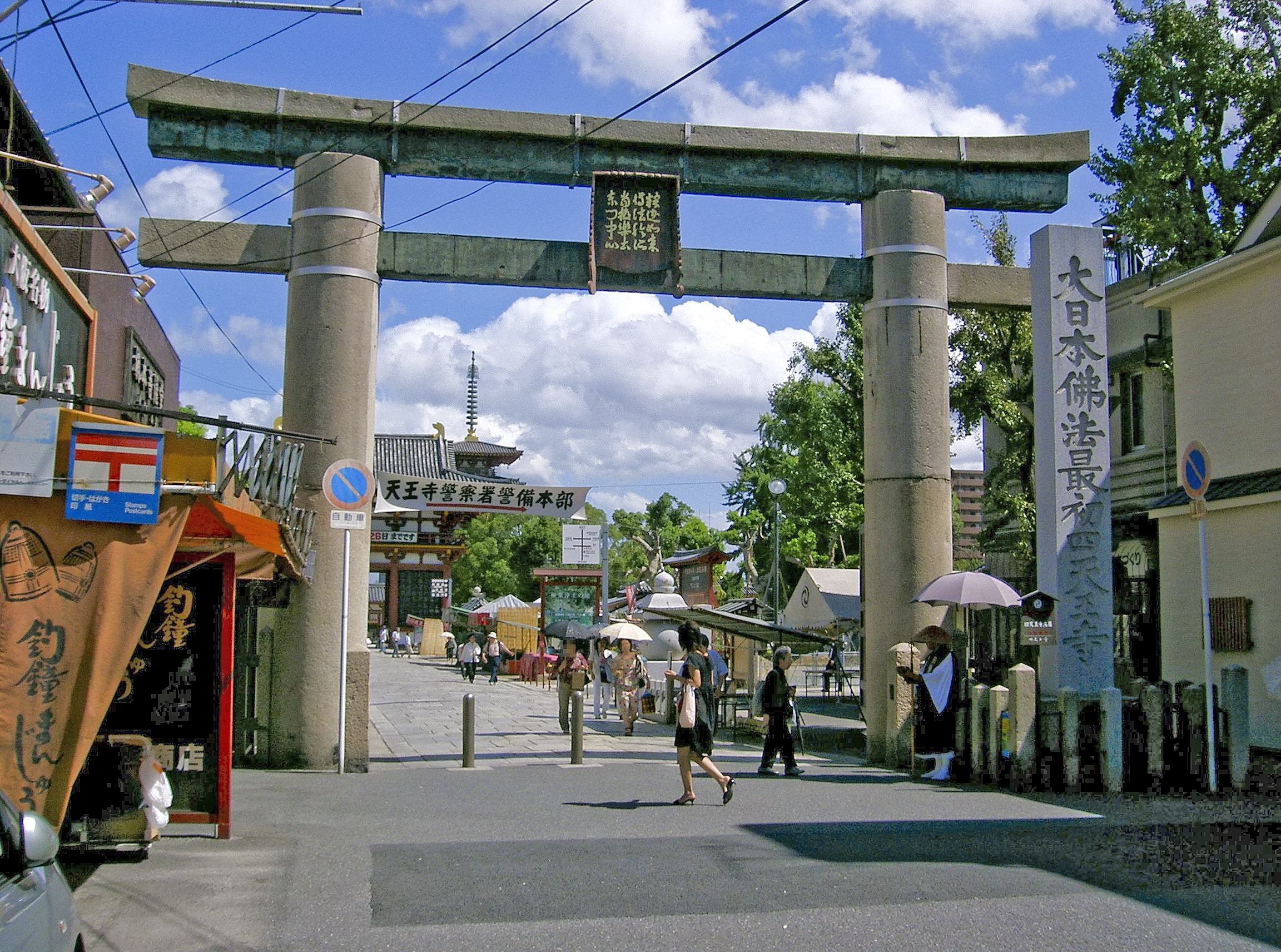
Stone torii

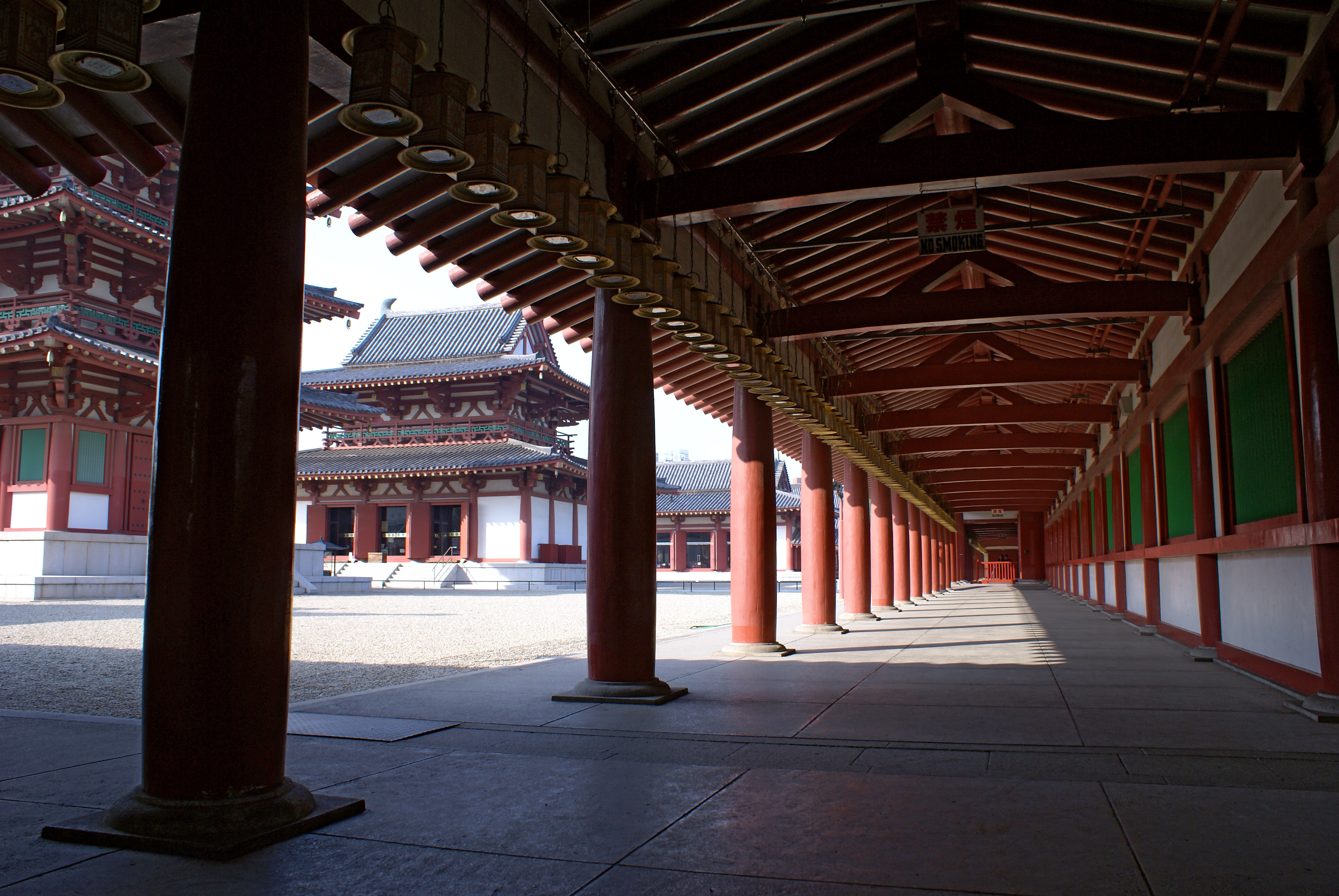
Courtyard

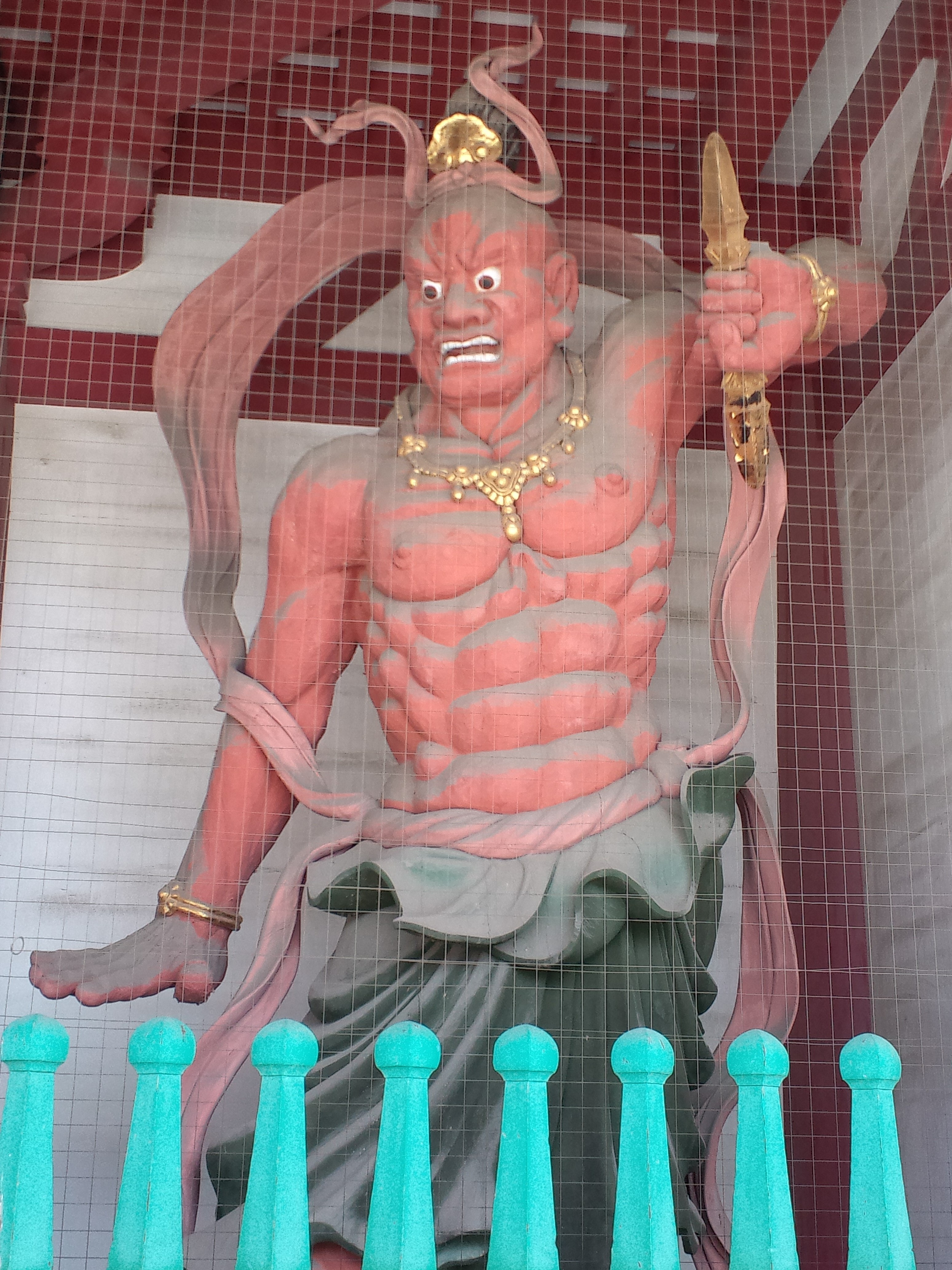
Niōmon

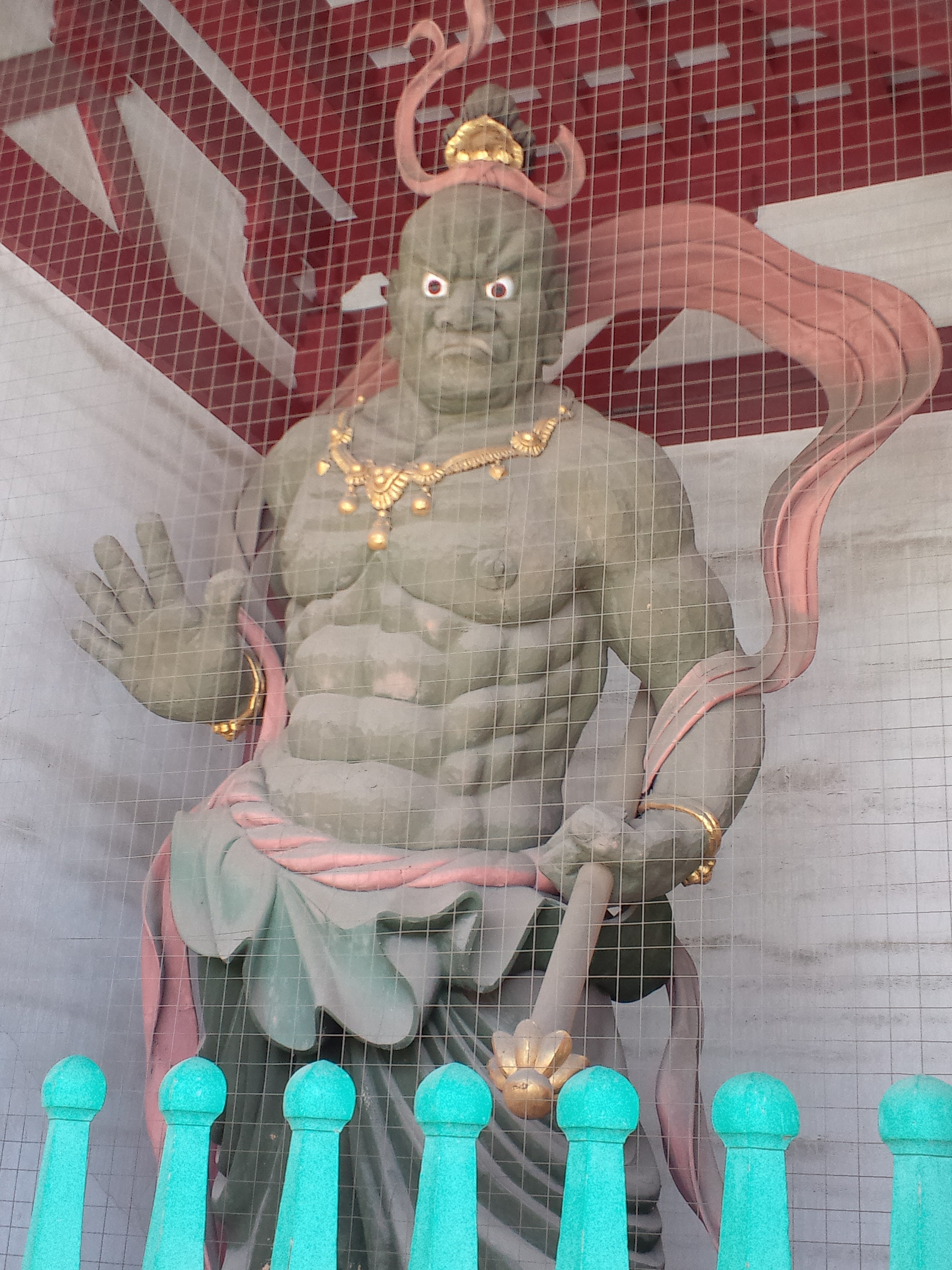
Niōmon

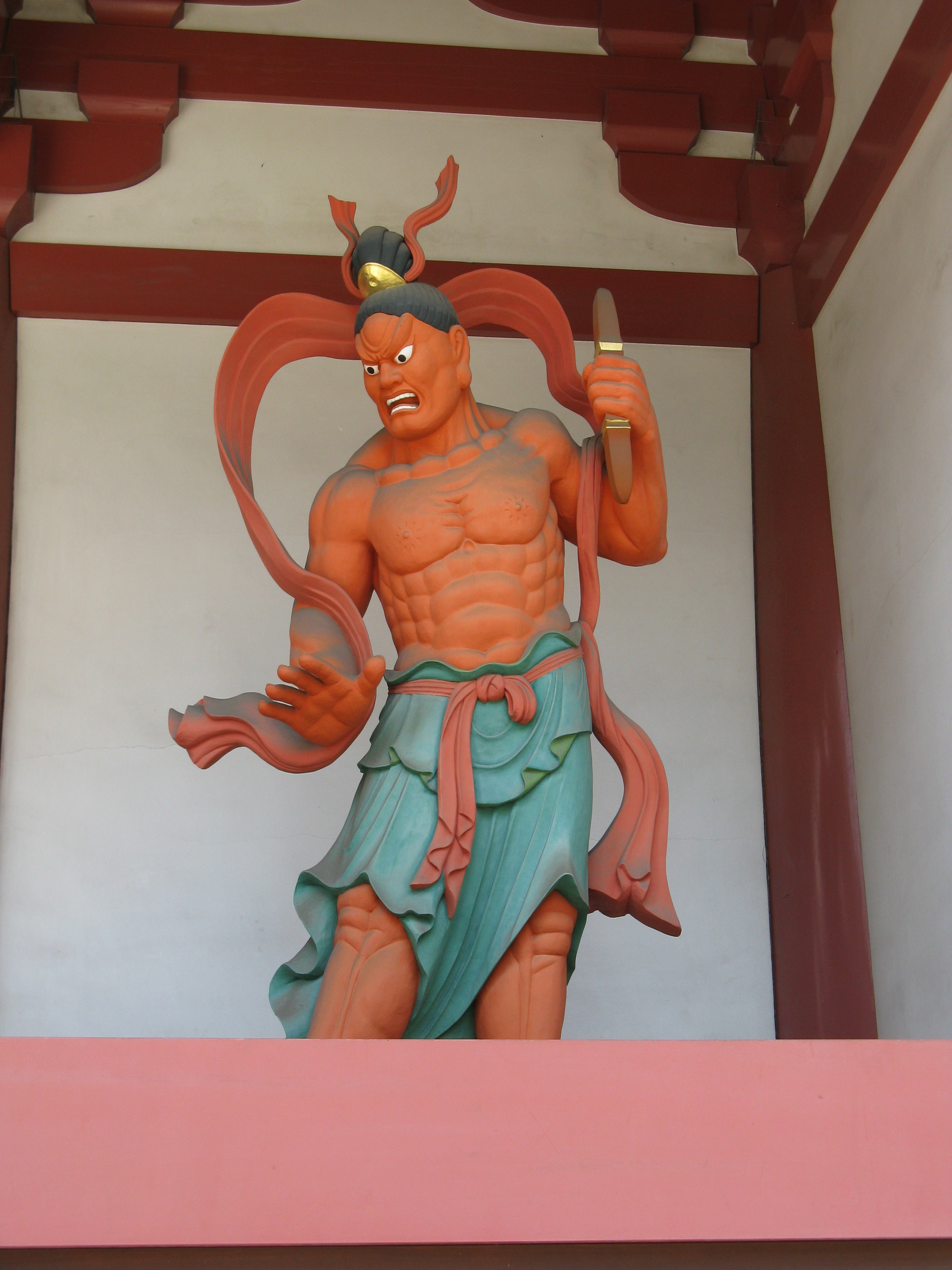
Daimon 1

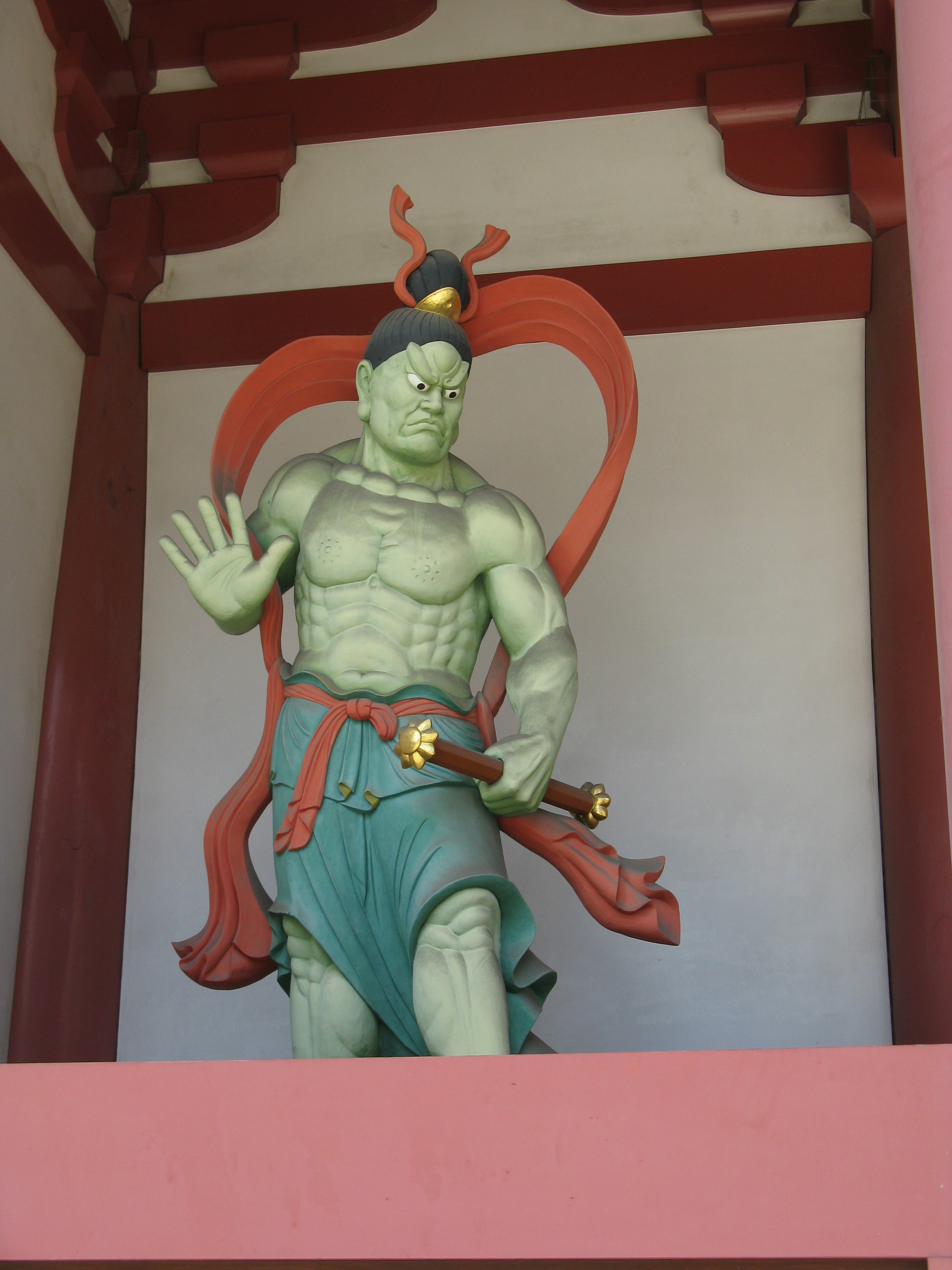
Daimon 2

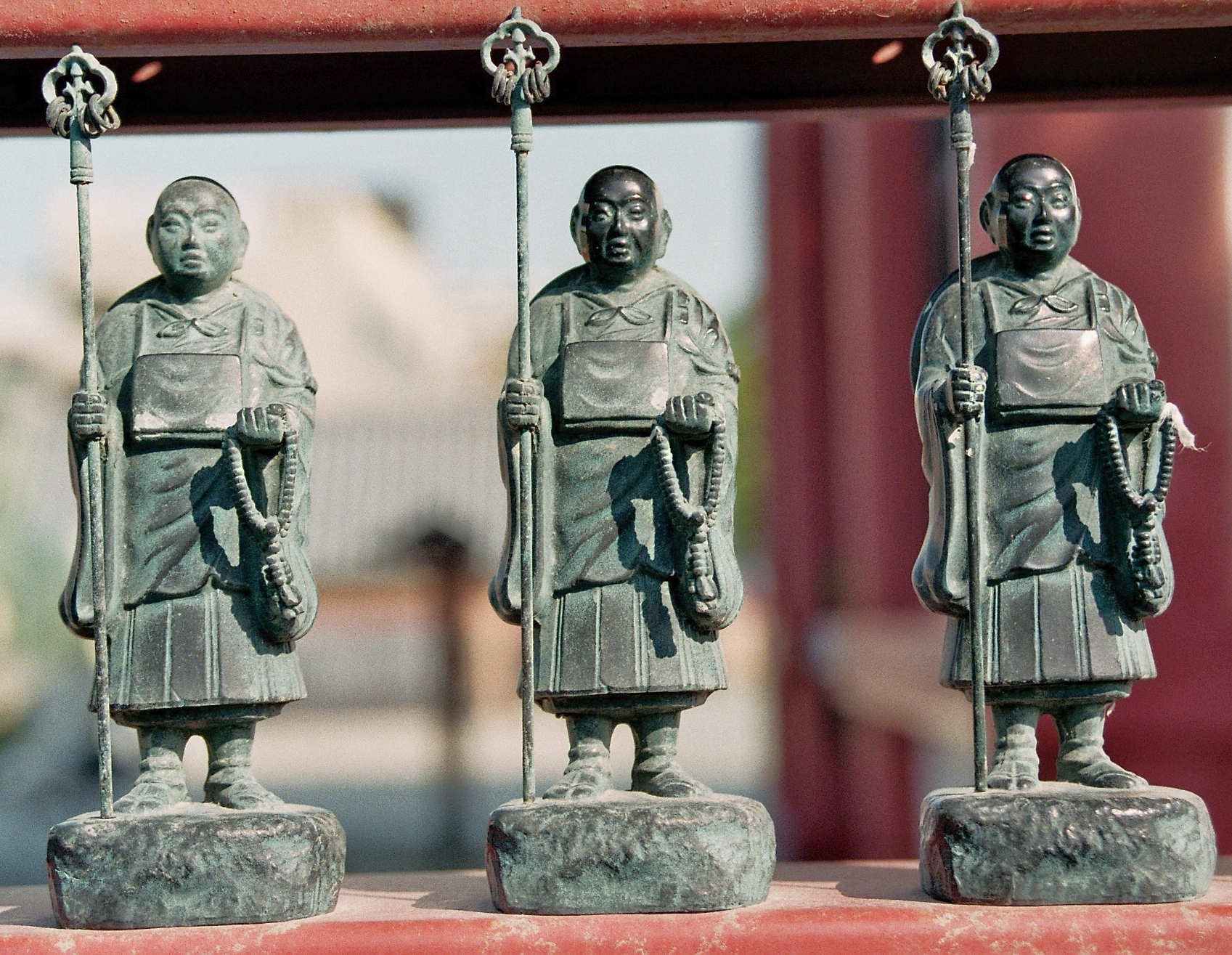
Statuettes of Kūkai

== See also ==
- List of National Treasures of Japan (archaeological materials)
- List of National Treasures of Japan (crafts: others)
- List of National Treasures of Japan (crafts: swords)
- List of National Treasures of Japan (paintings)
- List of National Treasures of Japan (writings)
- Thirteen Buddhist Sites of Osaka
- Historical Sites of Prince Shōtoku
