= SLE (disambiguation) =

SLE may refer to:

== Business and finance ==
- Sara Lee Corporation (NYSE ticker: SLE)
- Separate legal entity, in the United States
- Single loss expectancy, for risk on an asset
- Sierra Leonean leone (currency code:SLE)

== Language ==
- Societas Linguistica Europaea, a linguistics society
- Sri Lankan English

== Medicine ==
- Systemic lupus erythematosus, an autoimmune disease
- St. Louis encephalitis, a mosquito-borne disease

== Science, technology and mathematics ==
- Semiconductor luminescence equations
- Sea level equation, following post-glacial rebound
- Schramm–Loewner evolution in statistical mechanics
- The Space Link Extension of CCSDS, for space data standards
- SUSE Linux Enterprise, an operating system

== Transport ==
- Seletar Expressway, Singapore
- Shore Line East, a rail service in Connecticut, US
- Sleeper Either Class, a type of railway car
- McNary Field, an airport in Oregon, US (IATA:SLE)

== Other uses ==
- Sierra Leone, ISO-3166-1 alpha-3 country code
- Spearhead Land Element of UK armed forces
- Supported leading edge kite, a type of power kite
- Sensory Logical Extrovert in socionics
