= Shitennoji Habikigaoka Junior and Senior High School =

Former school in Osaka Prefecture, Japan

Coordinates: 34.5455°N 135.5887°E

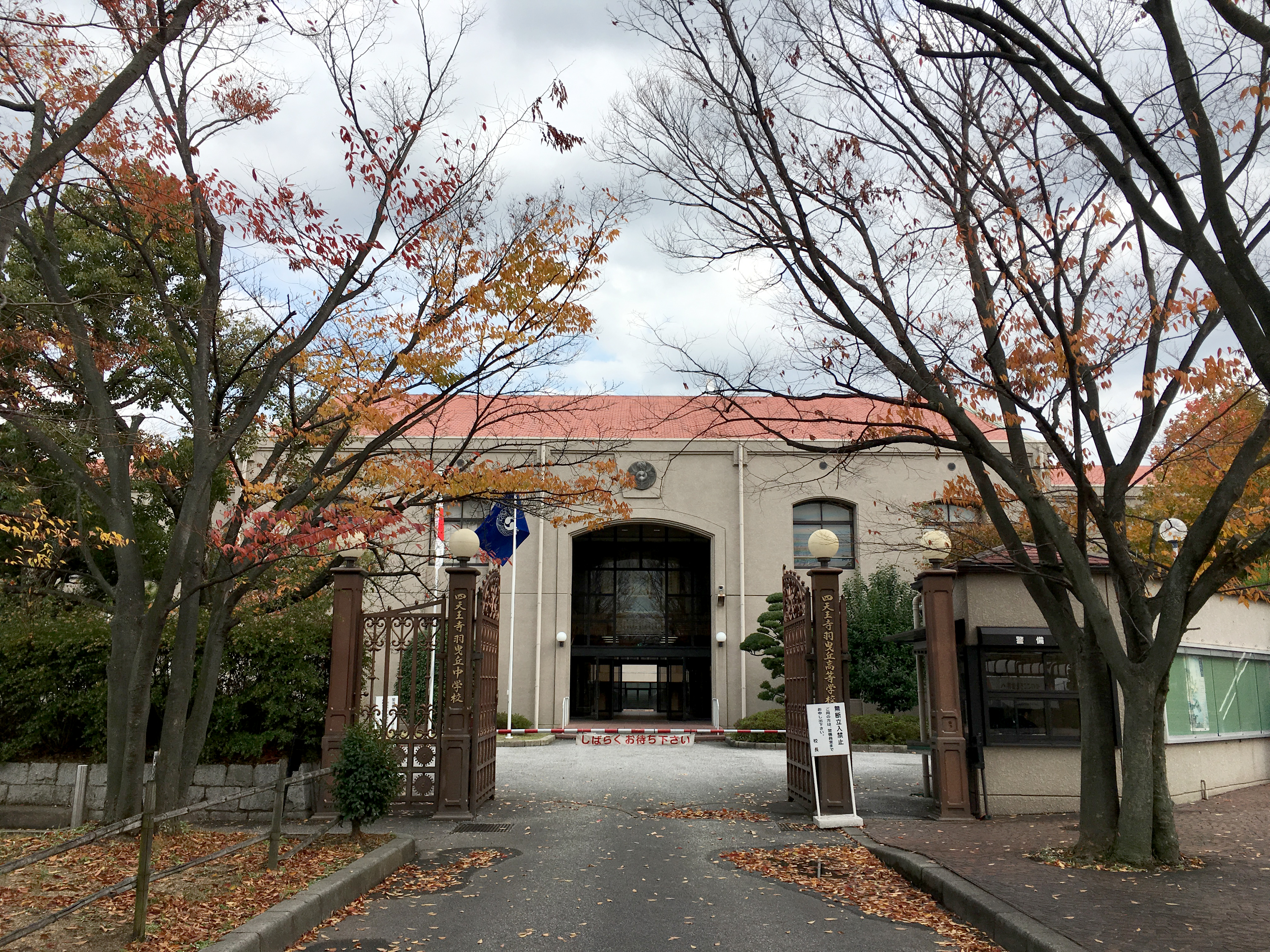
Shitennoji Habikigaoka Junior and Senior High School

Shitennoji Habikigaoka Junior and Senior High School (四天王寺羽曳丘中学校・高等学校, Shitennōji Habikigaoka Chūgakkō Kōtōgakkō) was a private junior and senior high school in Habikino, Osaka Prefecture. It is a part of the Shi-Tennoji Gakuen, a group of Buddhist educational institutions affiliated with Shitennoji temple in Osaka.

It was established in April 1984. The institution was previously known as Shitennoji International Buddhist Junior and Senior High School (四天王寺国際仏教中学校・高等学校, Shitennōji Kokusai Bukkyō Chūgakkō Kōtōgakkō); it took its current name in April 1990. The school closed in 2019.
