= Kyoikuto =

Memorial tower in Japan

Coordinates: 34°40′58.5″N 135°31′23.5″E

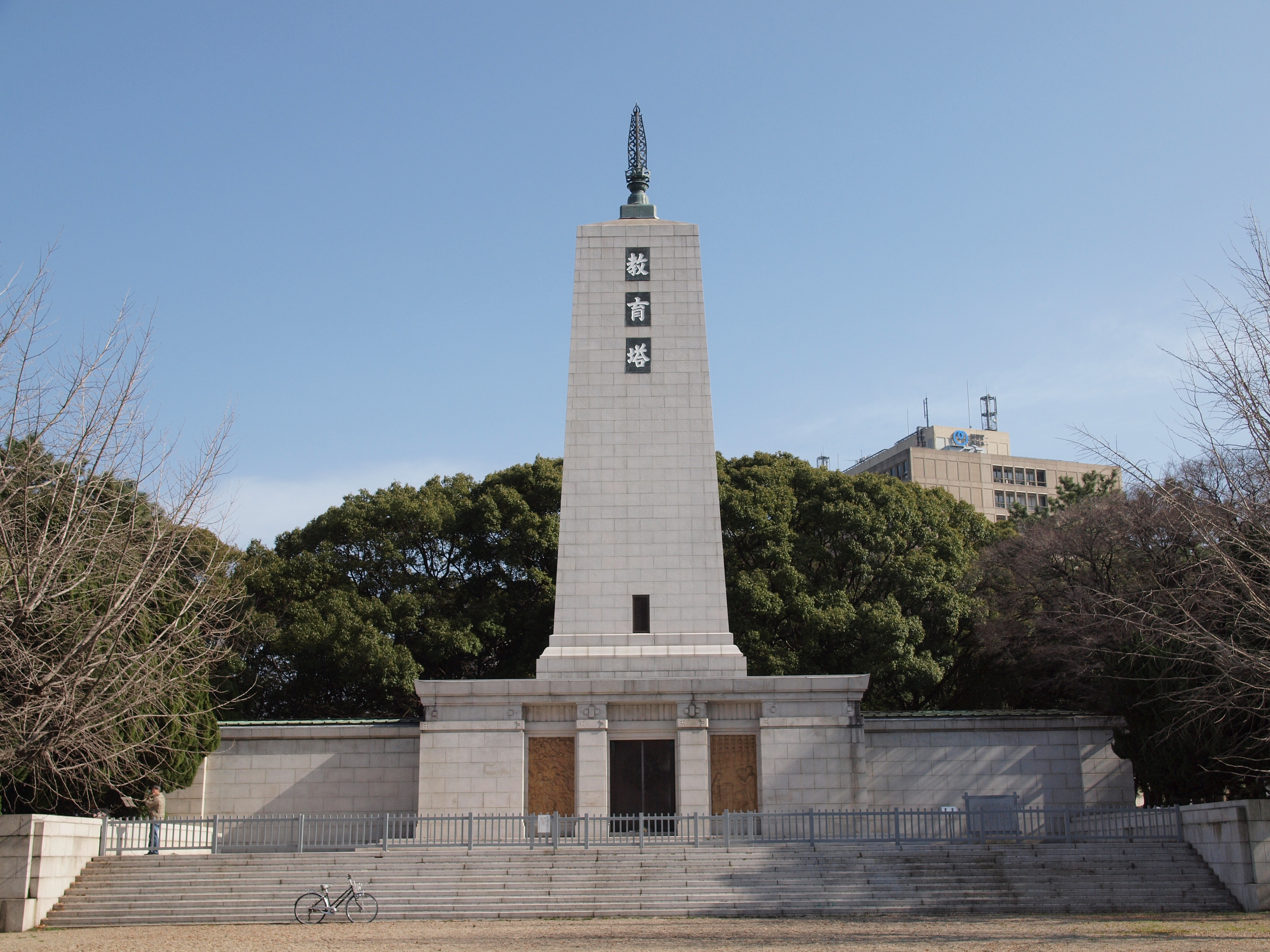
Kyoikuto in February 2009

The Kyoikuto, or the Education Tower (Japanese: 教育塔; or きょういくとう, literally "Education Tower") is a memorial tower located in Osaka Castle Park in Chuo Ward, Osaka City. It serves as a memorial for the victims of Muroto typhoon in 1934.

== Name ==
The name Kyoikuto came from Japanese word for Kyoiku (教育), which means education, and to (塔), which means tower.

== History ==
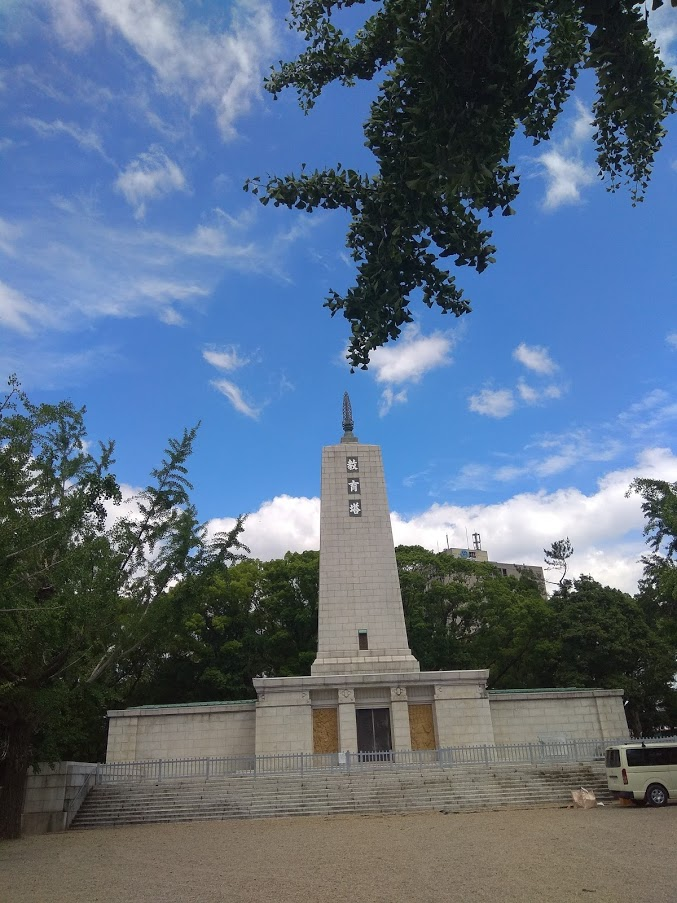
Kyoikuto, the Education Tower

On the morning of September 21, 1934, Muroto typhoon hit Kansai region. The typhoon struck during the school day, and many wooden school buildings were destroyed, causing the death of more than 600 children and 25 school employees. Immediately after the disaster, the education community in Osaka hoped that such a catastrophe would never happen again, and proposed the construction of a monument in order to commemorate the children and the school employees that died in the disaster. The Imperial Education Council decided to build a monument. People from all over Japan responded to this call, including children, students, teachers and volunteers, and together, they contributed more than 320,000 yen for building the memorial tower. The tower was completed on October 30, 1936.

The construction of the tower took about 350,000 yen in total. The tower itself cost 175,000 yen, while the other expenses include ceremony expenses, preparation expenses, etc. The tower was designed by Mr. Shimakawa Seiya, while the relief on the front of the tower was sculpted by sculptor Mr. Hasegawa Yoshiki.

== Location ==
The tower is located in the vicinity of Osaka Castle Park, near the south outer moat of the castle. The tower itself sits in the center of a square. A Hydrangea garden can be found nearby.

== Purpose ==
The tower was originally built to house the victims of Muroto typhoon in 1934 which has ties to the education system, including educators, faculty members and guardians. Since then, people that die while in the service of the education system may be buried here, if certain criteria are met, most notably the victims of Great Hanshin-Awaji Earthquake in 1995.

== Appearance ==
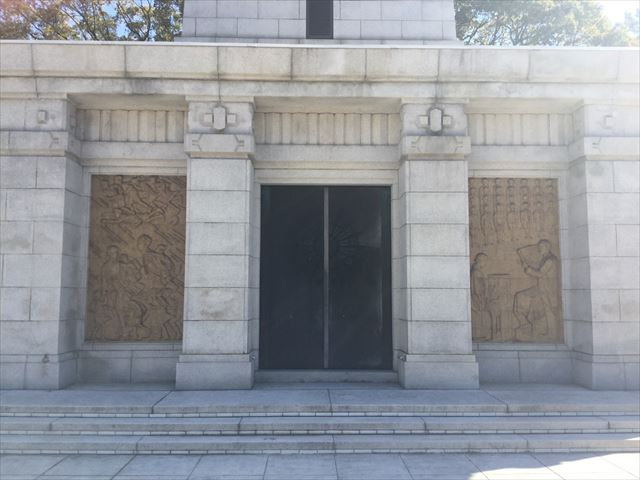
The relief at the front of Kyoikuto. Taken from: https://osaka-castle.net/osakajokoen/kyoikuto.html

The tower is 30 meters (98 ft) high, and occupies 333 square meters (3,580 sq ft). The tower is centered on reinforced concrete and white granite on the outside. In the center below the tower is a 162-square-meter (1,740 sq ft) room. There is a stone monument that reads "やすらかに" (equivalent to RIP in English) in the central room of the room. There are two 86-square-meter (930 sq ft) side rooms on both sides of the center room. The side rooms has a name plate listing the names of the people who were buried here.

The front entrance is flanked by two relief. The relief on the left depicts the teachers protecting the students while during the typhoon disaster. The relief on the right depicts the Japanese emperor declaring something in a ceremony.

The most notable feature of the tower is the three kanji words "教育塔" displayed vertically, and can be seen from a distance. The finial (tip) of the tower is known as a sōrin, a typical feature of pagoda in Japan, revealing its religious origin.

== Education Festival ==
The first Education Festival was held on October 30, 1936, the day of the tower's completion, and the Imperial Rescript on Education was issued. Since then, the festival is held on October 30 every year. The ritual was originally held in Shinto or Buddhist style, but the religious elements were removed when Japanese Teachers' Association took over the maintenance and management of the tower and sponsorship of the Education Festival, from the now dissolved Imperial Education Council.
