= Takamatsu Construction Group =

Japanese construction company

Takamatsu Construction Group Co., Ltd.

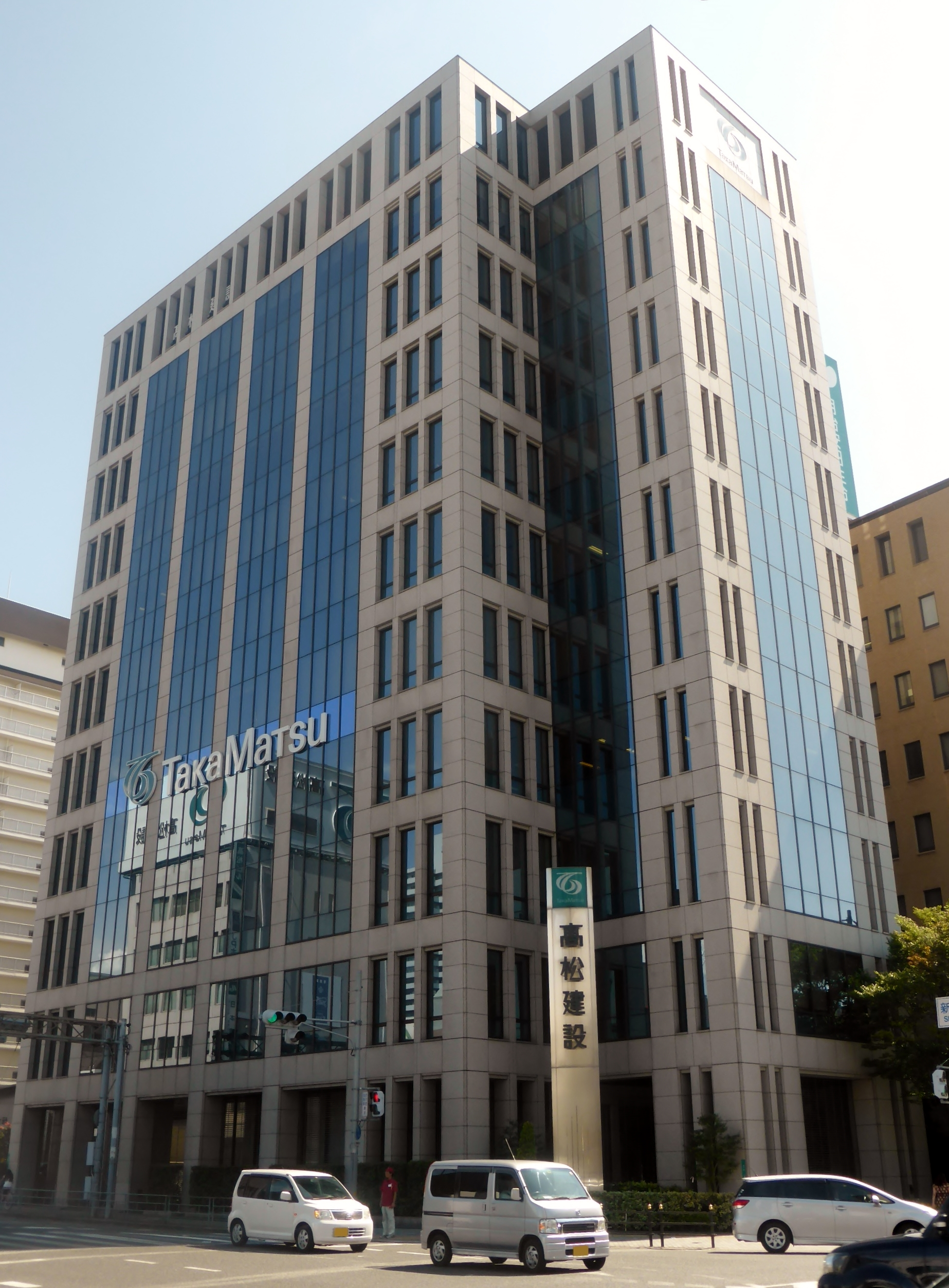
- Takamatsu Construction Group headquarters in Osaka, Japan
- Native name: 株式会社 髙松コンストラクショングループ
- Company type: Public (K.K)
- Traded as: TYO: 1762
- ISIN: JP3457900003
- Industry: Construction, civil engineering
- Founded: 1917; 109 years ago
- Founder: Tomekichi Takamatsu
- Headquarters: Yodogawa-ku, Osaka, Japan
- Number of locations: 2 headquarters (Osaka and Tokyo)
- Key people: Nobuhiko Yoshitake (President); Takayoshi Takamatsu (Vice President)
- Revenue: ¥245,1 million (FY2018)
- Operating income: ¥4,715 million (FY2013)
- Net income: ¥2,911 million (FY2013)
- Total assets: ¥141,231 million (FY2013)
- Total equity: ¥92,142 million (FY2013)
- Number of employees: 3,372 (FY2018)
- Subsidiaries: Takamatsu Corporation; Asunaro Aoki Construction Co., Ltd.; Takamatsu Construction Group USA, Inc.; Nihon Owners Credit Co., Ltd.
- Website: www.takamatsu-cg.co.jp

Takamatsu Construction Group Co., Ltd. (Japanese: 株式会社 髙松コンストラクショングループ, Hepburn: Kabushikigaisha takamatsu konsutorakushongurūpu) is a conglomerate of construction and civil engineering companies headquartered in Osaka, Japan. Its subsidiaries specialize in the architecture of high-rise buildings, health and welfare facilities, shrines and temples, and public civil engineering projects such as airports, harbors, railways, roadways and residential developments.

== Overview ==
In May 2008, it was decided to transfer Takamatsu Construction to a holding company by transferring its main business division and a portion of its real estate division to Nippon Interior Co., Ltd. After that, the trade name of Nippon Interior changed to Takamatsu Construction Co., Ltd., which later changed to Takamatsu Construction Group Co., Ltd. in October 2008.

As of 2019, the corporation consists of 22 companies split into two groups, one for architecture and the other for civil engineering, led by Takamatsu Corporation and Asunaro Aoki Construction Co., Ltd, respectively.

== Corporate Structure ==
- Takamatsu Construction Group Co., Ltd.
  Parent holding company
  - Takamatsu Corporation
    Construction of private residential and commercial buildings
    - Takamatsu Techno Service Co., Ltd.
      Renovation, repairs and building maintenance
    - Takamatsu Estate Co., Ltd.
      Administration of buildings and condominiums
    - Sumino Kogei Co., Ltd.
      Furniture design and residential/commercial facility construction
    - JP Home Co., Ltd.
      Individual residence design
      - Nakamura Shaji Co., Ltd.
        Design, construction and refurbishment of shrines and temples
    - Mibu Corporation Co., Ltd.
      Real estate sales and mediation
    - Nihon Owners Credit Co., Ltd.
      Financing company for construction work
  - Asunaro Aoki Construction Co., Ltd.
    Civil engineering and construction of commercial facilities, high-rise buildings, condominiums
    - Mirai Construction Co., Ltd.
      Harbor administration, marine engineering and environmental protection
      - Aoki Marine Co., Ltd.
        Reclamation, dredging and maritime logistics
      - M's Co., Ltd.
        Renovation, repairs and office building maintenance
    - Toko Geotech Co., Ltd.
      Ground improvement, slope engineering and cooling/fireproofing technologies
    - Asunaro Road Co., Ltd.
      Paving and asphalt engineering
    - Niigata Mira Co., Ltd.
      Civil engineering and paving
    - Shimada Gumi Co., Ltd.
      Excavation, research and preservation of archaeological resources
  - Takamatsu Construction Group USA, Inc.
    Holding company for business in the United States

== History ==
- October 1917: Founded as Shinomatsugumi in Osaka
- June 1965: Founded Shinomatsu Estate Co., Ltd.
- May 1980: Founded Nippon Interior Co., Ltd
- October 1990: Changed name from Shinomatsu to Takamatsu
- October 1997- Listed on Section 2 of the Osaka Securities Exchange
- January 2000: Listed on Section 2 of the Tokyo Stock Exchange
- October 2000: Acquired a stake in the Komatsu Construction Industry Co., Ltd. (which later changed its trade name to Asunaro Construction Co., Ltd.)
- July 2002: Acquired Aokikensetsu Co., Ltd. (Aoki Marine)
- October 2002: Formed GWA (Green Wood Alliance) based on 3 companies: Kasamatsu Construction, Asunaro Construction and Aoki Construction
- April 2004: Merger of Asunaro Construction and Aokikensetsu into Asunaro Aoki Construction Co., Ltd.
- March 2005: Listed in Section 1 of the Tokyo Stock Exchange and Osaka Securities Exchange
- January 2006: Acquired Kongō Gumi, specializing in temple and shrine architecture. Prior to the acquisition, Kongō Gumi was the oldest continuously operated independent company in the world.
- September 2008: Acquired all shares of Asunaro Aoki Construction
- October 2008: Transition to holding company system. Takamatsu Construction Co., Ltd. changed its business name to Takamatsu Construction Group, Inc., and Nippon Interior Co., Ltd., whose main business was transferred, changed its business name to Shinomatsu Construction Co., Ltd.
