= 1934 Muroto typhoon =

Pacific typhoon hitting Japan

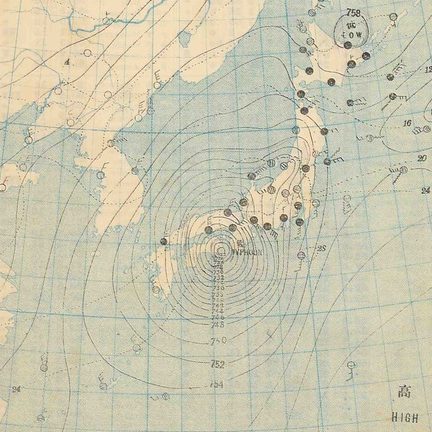
- Surface weather analysis of the typhoon near Japan on September 21

Meteorological history
- Formed: September 13, 1934
- Extratropical: September 21, 1934
- Dissipated: September 25, 1934

Typhoon
- 10-minute sustained (JMA)
- Highest winds: 150 km/h (90 mph)
- Highest gusts: 235 km/h (145 mph)
- Lowest pressure: 911.9 hPa (mbar); 26.93 inHg (Record lowest for landfalling storm in mainland Japan)

Overall effects
- Fatalities: 3,066 total
- Damage: ≥$300 million (1934 USD)
- Areas affected: Japan, Alaska
- IBTrACS
- Part of the 1934 Pacific typhoon season

In September 1934, a violent typhoon caused tremendous devastation in Japan, leaving more than 3,000 people dead in its wake. Dubbed the Muroto typhoon (室戸台風, Muroto Taifū), the system was first identified on September 13 over the western Federated States of Micronesia. Moving generally northwest, it eventually brushed the Ryukyu Islands on September 20. Turning northeast, the typhoon accelerated and struck Shikoku and southern Honshu the following morning. It made landfalls in Muroto, Kaifu, Awaji Island, and Kobe. A pressure of 911.9 hPa (26.93 inHg) was observed in Muroto, making the typhoon the strongest ever recorded to impact Japan at the time. This value was also the lowest land-based pressure reading in the world on record at the time; however, it was surpassed the following year during the 1935 Labor Day hurricane. After clearing Japan, the now extratropical storm traveled east and weakened. Turning north by September 24, the system deepened and impacted the Aleutian Islands; it was last noted the following day over western Alaska.

Regarded at the time as the "second-greatest catastrophe of modern Japan" after the 1923 Great Kantō earthquake, the storm left parts of Osaka in ruins. Tens of thousands of structures were damaged or destroyed, leaving approximately 200,000 people homeless. Among the 3,066 people killed were 421 children and teachers who perished when their flimsy schools were destroyed. That ranked it, at the time, as the deadliest typhoon in Japanese history. In addition to the fatalities, 13,184 people were injured. Total damage exceeded $300 million (1934 USD).

== Meteorological history ==
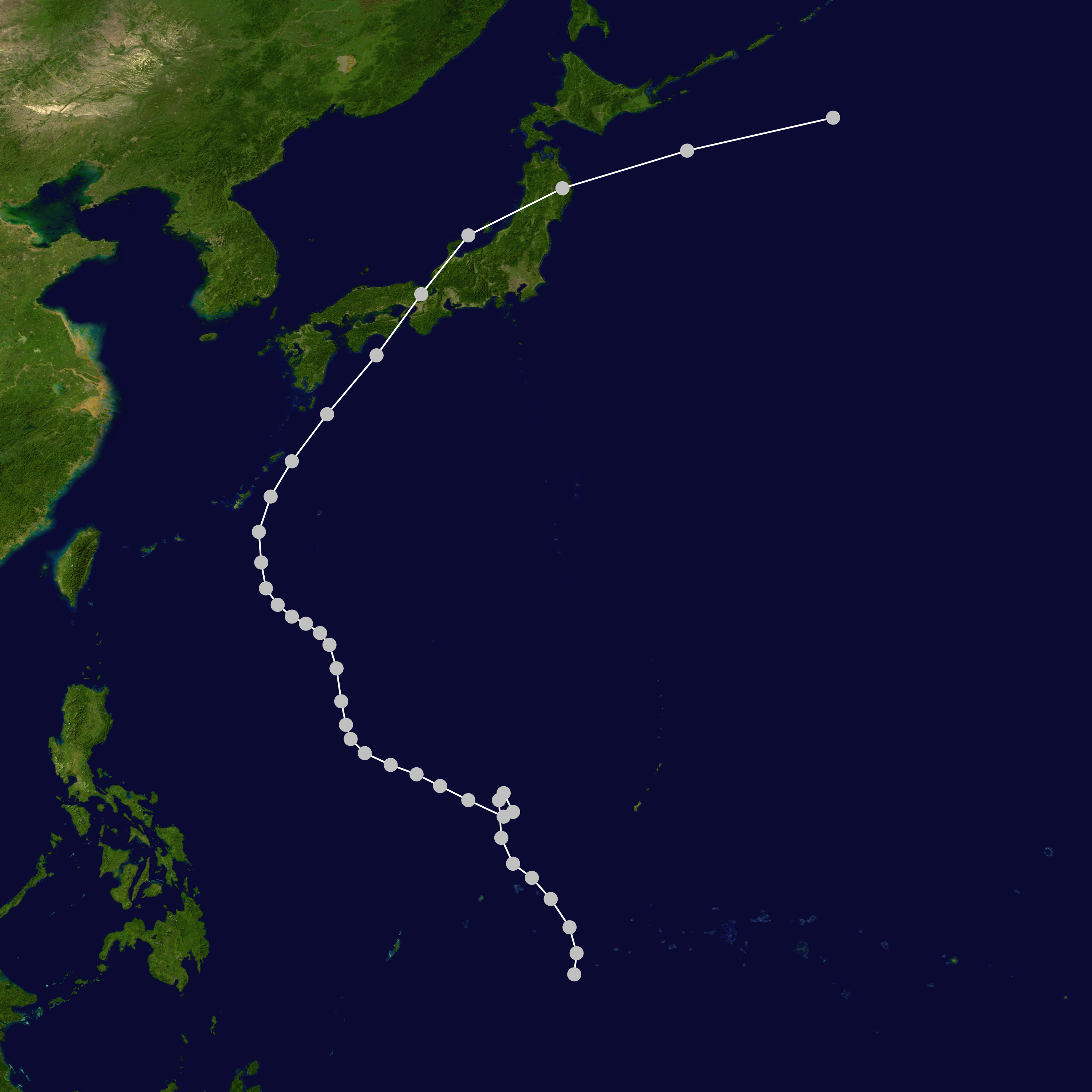
Map plotting the storm's track and intensity, according to the Saffir–Simpson scale Map key Saffir–Simpson scale Tropical depression (≤38 mph, ≤62 km/h) Tropical storm (39–73 mph, 63–118 km/h) Category 1 (74–95 mph, 119–153 km/h) Category 2 (96–110 mph, 154–177 km/h) Category 3 (111–129 mph, 178–208 km/h) Category 4 (130–156 mph, 209–251 km/h) Category 5 (≥157 mph, ≥252 km/h) Unknown Storm type Tropical cyclone Subtropical cyclone Extratropical cyclone, remnant low, tropical disturbance, or monsoon depression

On September 13, 1934, a tropical cyclone developed over the western Caroline Islands. The storm traveled generally northwest, executing a brief cyclonic loop on September 14–15. After a brief stint traveling nearly due north on September 17, the cyclone began recurving to the northeast. It brushed the Ryukyu Islands to the southeast on September 20 as it accelerated northeast. On the morning of September 21, the typhoon struck Shikoku and southern Honshu. According to the Central Meteorological Observatory (now called the Japan Meteorological Agency), maximum sustained winds reached 150 km/h (90 mph), with gusts exceeding 215 km/h (130 mph).

The typhoon first made landfall over Muroto, Kōchi Prefecture, resulting in it later being dubbed the "Muroto typhoon". A then-world record low barometric pressure for a land station of 911.9 hPa (26.93 inHg) was observed in Muroto. Though surpassed less than a year later during the 1935 Labor Day hurricane in the Florida Keys, it remains the lowest value ever observed in mainland Japan and the third-lowest throughout the country. It briefly emerged over the Kii Channel before striking the Kaifu District in Tokushima Prefecture. The system then crossed the Kii Channel again and traversed Awaji Island. After another brief stint over water, the storm made its next landfall directly over Kobe, Hyōgo Prefecture, just 30 km (19 mi) west of Osaka City. A barometric pressure of 954.3 hPa (28.18 inHg) was observed in Osaka. Crossing mainland Japan, the storm briefly emerged over the Sea of Japan before traversing northern Honshu.

Pronounced frontal features, a characteristic of extratropical cyclones, developed late on September 21, with a cold front extending south toward the Philippines. The system continued on an easterly course and was last noted in the International Best Track Archive on September 22 moving away from Hokkaido. Surface weather analyses depict the system continuing east, crossing the International Date Line (180°) by September 23. During this time, its central pressure rose to roughly 985–990 mbar (hPa; 29.09–29.34 inHg). On September 24, the storm turned north toward the Aleutian Islands of the then Territory of Alaska and deepened. Winds up to Force 10—89 to 102 km/h (55 to 63 mph)—on the Beaufort scale affected parts of the Aleutians and a pressure of 964 mbar (hPa; 28.47 inHg) was observed near 48°N 160.5°W. Traversing the Bering Sea, the system was last identifiable on September 25 over western Alaska.

== Impact ==
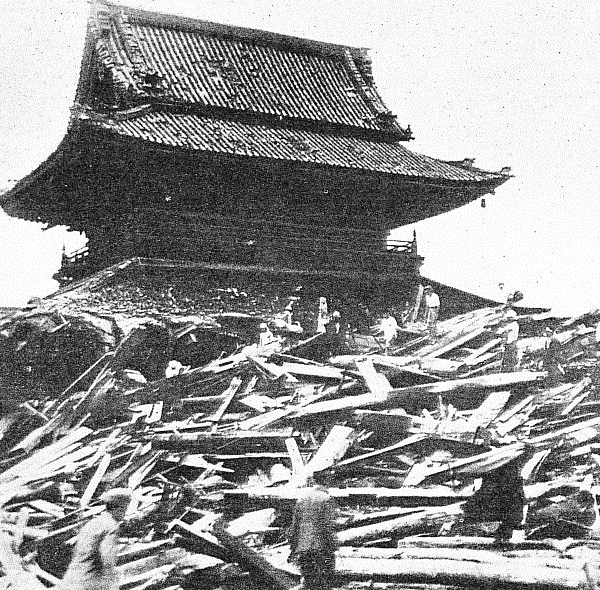
The damaged Shitennō-ji temple in Osaka after the storm

Contemporaneously called the "second-greatest catastrophe of modern Japan", and the "worst typhoon in a generation", the storm wrought tremendous damage in Shikoku and southern Honshu, with areas in and around Osaka suffering the brunt of its impact. The effects, at the time, were second only to the 1923 Great Kantō earthquake. Throughout Japan, 3,066 people were killed, of which at least 1,665 deaths were in Osaka Prefecture, and 13,184 others were injured. This ranked it as the deadliest typhoon in Japanese history, until Typhoon Vera in 1959 which killed approximately 5,000 people. A total of 34,262 buildings were destroyed, another 40,274 were severely damaged, and 401,157 were flooded or affected. Total damage far exceeded $300 million (1934 USD). Approximately 200,000 people were rendered homeless in Osaka, and at least 250,000 required assistance.

In Kōchi Prefecture, where the storm first made landfall, powerful wind gusts—measured up to 234 km/h (145 mph)—caused tremendous damage. Torrential rain accompanied the storm. Throughout Kōchi, 1,815 homes were destroyed and 6,064 were damaged or flooded; 81 people died and 399 more sustained injuries. Sixty-three people died in Muroto when the typhoon's storm surge swept away 550 homes.

The greatest damage, however, took place across eastern Osaka Bay. A maximum tide of 3.1 to 4.2 m (10 to 14 ft) was observed there, the highest ever for the region. Areas up to 8 km (5.0 mi) inland were inundated by the typhoon's storm surge, total of 49.31 km^{2} (19.04 mi^{2}) of the city was flooded. The city of Osaka was crippled by the typhoon, electricity was completely lost, the water supply network sustained significant damage, and communications were disrupted. Powerful winds devastated the city's poorly built schools, destroying 128 buildings. Within them, at least 421 children and teachers were killed, while 1,100 others sustained injury. One teacher, Masuji Ashida, was hailed as a hero for sacrificing himself to save his students by propping up the exit of his collapsing classroom with his own body; his students escaped before he was crushed under the weight of the building. An insane asylum along the city's outskirts was swept away with 60 patients missing. A five-story pagoda (built in 1812) at the Shitennō-ji temple collapsed, killing 3 people and trapping 20 others. The Sotojima hospital for leprosy was destroyed; 260 patients are believed to have drowned after the building collapsed amid rising water and gale-force winds. Near Ōtsu, a passenger train derailed, killing 10 people and injuring 165.

The city's industrial sector sustained severe losses, exceeding US$90 million. More than 3,000 factories were destroyed and thousands more were damaged. The Japanese Army's munitions program was significantly setback due to destroyed ammunition factories. At least 100 people drowned in the city's harbor where more than 1,600 seagoing craft were grounded, sunk, or otherwise damaged.

Thirty of the nation's then forty-six prefectures were impacted by the typhoon. Significant damage took place in Aichi, Gifu, Kyoto, Nagano, Nagasaki, Tokushima, Tottori, Wakayama, and Yamanashi prefectures. In Kyoto, at least 209 people were killed and 858 were injured.

== Aftermath ==
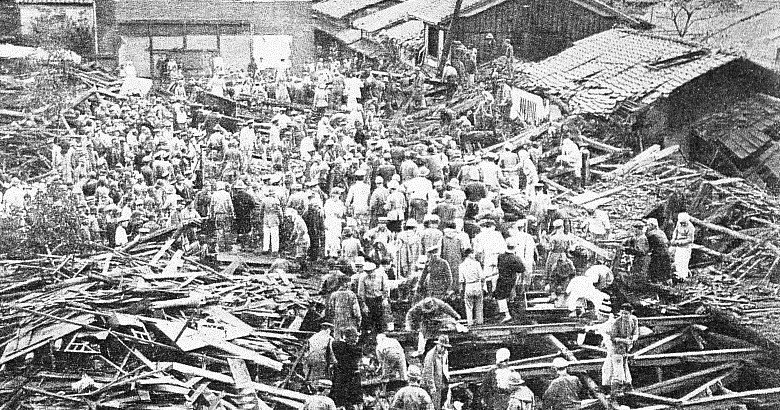
The storm's aftermath in Nishijin, Kyoto

Immediately following the typhoon's tremendous impact, the Japanese military was deployed to Osaka before nightfall on September 21 and water was being trucked in. Officials in Osaka Prefecture released an immediate ¥10 million in relief funds. Baron Kischizaemon Sumitomo donated ¥1 million (US$300,000) to relief funds, the largest such private donation in the nation's history at the time. The Cabinet of Japan held a special meeting to discuss emergency operations. Three destroyers from the Kure Naval District, loaded with medical equipment and other essentials, were deployed to assist in relief work. Outbreaks of typhoid fever, dysentery, and scarlet fever plagued survivors in the storm's aftermath.

During an October 5 cabinet meeting, Minister of Education Genji Matsuda recommended schools to be built with steel in light of the large number of children killed. Reconstruction of the affected areas required an estimated 100,000 tons of steel. The National Diet held a special meeting in November to address issues regarding the typhoon's aftermath.

Following the disaster, a marked increase in actions and countermeasures to storm surge events and typhoons were enacted. Throughout Osaka, construction of breakwaters and embankments alleviated flood risks in coastal communities, reducing the risk of life (Note: The 1986 study of storm surge events in Osaka defined risk of life as "the ratio of the number of dead to the population at that time".) from roughly 10^{−3} to 10^{−7} by the time of Typhoon Nancy in 1961. Before the onset of World War II, total anti-flood construction in Osaka spanned 36.68 km (22.79 mi); this included 16.52 km (10.27 mi) along rivers and canals, 11.08 km (6.88 mi) of levees, and 11.08 km (6.88 mi) of breakwaters. These protected the city from surges of 3.5 m (11 ft) above Osaka Port. Several other projects to expand and rebuild the anti-flood system took place in the decades following World War II.

According to a 2010 report by the Central Disaster Prevention Council, if a storm identical to the 1934 Muroto typhoon were to strike in the modern day, it would kill approximately 7,600 people.

== See also ==
- Kyoikuto
- Typhoon Nancy (1961) – a powerful storm that caused extensive damage, primarily in Osaka; dubbed as the second Muroto typhoon
