= Separate legal entity =

In the United States, a separate legal entity (SLE) refers to a type of legal entity with detached accountability. A company is set up as an SLE, such as a limited liability company or a corporation, to legally separate it from the individual or owner.

If a business is a separate legal entity, it means it has some of the same rights in law as a person. It is, for example, able to enter contracts, sue and be sued, and own property. A sole trader or partnership does not have a separate legal entity.

== See also ==
- Types of business entity
