= Hanayama Station =

Railway station in Kobe, Japan

KB11 Hanayama Station 花山駅
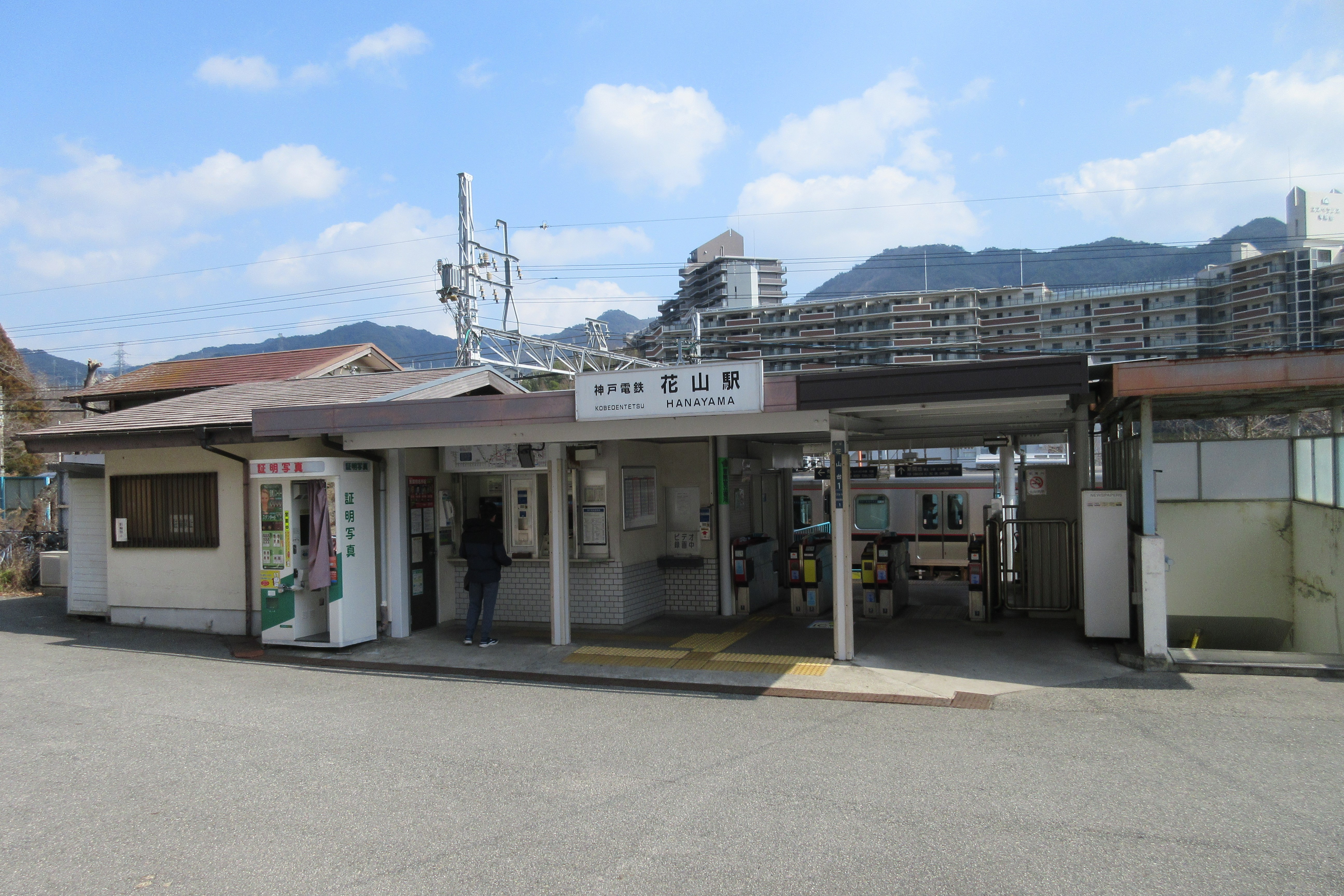
- Station building in 2018

General information
- Location: Yamadacho Kamitanigami, Kita-ku, Kobe-shi Hyōgo-ken 651-1242; Japan
- Coordinates: 34°46′10.32″N 135°11′12.76″E
- Operator: Kobe Electric Railway (Shintetsu)
- Line: Shintetsu Arima Line
- Distance: 15.4 km (9.6 miles) from Minatogawa
- Platforms: 2 side platforms

Other information
- Status: Unstaffed
- Station code: KB11
- Website: Official website

History
- Opened: 1 December 1965

Passengers
- FY2019: 3,113
Location
- Location within Hyōgo Prefecture Location within Japan

Hanayama Station (花山駅, Hanayama-eki) is a passenger railway station located in Kita-ku Kobe, Hyōgo Prefecture, Japan. It is operated by the private transportation company, Kobe Electric Railway (Shintetsu).

== Lines ==
Hanayama Station is served by the Shintetsu Arima Line, and is located 15.4 kilometers from the terminus of the line at Minatogawa and 15.8 kilometers from Shinkaichi.

== Station layout ==
The station consists of two ground-level unnumbered side platforms, connected to the station building by a level crossing.

=== Platforms ===
station side	■ Shintetsu Arima Line	for Arimaguchi and Arima Onsen and Sanda
opposite side	■ Shintetsu Arima Line	for Minatogawa and Shinkaichi

== Adjacent stations ==
«	Service	»
Shintetsu Arima Line
Special Rapid Express: Does not stop at this station
Express: Does not stop at this station
Tanigami	Semi-Express	Oike
Tanigami	Local	Oike

== History ==
The station was opened on December 1, 1965.

== Passenger statistics ==
In fiscal 2019, the station was used by an average of 3,113 passengers daily

== Surrounding area ==
- Hyogo Prefectural Road No. 15 Kobe Sanda Line (Arima Highway)
- Kobe Municipal Hanayama Elementary School
- Hanayama east housing complex

== See also ==
- List of railway stations in Japan
- Hanayama Funicular
