= Karatodai Station =

Railway station in Kobe, Japan

KB15 Karatodai Station 唐櫃台駅
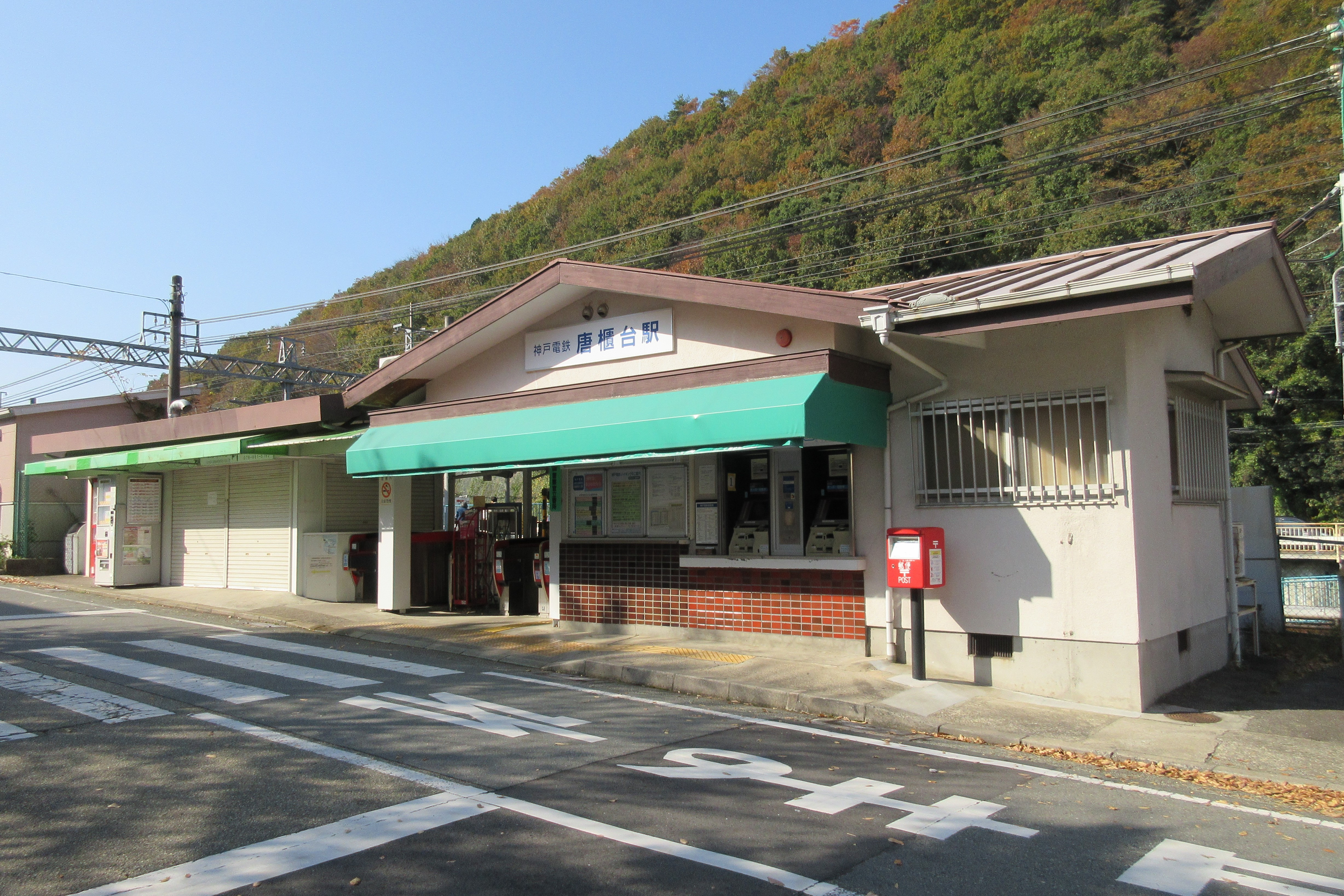
- Station building in 2018

General information
- Location: 2-chōme-1 Karatodai, Kita-ku, Kobe-shi Hyōgo-ken 651-1332; Japan
- Coordinates: 34°47′26.38″N 135°12′42.11″E
- Operator: Kobe Electric Railway (Shintetsu)
- Line: Shintetsu Arima Line
- Distance: 18.9 km (11.7 miles) from Minatogawa
- Platforms: 2 side platforms

Other information
- Status: Unstaffed
- Station code: KB15
- Website: Official website

History
- Opened: 1 July 1966

Passengers
- FY2019: 2,436

Services
Preceding station	Kobe Electric Railway	Following station
Oike KB12 towards Minatogawa	Arima Line Express	Arimaguchi KB15 towards Arima Onsen
Shintetsu Rokko KB13 towards Minatogawa	Arima Line Semi Express Local	Arimaguchi KB15 towards Arima Onsen
Location
- Location within Hyōgo Prefecture Location within Japan

Karatodai Station (唐櫃台駅, Karatodai-eki) is a passenger railway station located in Kita-ku Kobe, Hyōgo Prefecture, Japan. It is operated by the private transportation company, Kobe Electric Railway (Shintetsu).

== Lines ==
Karatodai Station is served by the Shintetsu Arima Line, and is located 18.9 kilometers from the terminus of the line at Minatogawa and 19.3 kilometers from Shinkaichi.

== Station layout ==
The station consists of two ground-level unnumbered side platforms, connected to the station building by a level crossing.

=== Platforms ===
station side	■ Shintetsu Arima Line	for Minatogawa and Shinkaichi
opposite side	■ Shintetsu Arima Line	for Arimaguchi and Arima Onsen and Sanda

== History ==
The station was opened on July 1, 1966

== Passenger statistics ==
In fiscal 2019, the station was used by an average of 2,436 passengers daily

== Surrounding area ==
The surrounding area is a residential area developed by Kobe City.

- Hyogo Prefectural Route 15 Kobe Sanda Line (Arima Highway)
- Hyogo Prefectural Kobe Kita High School

== See also ==
- List of railway stations in Japan
