= Kita-Suzurandai Station =

Railway station in Kobe, Japan

KB07 Kita-Suzurandai Station 北鈴蘭台駅
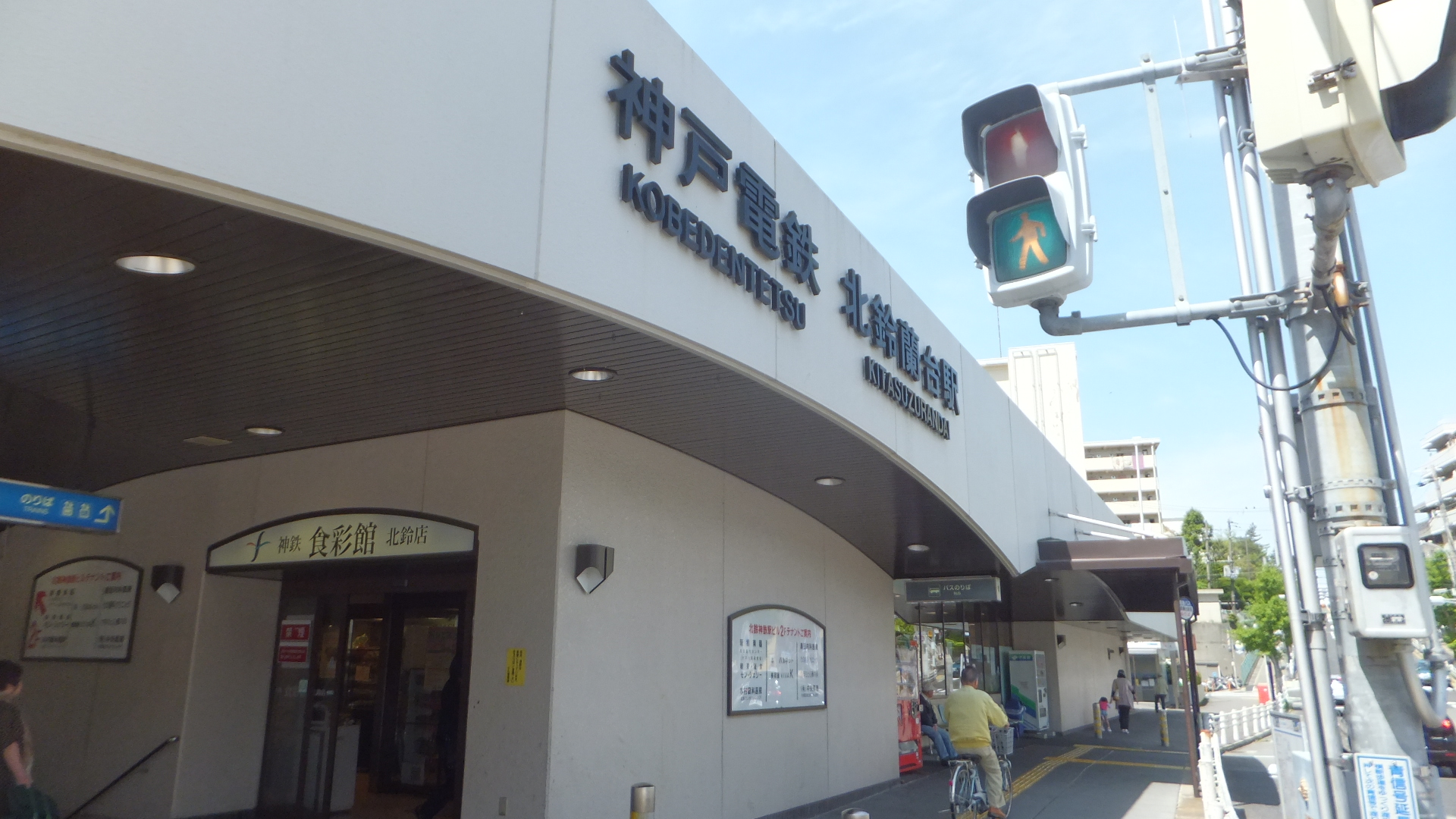
- Station building in 2014

General information
- Location: 4 Chome-1-13 Koeidai, Kita-ku, Kobe-shi Hyōgo-ken; Japan
- Coordinates: 34°44′22″N 135°09′07″E
- Operator: Kobe Electric Railway (Shintetsu)
- Line: Shintetsu Sanda Line
- Distance: 9.4 km (5.8 miles) from Minatogawa
- Platforms: 2 side platforms

Other information
- Status: Unstaffed
- Station code: KB07
- Website: Official website

History
- Opened: 6 April 1970

Passengers
- FY2019: 10,185
Location
- Location within Hyōgo Prefecture Location within Japan

Kita-Suzurandai Station (北鈴蘭台駅, Kita-Suzurandai-eki) is a passenger railway station located in Kita-ku Kobe, Hyōgo Prefecture, Japan. It is operated by the private transportation company, Kobe Electric Railway (Shintetsu).

== Lines ==
KaKita-Suzurandairatodai Station is served by the Shintetsu Arima Line, and is located 9.4 kilometers from the terminus of the line at Minatogawa and 9.8 kilometers from Shinkaichi.

== Station layout ==
The station consists of two side platforms, connected by an elevated station building. Since both the station building and the platform are located in a canal, the ticket gates and concourse are on the first basement floor, and the platform is on the second basement floor.

=== Platforms ===
1	■ Shintetsu Arima Line	for Arima Onsen and Sanda
2	■ Shintetsu Arima Line	for Shinkaichi

== Adjacent stations ==
«	Service	»
Shintetsu Arima Line
Suzurandai	Special Rapid Express	Yamanomachi
Suzurandai	Express	Yamanomachi
Suzurandai	Semi-Express	Yamanomachi
Suzurandai	Local	Yamanomachi

== History ==
The station was opened on April 6, 1970.

== Passenger statistics ==
In fiscal 2019, the station was used by an average of 10,185 passengers daily

== Surrounding area ==
- Kobe Koryo Gakuen High School
- Hyogo Prefectural Kobe Kohoku High School
- Hyogo Prefectural Kobe Special Needs School
- Kobe Municipal Sakuranomiya Elementary School

== See also ==
- List of railway stations in Japan
