= Shintetsu Arima Line =

Railway line in Kobe, Japan

Arima Line
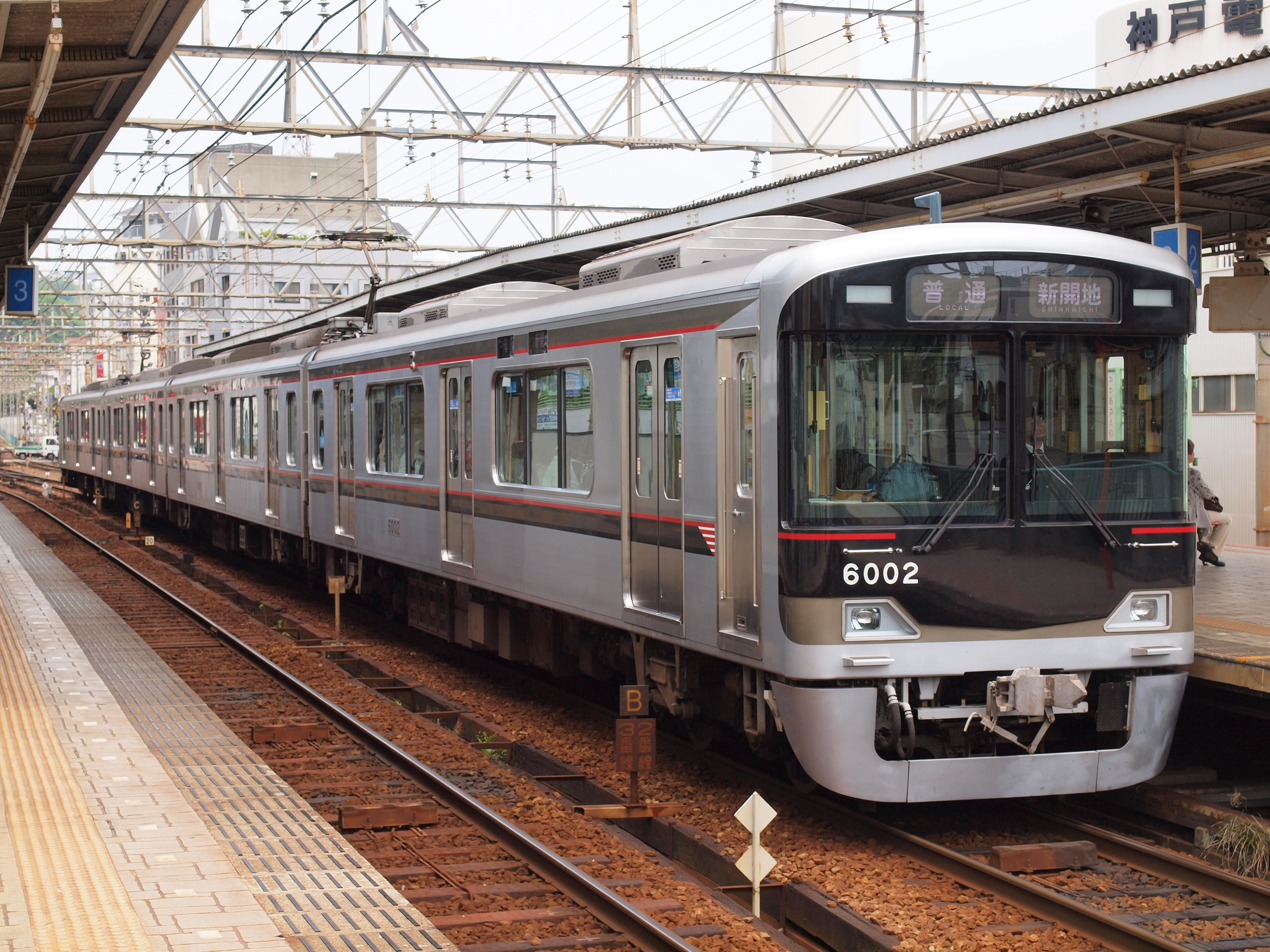
- Shintetsu 6000 series local train stopped at Suzurandai Station

Overview
- Native name: 有馬線
- Status: Operational
- Locale: Kobe, Hyōgo Prefecture
- Termini: Minatogawa; Arima Onsen
- Continues as: Sanda Line (from Arimaguchi)
- Stations: 15

Service
- Route number: KB
- Operator: Kobe Electric Railway

History
- Opened: November 11, 1928; 97 years ago

Technical
- Line length: 22.5 km (14.0 mi)
- Track gauge: 1,067 mm (3 ft 6 in)
- Electrification: 1500 V DC overhead catenary

The Arima Line (有馬線, Arima-sen) is a commuter railway line in Kobe, Japan operated by Kobe Electric Railway. It connects central Kobe with its northern suburbs in Kita-ku and Arima Onsen.

The line is 22.9 kilometres (14.2 mi) long, extending from Minatogawa in Hyogo-ku to Arima Onsen in Kita-ku.

== Operation ==
At Arimaguchi, almost all trains operate a through service to/from Sanda on the Sanda Line.

Arima Onsen only receives a small number of direct trains to/from Shinkaichi in the morning and evening peak hours, 7 days per week. At all other times a shuttle train operates between Arimaguchi and Arima Onsen, timed to connect with trains to/from Shinkaichi with a 1-2 minute connection time.

== History ==
The entire line opened in 1928, 1,067 mm (3 ft 6 in) gauge and electrified at 1500 VDC.

The Mitogawa – Arimaguchi section was double tracked between 1965 and 1966.

=== Former connecting lines ===
Arima Onsen Station - The 12 km (7.5 mi) line to Sanda on the Fukuchiyama Line was operated by the Arima Railway Company from 1915 to 1943.

== Stations ==
- S = stop
- ↑ = one direction only
- | = pass

No.	Station		Distance from Minatogawa (km)	Local (普通)	Semi-Express (準急)	Express (急行)	Special Rapid Express (特快速)	Connections	Location
KB01	Shinkaichi	新開地	-0.4	S	S	S	S	Hanshin - Hankyu Kobe Kosoku Line (Tozai Line) (HS 36)	Hyogo-ku, Kobe
↑ All trains operate through service via the Shintetsu Kobe Kosoku Line to/from Shinkaichi ↑
KB02	Minatogawa	湊川	0.0	S	S	S	S	Kobe Subway Seishin-Yamate Line (S06: Minatogawa-Koen Station); Shintetsu Kobe Kosoku Line	Hyogo-ku, Kobe
KB03	Nagata	長田	1.9	S	S	|	↑		Nagata-ku, Kobe
KB04	Maruyama	丸山	2.6	S	|	|	↑		Nagata-ku, Kobe
KB05	Hiyodorigoe	鵯越	3.6	S	|	|	↑		Hyogo-ku, Kobe
KB06	Suzurandai	鈴蘭台	7.5	S	S	S	S	Ao Line (Through Service)	Kita-ku, Kobe
KB07	Kita-Suzurandai	北鈴蘭台	9.4	S	S	S	S		Kita-ku, Kobe
KB08	Yamanomachi	山の街	10.3	S	S	S	S		Kita-ku, Kobe
KB09	Minotani	箕谷	12.0	S	S	|	↑		Kita-ku, Kobe
KB10	Tanigami	谷上	13.7	S	S	S	S	Kobe Subway Hokushin Line (S01)	Kita-ku, Kobe
KB11	Hanayama	花山	15.4	S	S	|	↑		Kita-ku, Kobe
KB12	Ōike	大池	17.1	S	S	S	↑		Kita-ku, Kobe
KB13	Shintetsu Rokko	神鉄六甲	18.1	S	S	|	↑		Kita-ku, Kobe
KB14	Karatodai	唐櫃台	18.9	S	S	S	↑		Kita-ku, Kobe
KB15	Arimaguchi	有馬口	20.0	S	S	S	↑	Sanda Line (Through Service)	Kita-ku, Kobe
KB16	Arima Onsen	有馬温泉	22.5	S	S				Kita-ku, Kobe
Through Services:				from Suzurandai; Local, Semi-express, Express (all) - to Ao on the Ao Line from Arimaguchi; Local, Semi-express, Express (all), Special rapid express (all) - to Sanda on the Sanda Line					

Abolished stations
Shin-yu Yaba (神有耶馬) - located between Hiyodorigoe and Suzurandai, abolished on February 15, 1939.
Shin-Arima (新有馬) - located between Arimaguchi and Arima Onsen, suspended on June 15, 1965, and abolished on February 28, 2013.
