= Yamanomachi Station =

Railway station in Kobe, Japan

KB08 Yamanomachi Station 山の街駅
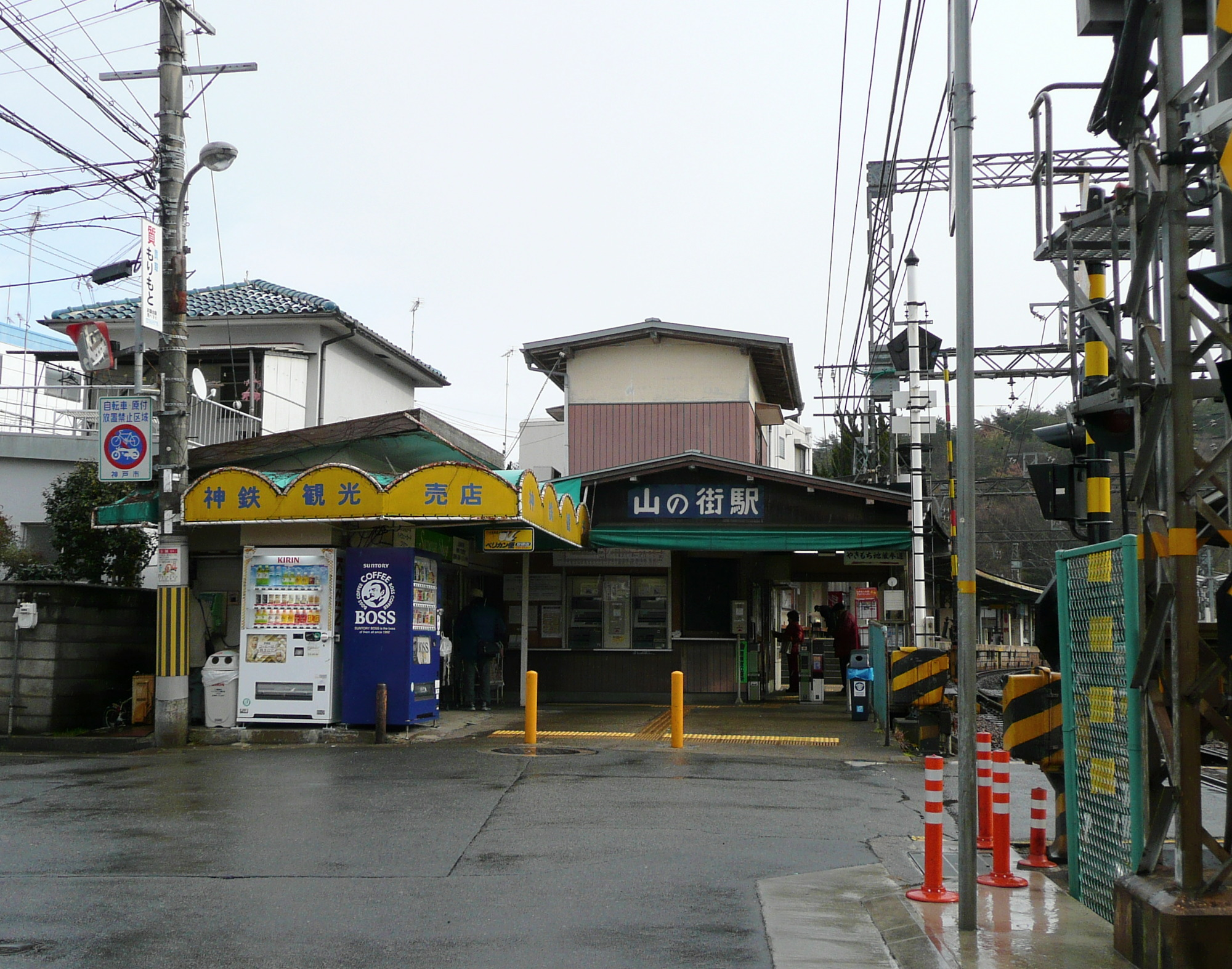
- Station building in 2018

General information
- Location: 7-chōme-1 Midorimachi, Kita-ku, Kobe-shi Hyōgo-ken 651-1221; Japan
- Coordinates: 34°44′47.94″N 135°9′10.49″E
- Operator: Kobe Electric Railway (Shintetsu)
- Line: Shintetsu Arima Line
- Distance: 10.3 km (6.4 miles) from Minatogawa
- Platforms: 2 side platforms

Other information
- Status: Unstaffed
- Station code: KB08
- Website: Official website

History
- Opened: 10 March 1935

Passengers
- FY2019: 2,227
Location
- Location within Hyōgo Prefecture Location within Japan

Yamanomachi Station (山の街駅, Yamanomachi-eki) is a passenger railway station located in Kita-ku Kobe, Hyōgo Prefecture, Japan. It is operated by the private transportation company, Kobe Electric Railway (Shintetsu).

== Lines ==
Yamanomachi Station is served by the Shintetsu Arima Line, and is located 10.3 kilometers from the terminus of the line at Minatogawa and 10.7 kilometers from Shinkaichi.

== Station layout ==
The station consists of two ground-level unnumbered side platforms, connected to the station building by a level crossing. The effective length of the platform is 4 cars. There are ticket gates on the north and south sides of the inbound platform and the ticket gate on the south side is directly connected to the roundabout where buses and taxis arrive and depart.

=== Platforms ===
station side	■ Shintetsu Arima Line	for Shinkaichi
opposite side	■ Shintetsu Arima Line	for Arima Onsen and Sanda

== Adjacent stations ==
«	Service	»
Shintetsu Arima Line
Kita-Suzurandai	Special Rapid Express	Tanigami
Kita-Suzurandai	Express	Tanigami
Kita-Suzurandai	Semi-Express	Minotani
Kita-Suzurandai	Local	Minotani

== History ==
The station was opened on November 28, 1928 as the Toge Signal Stop (峠信号所) and was elevated to full station status as Yamanomachi Station on March 10, 1935.

== Passenger statistics ==
In fiscal 2019, the station was used by an average of 2,227 passengers daily

== Surrounding area ==
There is a residential area on the west side of the station.

- Kobe Municipal Komidori Elementary School

== See also ==
- List of railway stations in Japan
