= Shintetsu Rokkō Station =

Railway station in Kobe, Japan

KB13 Shintetsu Rokkō Station 神鉄六甲駅
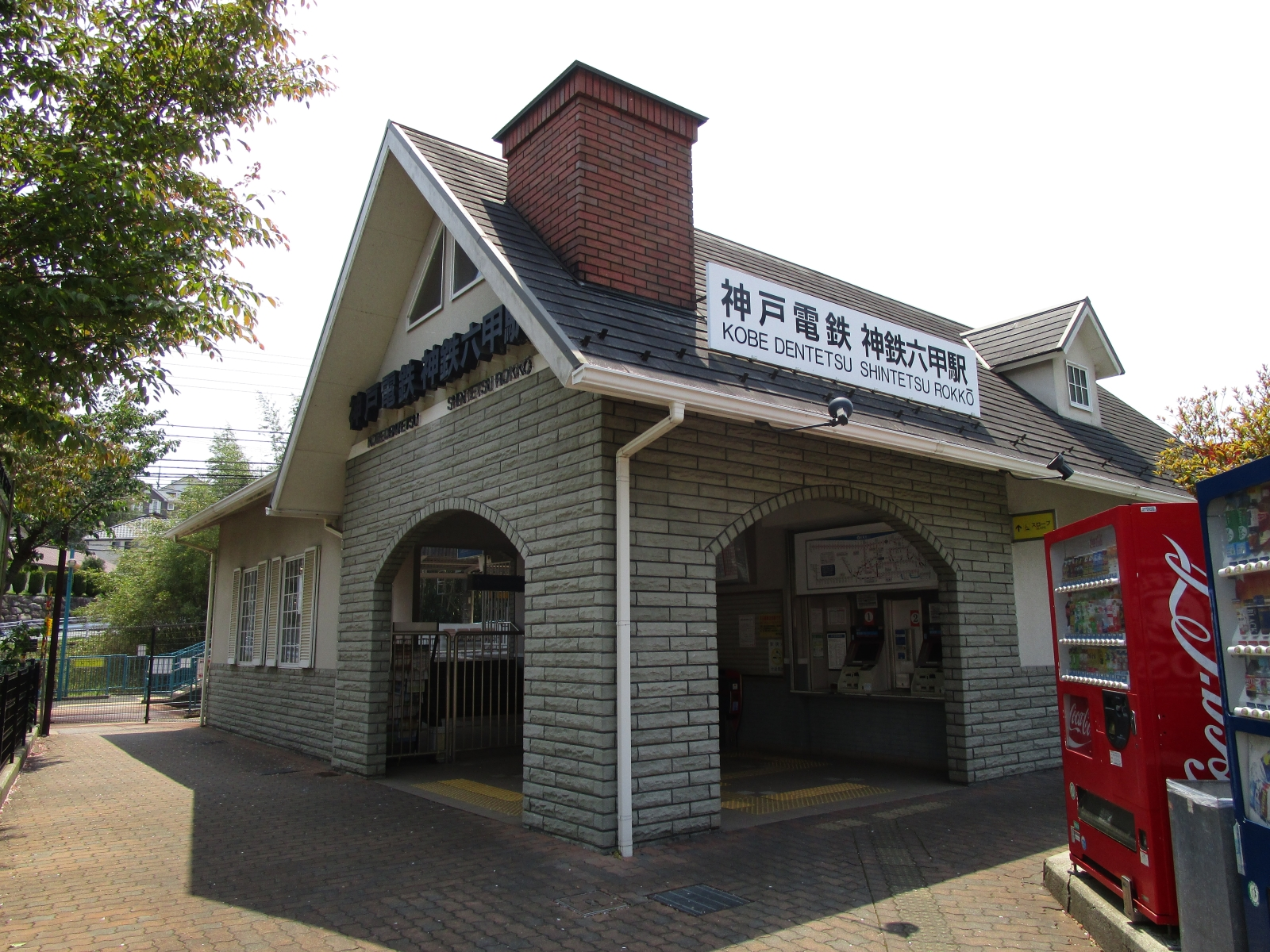
- Station building in 2018

General information
- Location: Karato Arinocho, Kita-ku, Kobe-shi Hyōgo-ken 651-1331; Japan
- Coordinates: 34°47′7.99″N 135°12′23.90″E
- Operator: Kobe Electric Railway (Shintetsu)
- Line: Shintetsu Arima Line
- Distance: 18.1 km (11.2 miles) from Minatogawa
- Platforms: 2 side platforms

Other information
- Status: Unstaffed
- Station code: KB13
- Website: Official website

History
- Opened: 11 November 1928
- Former names: Rokkō Kitaguchi (to 1929), Rokkō Tozanguchi (to 1988)

Passengers
- FY2019: 1,128 (daily)
Location
- Location within Hyōgo Prefecture Location within Japan

Shintetsu Rokkō Station (神鉄六甲駅, Shintetsu Rokkō-eki) is a passenger railway station located in Kita-ku Kobe, Hyōgo Prefecture, Japan. It is operated by the private transportation company, Kobe Electric Railway (Shintetsu).

== Lines ==
Shintetsu Rokkō Station is served by the Shintetsu Arima Line, and is located 18.1 kilometers from the terminus of the line at Minatogawa and 18.53 kilometers from Shinkaichi.

== Station layout ==
The station consists of two ground-level unnumbered side platforms, connected to the station building by a level crossing.

=== Platforms ===
| station side | ■ Shintetsu Arima Line | for Arimaguchi and Arima Onsen and Sanda |
| opposite side | ■ Shintetsu Arima Line | for Minatogawa and Shinkaichi |

== Adjacent stations ==
| « | Service | » |
Shintetsu Arima Line
Special Rapid Express: Does not stop at this station
Express: Does not stop at this station
| Oike | Semi-Express | Karatodai |
| Oike | Local | Karatodai |

== History ==
The station was opened on November 28, 1928, as Rokkō Kitaguchi Station (六甲北口駅). It was renamed Rokkō Tozanguchi Station (六甲登山口駅) on October 10, 1929, and renamed to its present name on April 1, 1988.

== Passenger statistics ==
In fiscal 2019, the station was used by an average of 1,128 passengers daily.

== Surrounding area ==
The surrounding area is a residential area.

== See also ==
- List of railway stations in Japan
