= Ōike Station =

Railway station in Kobe, Japan

KB12 Ōike Station 大池駅
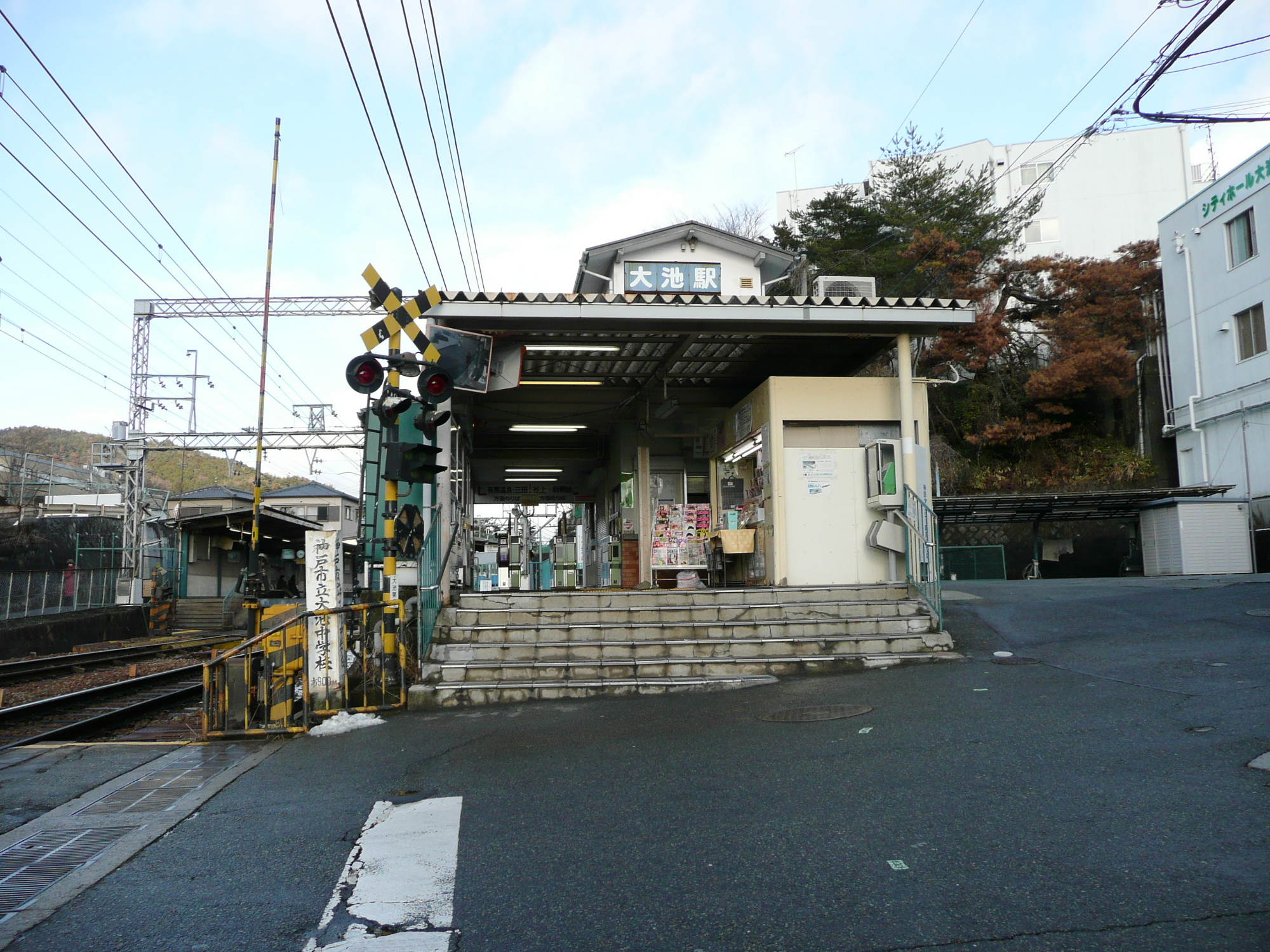
- Station building in 2008

General information
- Location: 1-2-5 Nishi-Ōike, Kita-ku, Kobe-shi Hyōgo-ken 651-1332; Japan
- Coordinates: 34°46′50″N 135°11′54″E
- Operator: Kobe Electric Railway (Shintetsu)
- Line: Shintetsu Arima Line
- Distance: 17.1 km (10.6 miles) from Minatogawa
- Platforms: 2 side platforms

Other information
- Status: Unstaffed
- Station code: KB12
- Website: Official website

History
- Opened: 28 November 1928

Passengers
- FY2019: 3,281
Location
- Location within Hyōgo Prefecture Location within Japan

Ōike Station (大池駅, Ōike-eki) is a passenger railway station located in Kita-ku Kobe, Hyōgo Prefecture, Japan. It is operated by the private transportation company, Kobe Electric Railway (Shintetsu).

== Lines ==
Ōike Station is served by the Shintetsu Arima Line, and is located 17.1 kilometers from the terminus of the line at Minatogawa and 17.5 kilometers from Shinkaichi.

== Station layout ==
The station consists of two ground-level unnumbered side platforms, connected to the station building by a level crossing.

=== Platforms ===
station side	■ Shintetsu Arima Line	for Minatogawa and Shinkaichi
opposite side	■ Shintetsu Arima Line	for Arimaguchi and Arima Onsen and Sanda

== Adjacent stations ==
«	Service	»
Shintetsu Arima Line
Special Rapid Express: Does not stop at this station
Tanigami	Express	Karatodai
Hanayama	Semi-Express	Shintetsu Rokko
Hanayama	Local	Shintetsu Rokko

== History ==
The station was opened on November 28, 1928

== Passenger statistics ==
In fiscal 2019, the station was used by an average of 3,281 passengers daily

== Surrounding area ==
The surrounding area is a residential area developed before World War II.

== See also ==
- List of railway stations in Japan
