= Minotani Station =

Railway station in Kobe, Japan

KB09 Minotani Station 箕谷駅
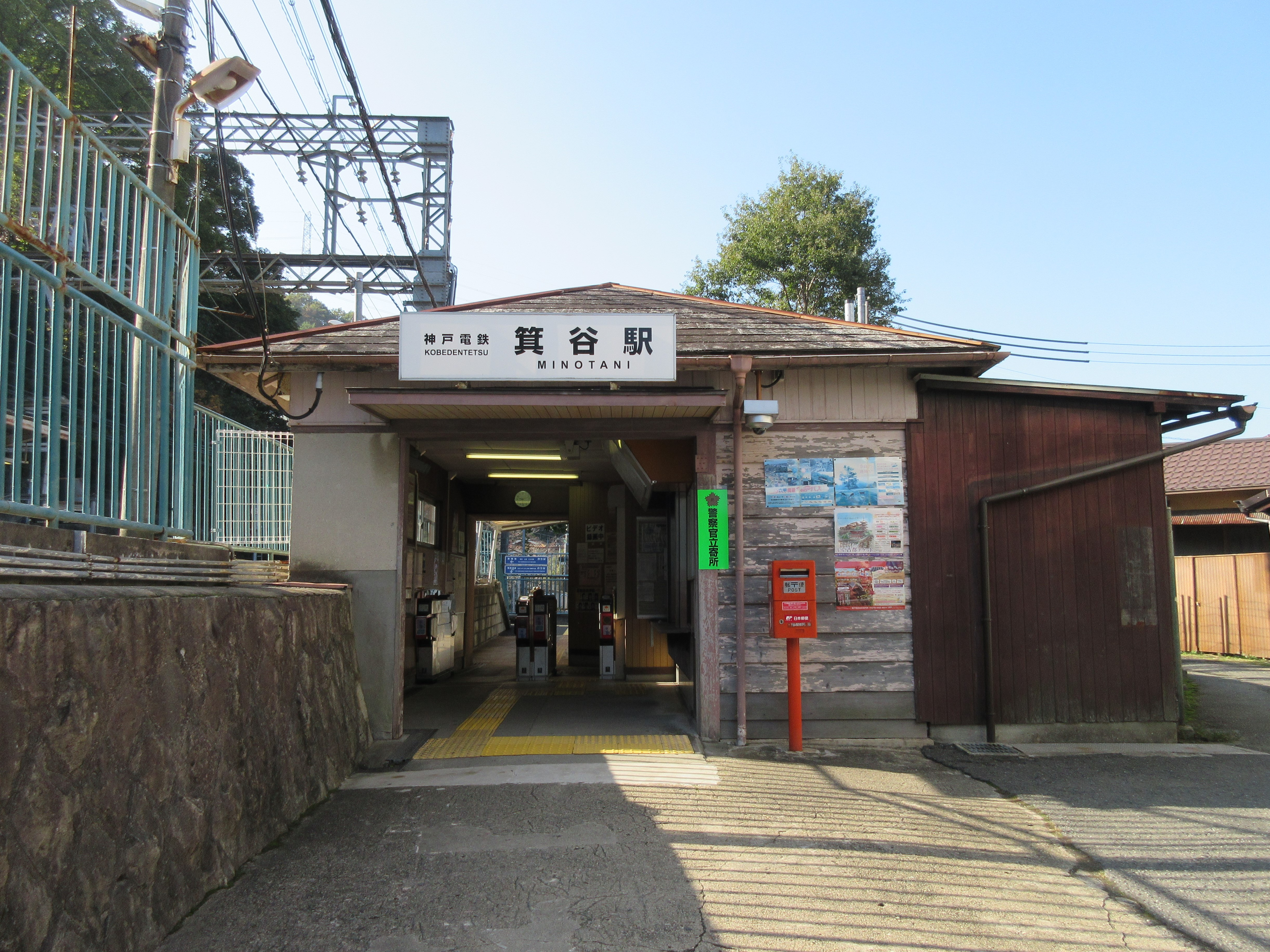
- Station building in November 2018

General information
- Location: Yamadacho Shimotanigami, Kita-ku, Kobe-shi Hyōgo-ken 651-1243; Japan
- Coordinates: 34°45′24.88″N 135°9′20.76″E
- Operator: Kobe Electric Railway (Shintetsu)
- Line: Shintetsu Arima Line
- Distance: 12.0 km (7.5 miles) from Minatogawa
- Platforms: 2 side platforms

Other information
- Status: Unstaffed
- Station code: KB09
- Website: Official website

History
- Opened: 28 November 1928

Passengers
- FY2019: 1,085
Location
- Location within Hyōgo Prefecture Location within Japan

Minotani Station (箕谷駅, Minotani-eki) is a passenger railway station located in Kita-ku Kobe, Hyōgo Prefecture, Japan. It is operated by the private transportation company, Kobe Electric Railway (Shintetsu).

== Lines ==
Minotani Station is served by the Shintetsu Arima Line, and is located 12.0 kilometers from the terminus of the line at Minatogawa and 12.4 kilometers from Shinkaichi.

== Station layout ==
The station consists of two ground-level unnumbered side platforms, connected to the station building by a level crossing.

=== Platforms ===
station side	■ Shintetsu Arima Line	for Arimaguchi and Arima Onsen and Sanda
opposite side	■ Shintetsu Arima Line	for Minatogawa and Shinkaichi

== Adjacent stations ==
«	Service	»
Shintetsu Arima Line
Special Rapid Express: Does not stop at this station
Express: Does not stop at this station
Yamanomachi	Semi-Express	Tanigami
Yamanomachi	Local	Tanigami

== History ==
The station was opened on November 28, 1928.

== Passenger statistics ==
In fiscal 2019, the station was used by an average of 1,085 passengers daily

== Surrounding area ==
- Japan National Route 428 (Arima Highway)

== See also ==
- List of railway stations in Japan
