= Tosen Goshobo =

Hot spring ryokan in Japan

Coordinates: 34.7968°N 135.2470°E

Tosen Goshobō (Japanese: 陶泉 御所坊) is a historic 20-room ryokan (Japanese inn) in Arima Onsen, Hyōgo Prefecture, Japan. The location has a history spanning over 800 years as a place for lodging (since the 12th century) and has onsen (baths) that are supplied by natural hot springs.

The hot springs were discovered over 1,500 years ago. The water has a high iron content that stain the baths at Tosen Goshobo a terra-cotta color. Part of the inn's name, "tosen," is attributed to the baths' coloration, which means "clay spring" in Japanese. The water temperature is around 200 °F (93.33 °C).
