= Shintetsu Kobe Kosoku Line =

Railway line in Japan

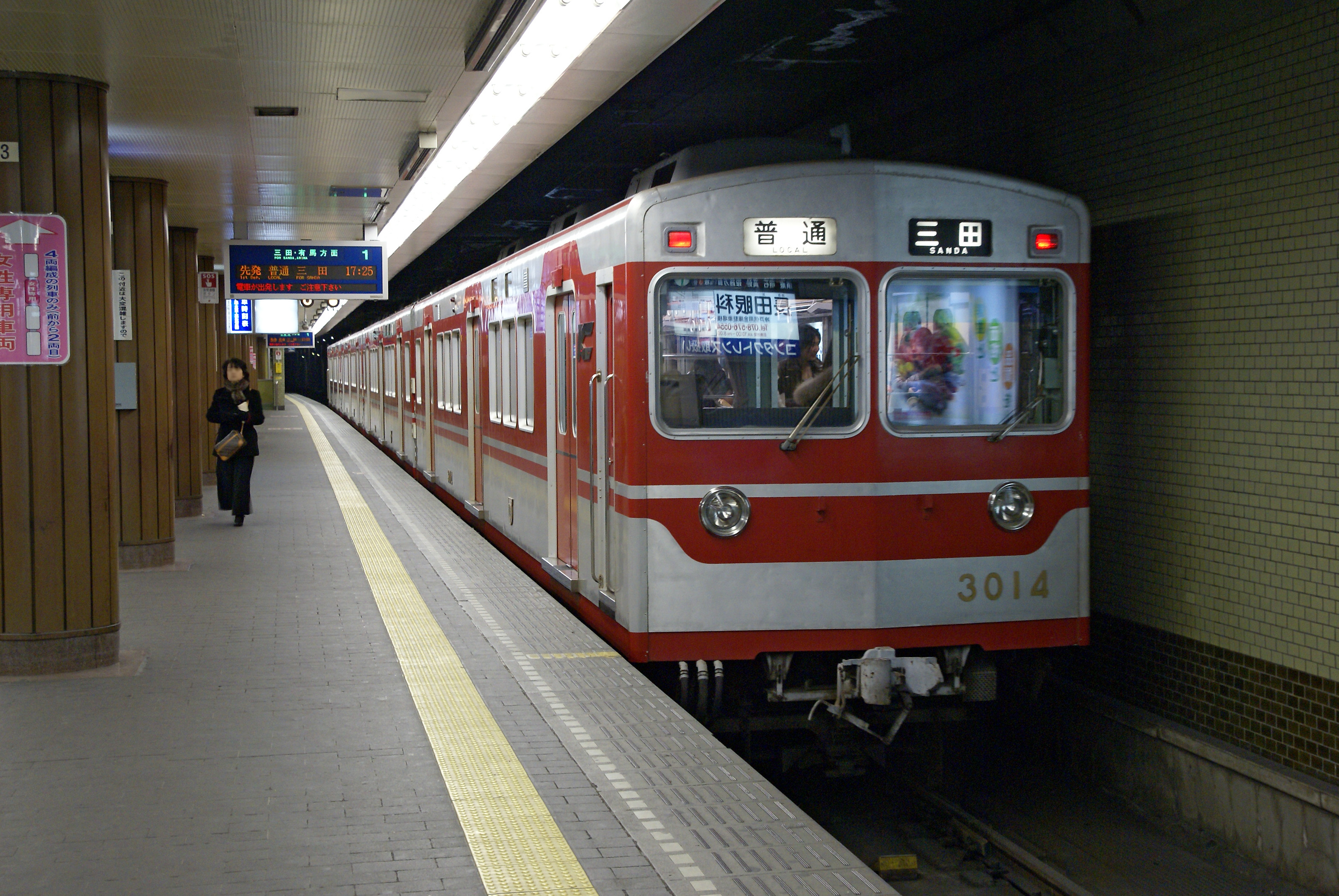
Namboku Line

The Shintetsu Kobe Kosoku Line (神戸電鉄神戸高速線 Kōbe Dentetsu Kōbe Kōsoku sen) is one of two lines owned by the Kobe Rapid Transit Railway (0.4 km). It is operated by Kobe Electric Railway and has only two stations. This short stretch of track, opened in 1968 is important as it connects the Arima Line to Shinkaichi, allowing Shintetsu passengers to transfer directly to Hankyū and Hanshin trains bound for Kobe Sannomiya and Umeda (Osaka), and Sanyo line trains bound for Himeji. As it is only used by Shintetsu rolling stock, the line is narrow-gauge.

== Stations ==
No.	Station		Distance from Shinkaichi (km)	Connections	Location
KB01	Shinkaichi	新開地	0.0	Hanshin - Hankyu Kobe Kosoku Line (Tozai Line) (HS 36)	Hyogo-ku, Kobe
KB02	Minatogawa	湊川	0.4	Kobe Subway Seishin-Yamate Line (S06: Minatogawa-Koen Station); Shintetsu Arima Line (Through Service)	Hyogo-ku, Kobe
↓ Through service to/from ↓ Ao via the Shintetsu Arima Line and the Ao Line Sanda via the Shintetsu Arima Line and the Sanda Line
