= Yokoteyama Skylator =

Outdoor moving walkway in Nagano Prefecture, Japan

The Yokoteyama Skylator (横手山スカイレーター, Yokoteyama Sukairētā) is an outdoor moving walkway located in Yamanouchi, Nagano, Japan. Together with Sky Pair Lift & Shibu Pass Romance Lift (ski lifts), it allows visitors to reach the summit of Mt. Yokote (Yokoteyama in Japanese), an altitude of 2,307 metres (7,569 feet), without hiking. It operates seasonally, typically from April to November, avoiding winter closures due to heavy snowfall.

The Skylator is 200 metres (660 feet) long with an elevation gain of 35 metres (115 feet), and a travel time of 5 minutes.

On weekdays the Skylator operates alternately in both directions, but on weekends and busy holiday periods it only operates uphill requiring use of the ski lifts and a free shuttle bus to do a round trip to the summit of Mt. Yotoke and return to the bottom of the Skylator.

The Skylator may appear to be a type of funicular but, similar to slope cars, is not legally classified as a railway in Japan and is instead classified as an incline elevator.

== See also ==
- Slope car
- List of aerial lifts in Japan
