= Arima Onsen =

Onsen in Kobe, Japan

Coordinates: 34°47′53″N 135°14′51″E

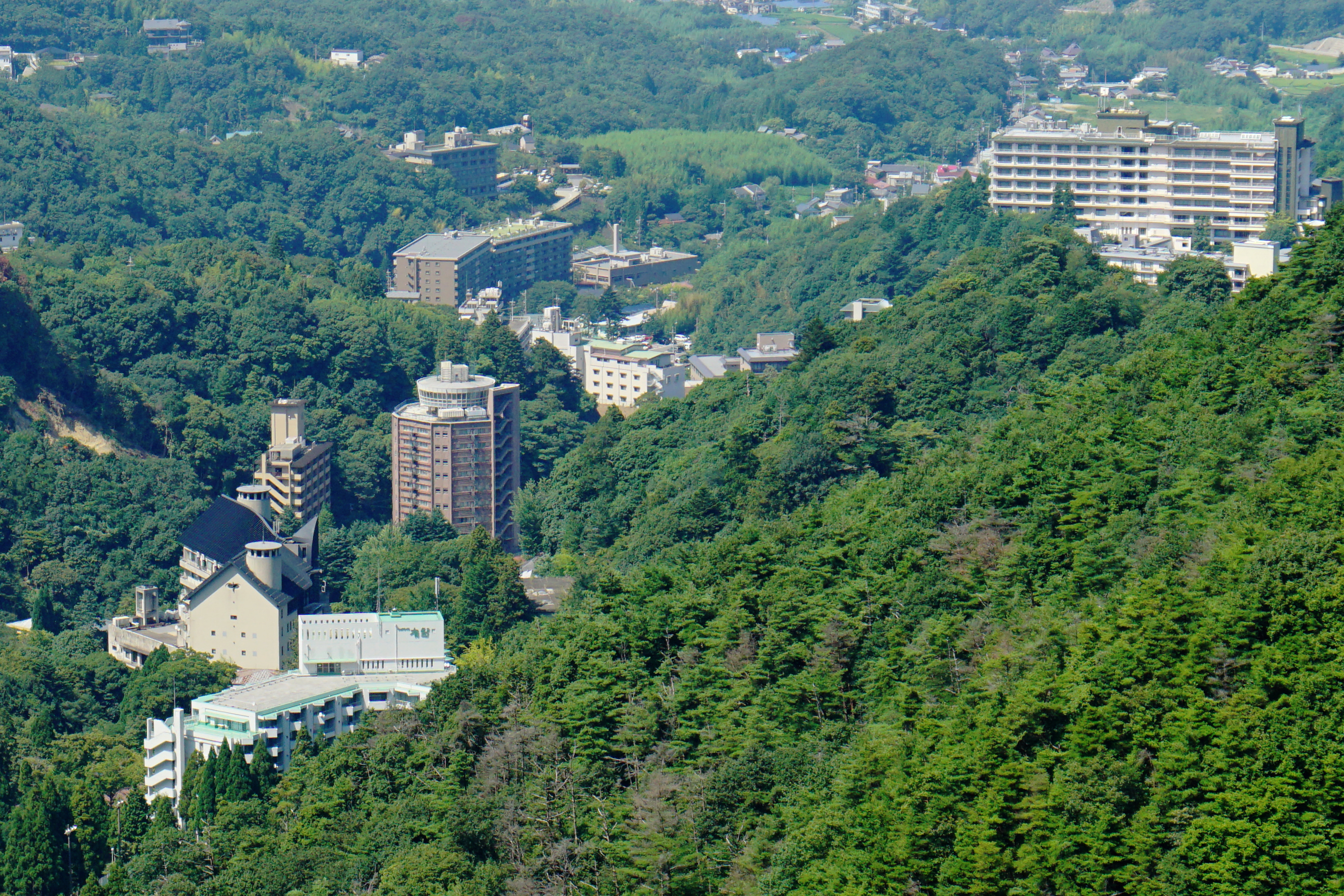
Arima Onsen Town

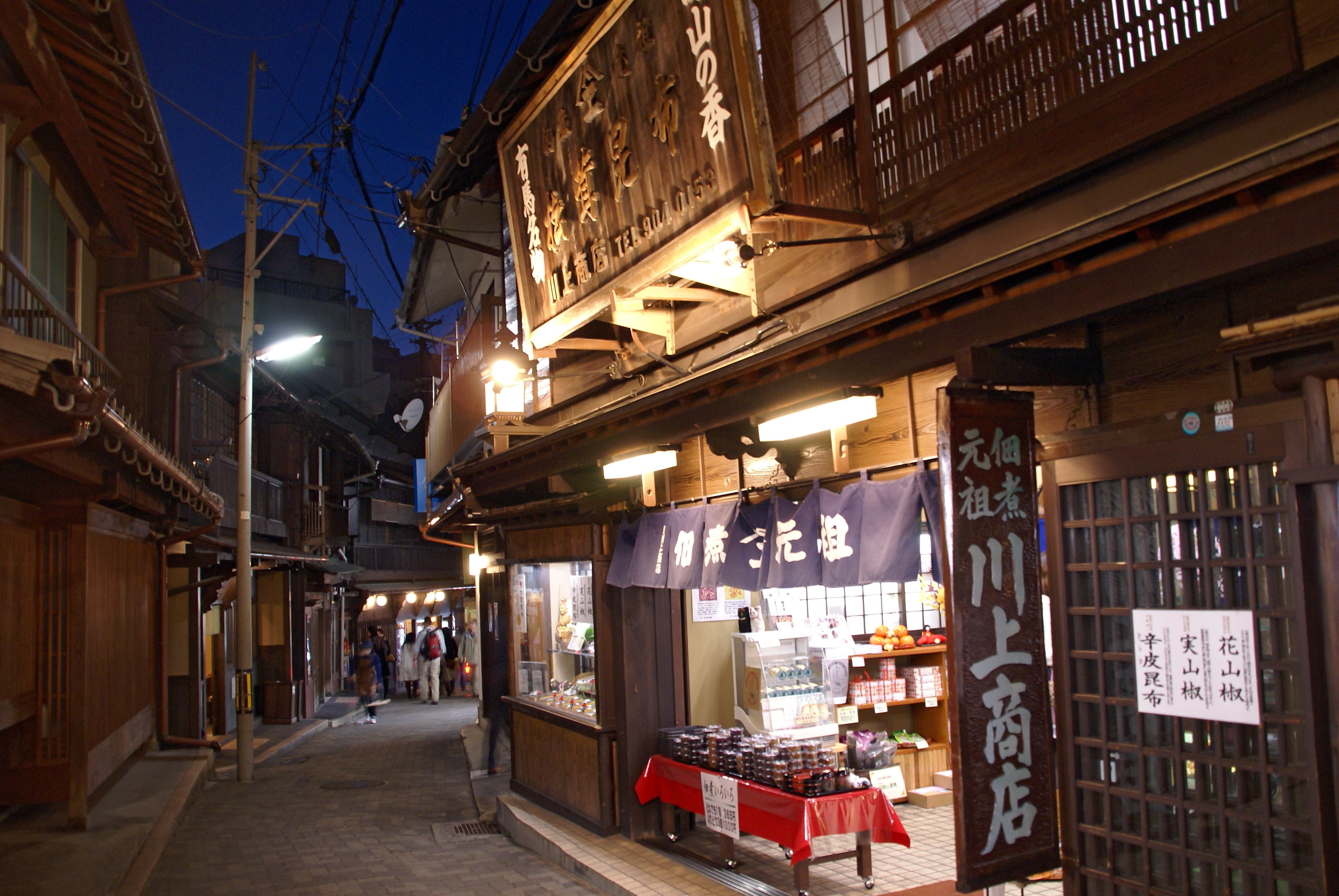
Yumotozaka street

Arima Onsen (有馬温泉, Arima Onsen) is an onsen, or hot spring resort in Kita-ku, Kobe, Japan, located near Mount Rokkō. This onsen attracts many Japanese because of its easy access from the busy cities in the Kansai metropolitan area including Osaka and Kobe. Arima Onsen was named in the Heian-period The Pillow Book as one of the three famous springs in Japan. It was selected as the most prestigious hot spring during the Edo period.

== History ==
This onsen is one of Japan's oldest, with Dōgo Onsen in Ehime Prefecture and Nanki-Shirahama Onsen in Wakayama Prefecture. Many documents since the 8th century AD, such as The Pillow Book, mention this onsen.

According to these documents, among the many visitors to Arima Onsen are Gyoki (行基), a charismatic Buddhist monk in the 7th century, and Ninsai (仁西), another monk in the 12th century. Ninsai was said to greatly admire Arima Onsen and helped develop it. Hideyoshi Toyotomi visited this onsen several times in the 16th century.

== Springs ==
Arima Onsen has two kinds of spring. One is kinsen (金泉, "gold spring"), which has water colored yellow-brown from iron and salt. The other is ginsen (銀泉, "silver spring"), which is colorless and contains radium and carbonate.

== Accommodation ==
In 2007, there were more than 20 hotels and inns in the Arima Onsen area.

== Gallery ==
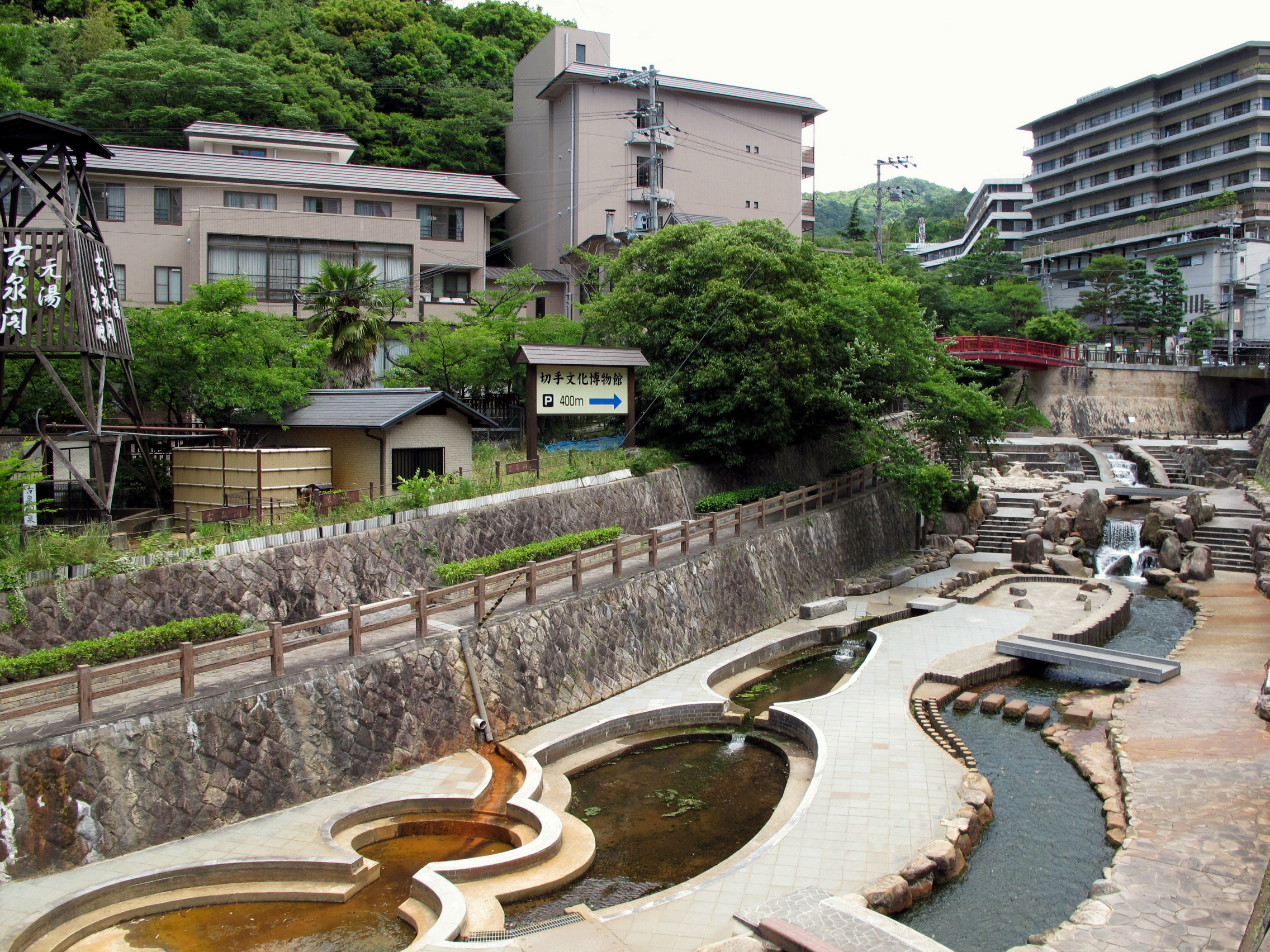
Arima Onsen River 2013

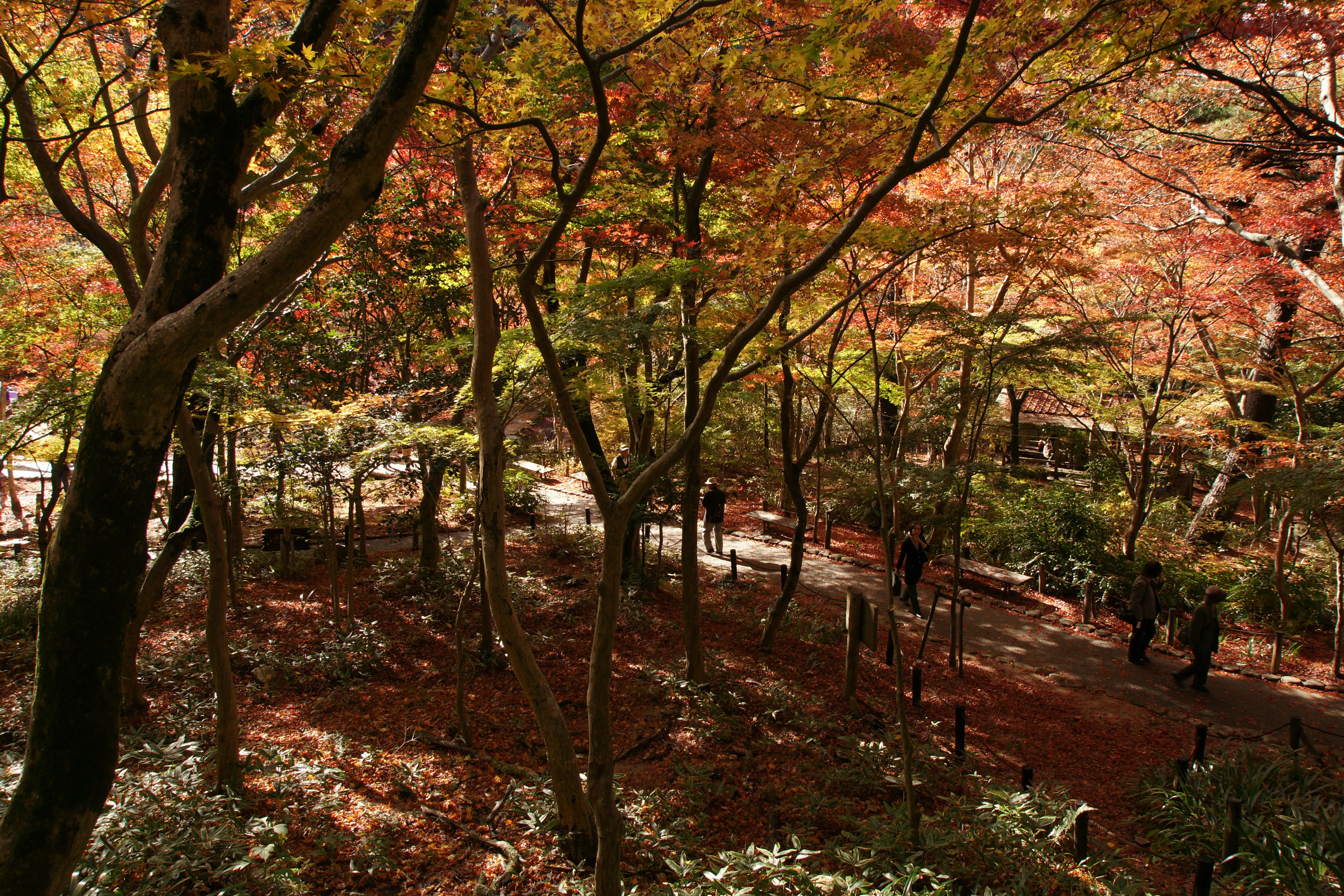
Zuihoji Park

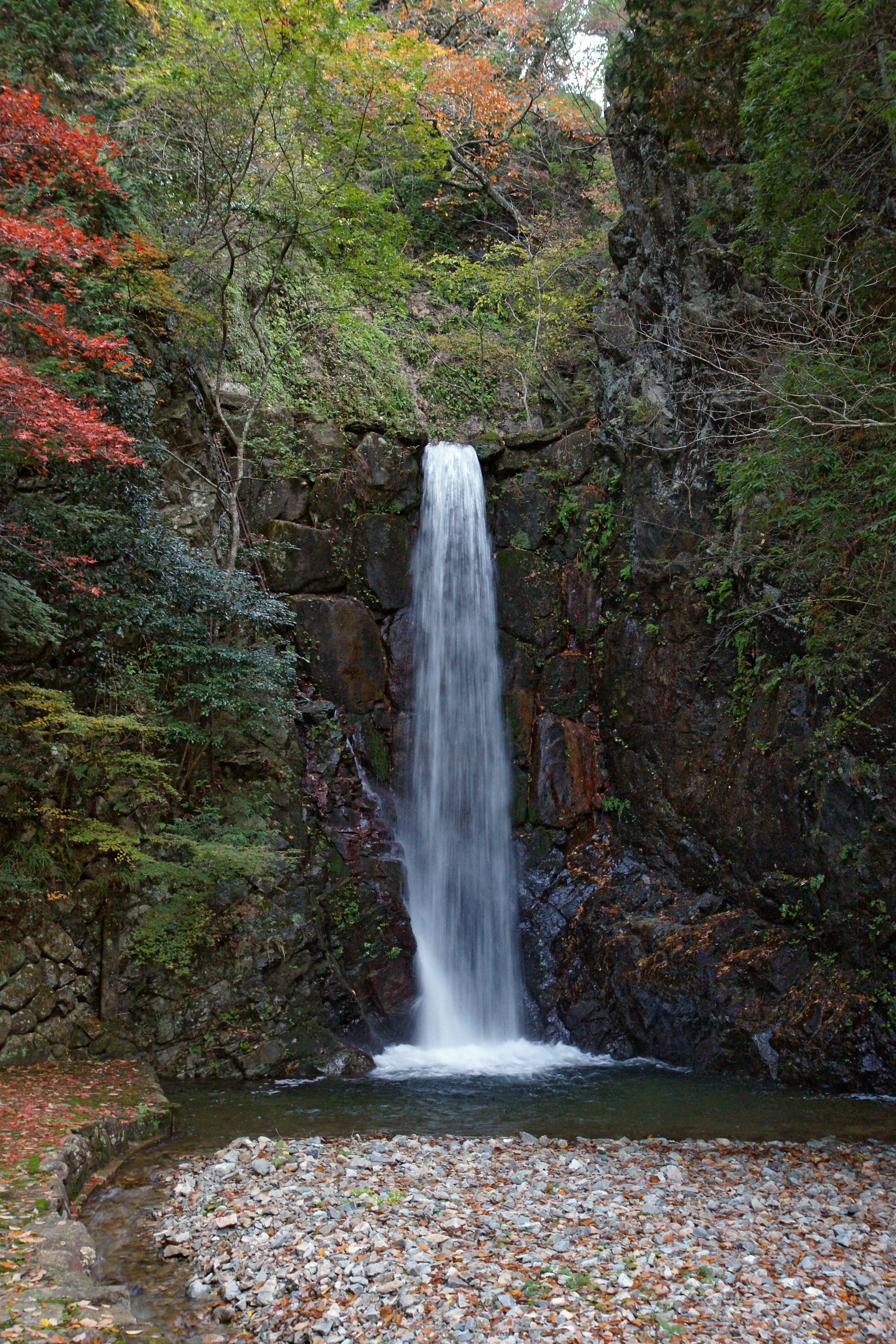
Tudumi-ga-taki Park

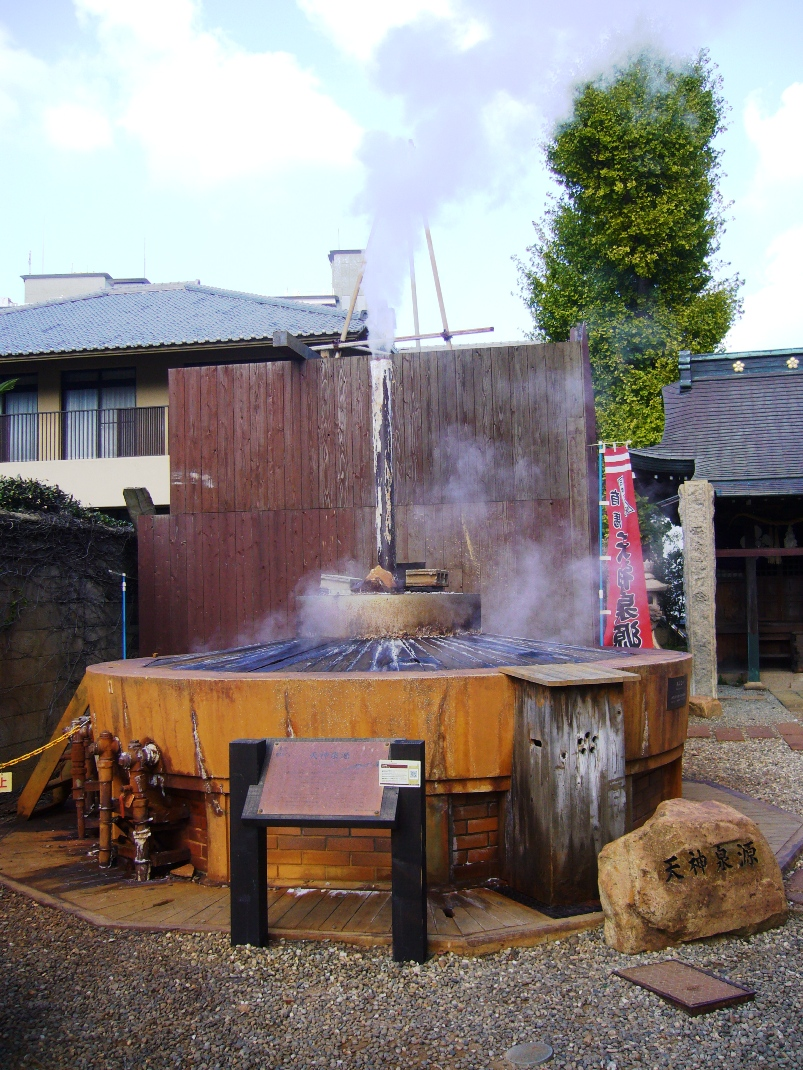
Arima Onsen Tenjin Sengen

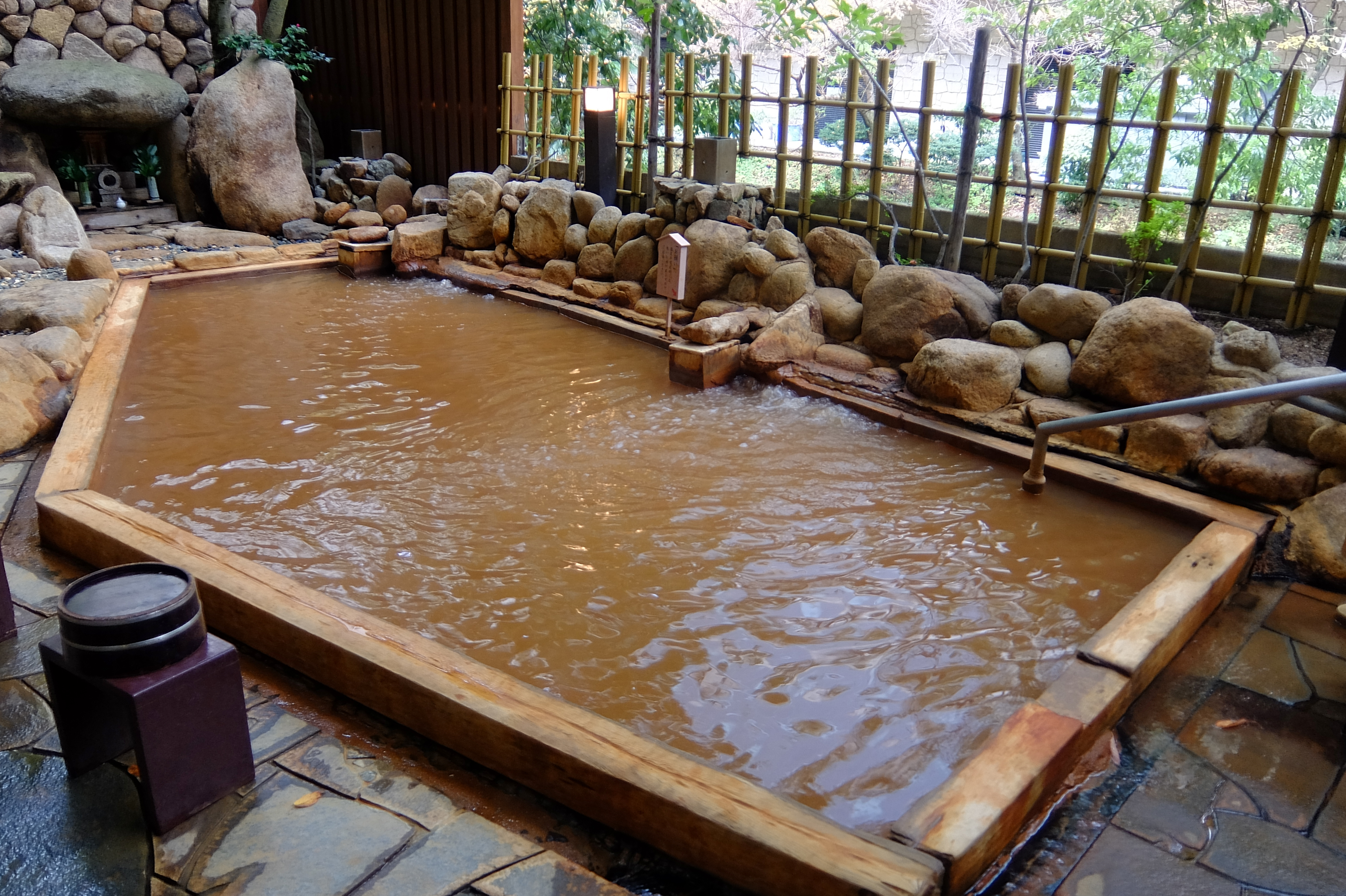
Gekkoen Yugetsusanso, Arima Onsen

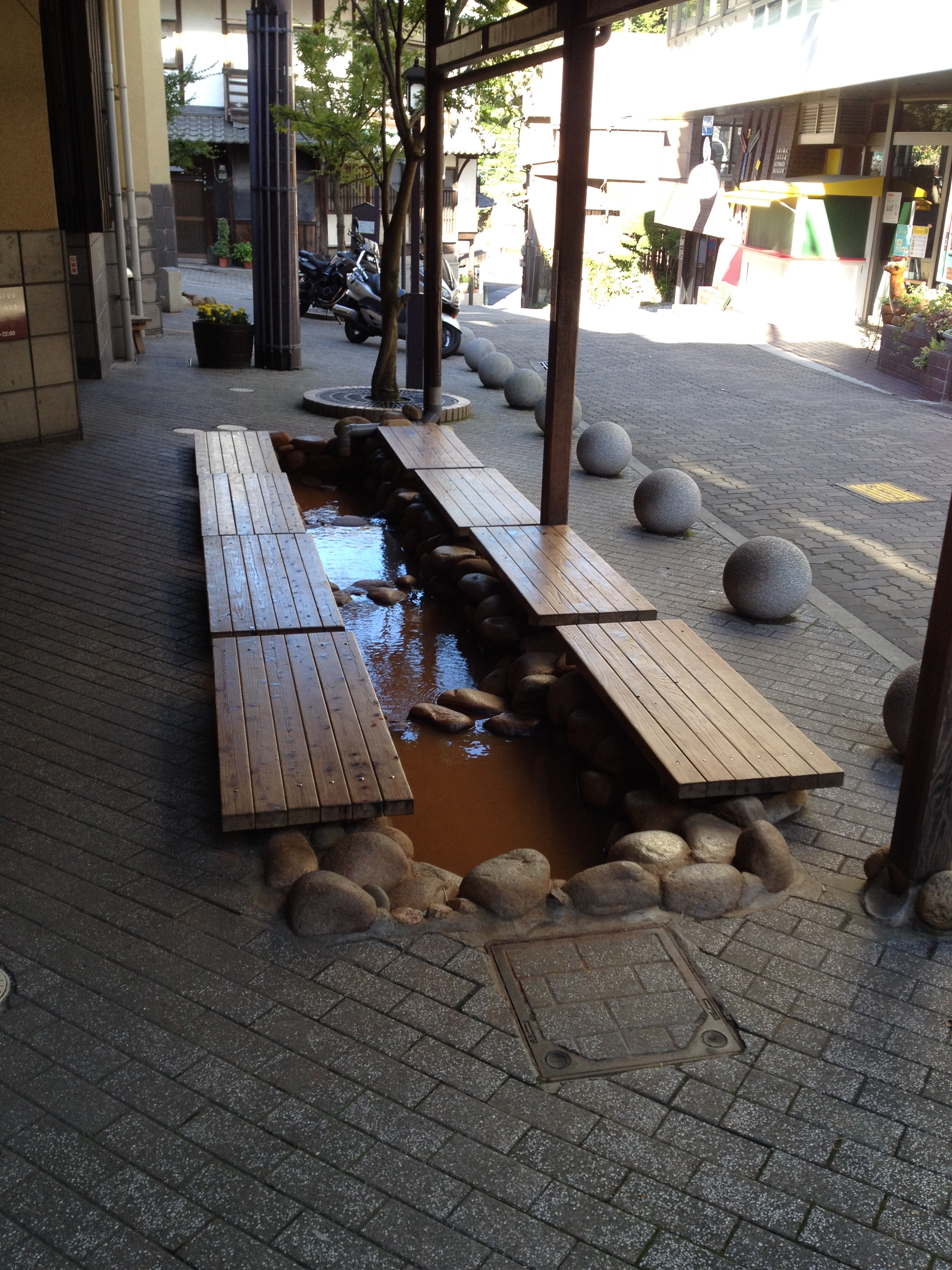
Public foot bath Arima Onsen

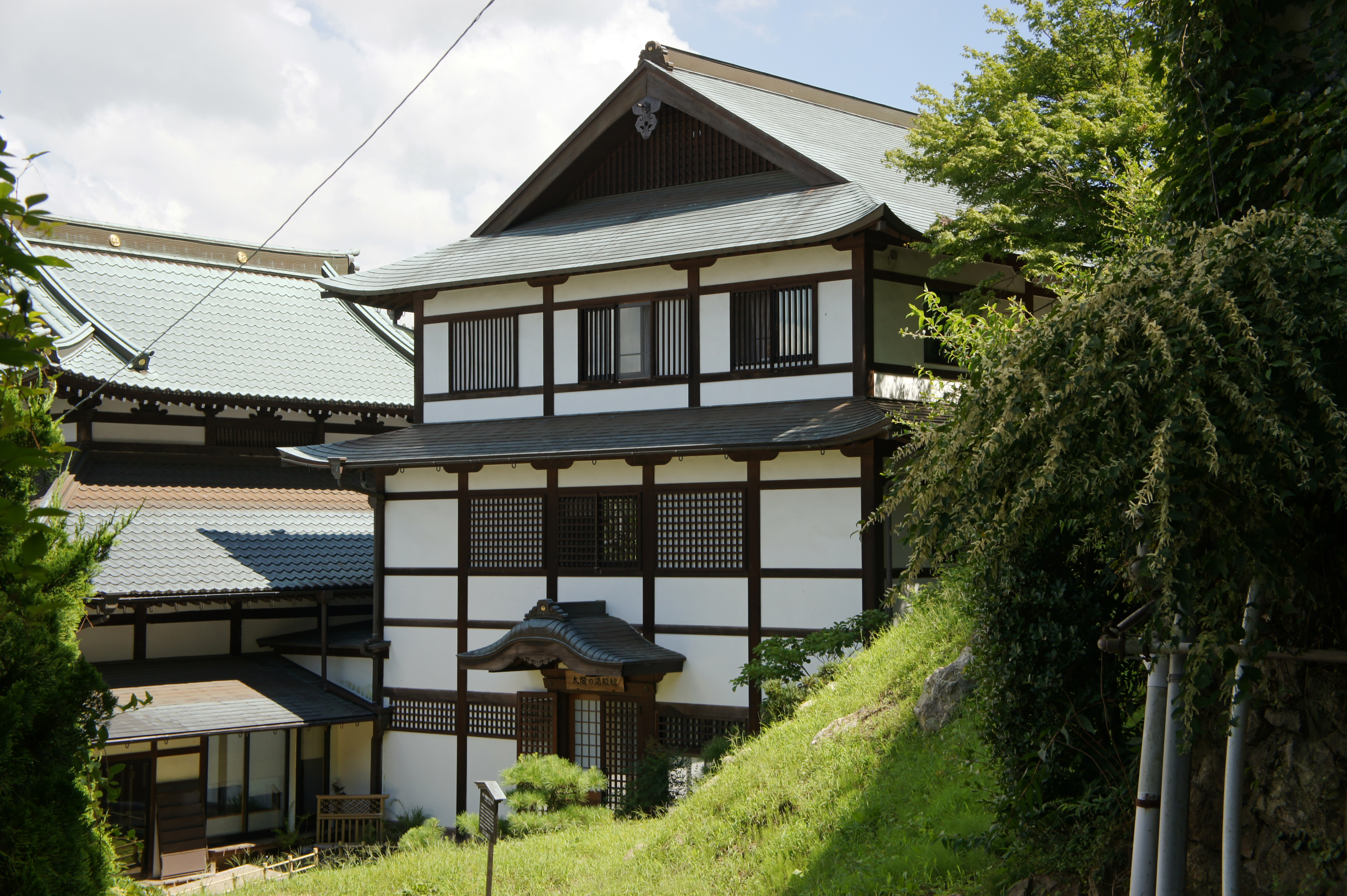
Taiko-no-yudonokan municipal museum

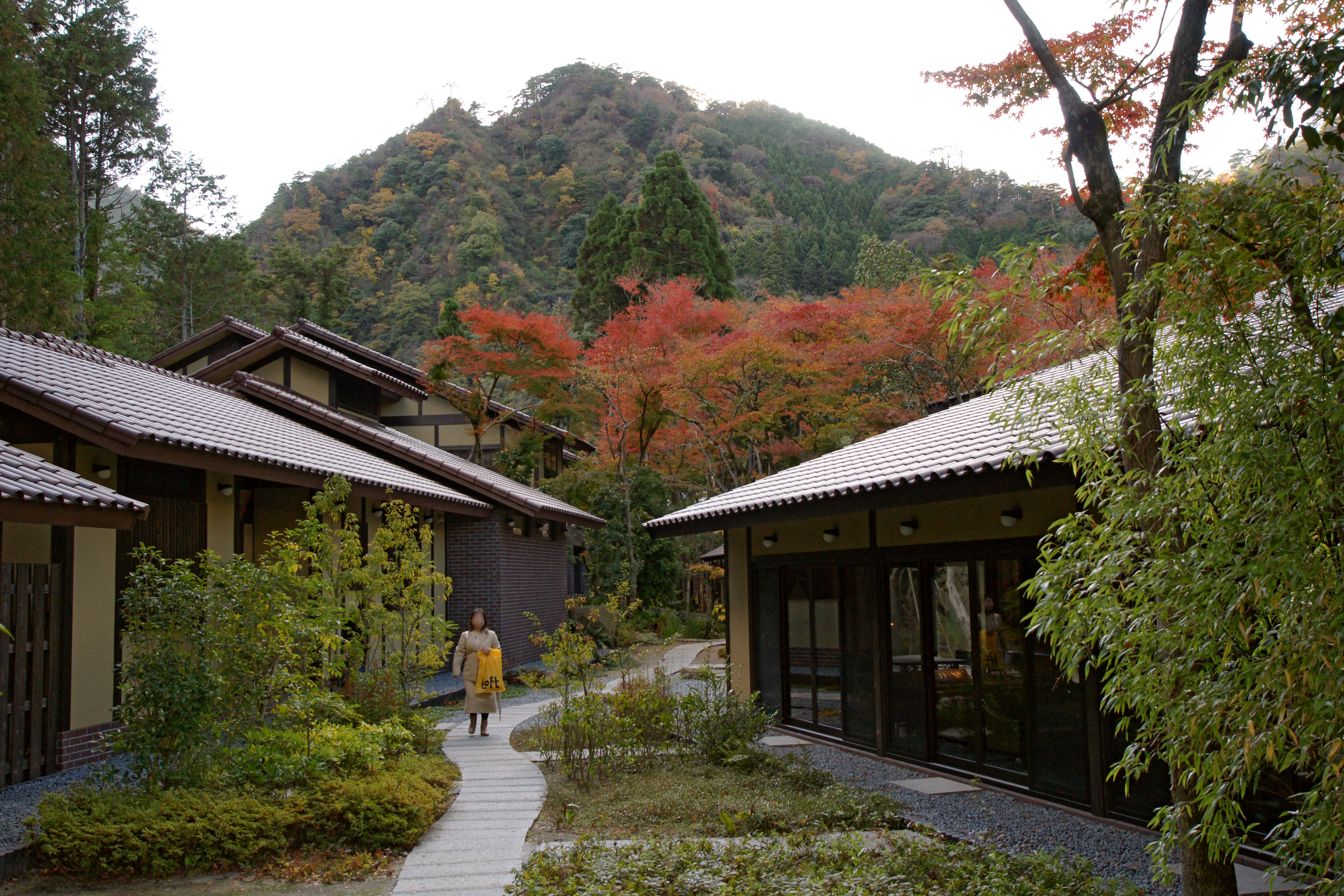
Typical ryokan in Arima

== See also ==
- List of hot springs in Japan
- Tosen Goshobo – an historic ryokan (Japanese inn) located in Arima Onsen
- Three Ancient Springs
