= Arima Onsen Station =

Railway station in Kobe, Japan

Arima Onsen Station 有馬温泉駅
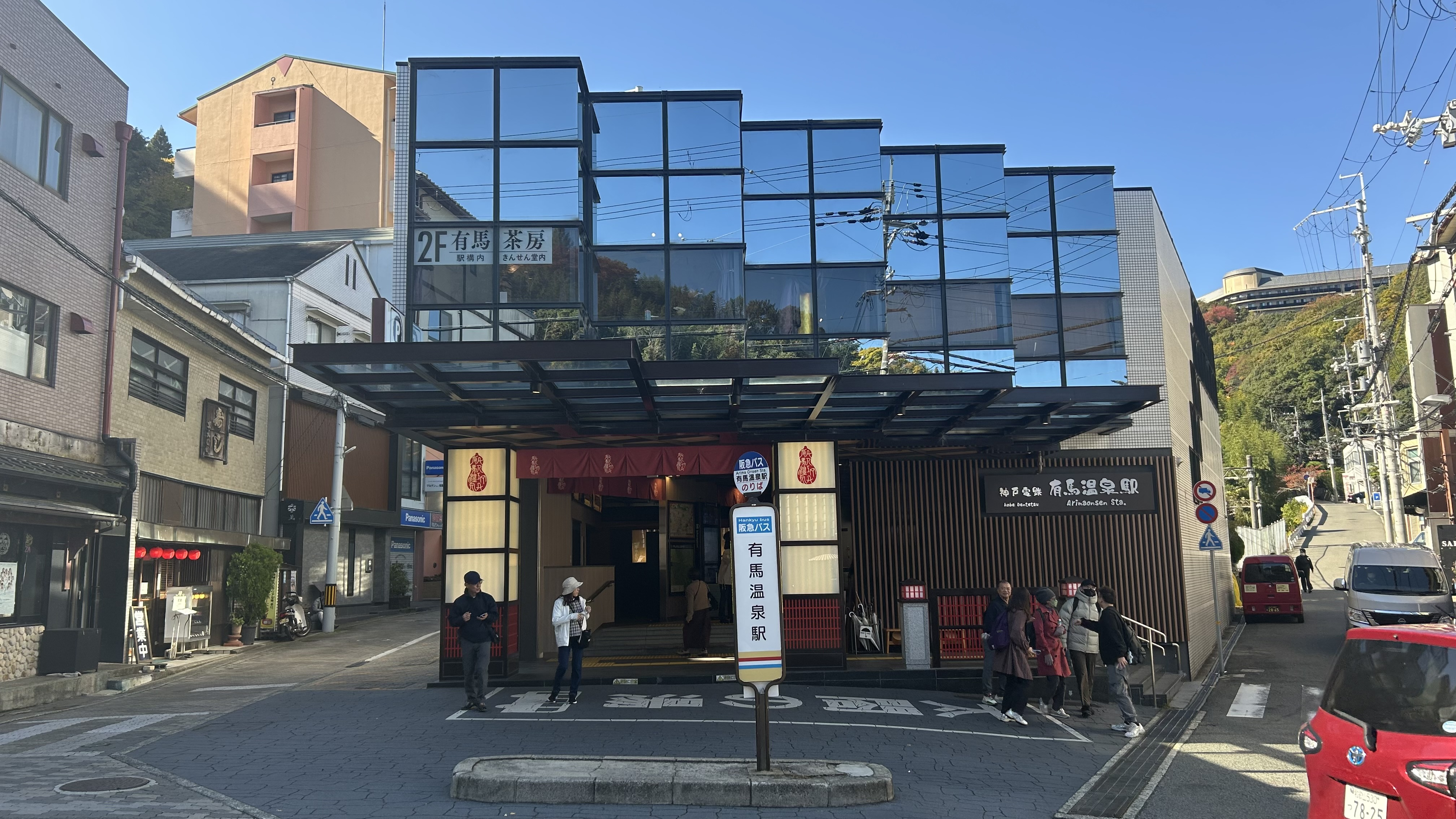
- Arima Onsen Station

General information
- Location: 266-2, Arima-chō Aza Utsugidani, Kita, Kobe, Hyōgo （神戸市北区有馬町字ウツギ谷266-2） Japan
- Coordinates: 34°47′58″N 135°14′45″E
- Operator: Kobe Electric Railway
- Line: Arima Line
- Connections: Bus terminal

History
- Opened: 1928
Location

Arima Onsen Station (有馬温泉駅, Arima Onsen-eki) is a railway station on the Shintetsu Arima Line located near Arima Onsen, Kita-ku, Kobe, Hyōgo Prefecture, Japan. It is the end point of the line. It is the highest station of Kobe Electric Railway at an elevation of 357 meters (1,171 ft), as well as its easternmost station.

== History ==
- November 28, 1928 - Station opened as the terminus of the Kobe Arima Electric Railway under the name "Arima Station" (有馬駅, Arima-eki).
- 1929, May or earlier - Station renamed to its current name, Arima Onsen Station.
- January 9, 1947 - Kobe Arima Electric Railway, the station's owner, merges with Miki Electric Railway into Kamiari Miki Electric Railway, today's Kobe Electric Railway.
- October 31, 1989 - The current station building is completed.

== Station layout ==
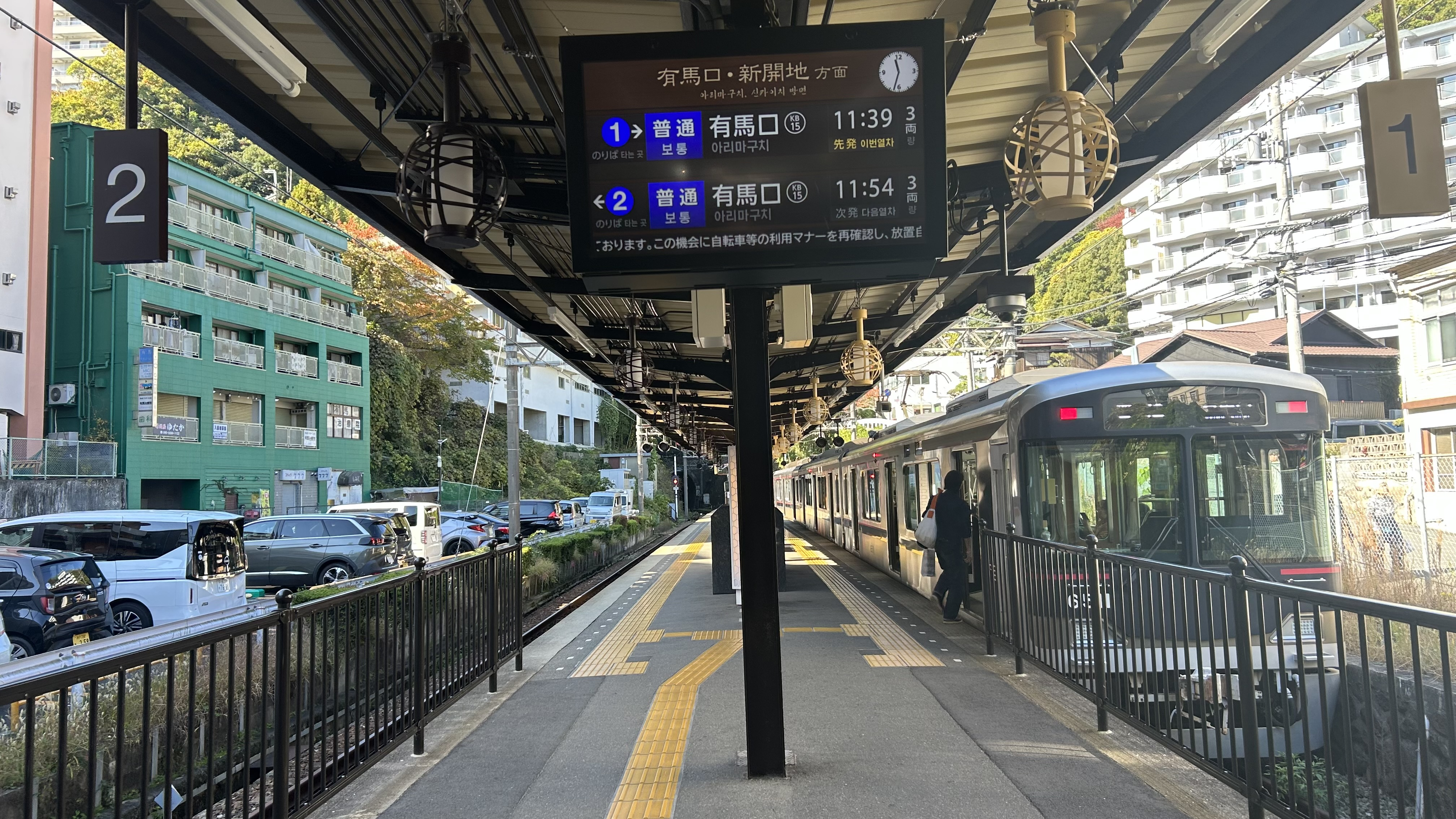
Arimaonsen Station platform

The station has a single island platform with two tracks, each of which can hold a four-car train. Both tracks are used interchangeably. The station building is next to the buffer stops. The original Art Nouveau-style station building was renovated into its current form in 1989.

A freight siding used to exist next to track 2, but has been replaced by a parking lot.

Two three-car trains are stabled at the station at night.

== Usage ==
The following table shows the average number of daily passengers.

Year	Average daily passengers
2007	1,546
2008	1,518
2009	1,463
2010	1,493
2011	1,522
2012	1,562
2013	1,562
2014	1,608
2015	1,702
2016	1,622
2017	1,616
2018	1,477

== Lines ==
- Kobe Electric Railway
  - Arima Line

== Adjacent stations ==
«	Service	»
Shintetsu Arima Line
Arimaguchi	Semi-Express	Terminus
Arimaguchi	Local	Terminus
