= List of places of scenic beauty of Japan (Ishikawa) =

This list is of the places of scenic beauty of Japan located within the Prefecture of Ishikawa.

== National Places of Scenic Beauty ==
As of 1 June 2026, eleven Places have been designated at a national level (including one *Special Place of Scenic Beauty); Landscape of Oku no Hosomichi is a serial designation spanning ten prefectures.

Site	Municipality	Comments	Image	Coordinates	Type	Ref.
*Kenroku-en 兼六園; Kenroku-en	Kanazawa			36°33′44″N 136°39′45″E	1	
Former Matsunami Castle Gardens 旧松波城庭園; Kyū-Matsunami-jō teien	Noto			37°21′18″N 137°14′28″E	1	
Tokikuni Family Gardens 時国氏庭園; Tokikuni-shi teien	Wajima			37°27′01″N 137°04′42″E	1	
Upper Tokikuni Family Gardens 上時国氏庭園; Kami-Tokikuni-shi teien	Wajima			37°26′52″N 137°04′49″E	1	
Seisonkaku Gardens 成巽閣庭園; Seisonkaku teien	Kanazawa			36°33′41″N 136°39′49″E	1	
Sosogi Coast 曽々木海岸; Sosogi-kaigan	Wajima	also a Natural Monument		37°27′42″N 137°04′47″E	8	
Nata-dera Kuritei Gardens 那谷寺庫裡庭園; Natedera Kuritei-en	Komatsu			36°18′46″N 136°25′13″E	1	
Shiroyone Senmaida 白米の千枚田; Shiroyone no Senmaida	Wajima			37°25′31″N 137°00′03″E	3, 4, 11	
Sue Water Purification Facility 末浄水場園地; Sue jōsuijō enchi	Kanazawa			36°33′28″N 136°39′35″E	1	
Landscape of Oku no Hosomichi - Nata-dera Precinct おくのほそ道の風景地 那谷寺境内; Oku no Hosomichi no fūkei-chi Nata-dera keidai	Komatsu	designation spans ten prefectures		36°18′48″N 136°25′13″E		
Nishi Family Gardens 西氏庭園; Nishi-shi teien	Kanazawa			36°33′57″N 136°38′57″E	1	

== Prefectural Places of Scenic Beauty ==
As of 10 October 2025, nine Places have been designated at a prefectural level.

Site	Municipality	Comments	Image	Coordinates	Type	Ref.
Nishida Family Gardens (Gyokusen-en) 西田家庭園; Nishida-ke teien	Kanazawa			36°33′49″N 136°39′50″E		
Raikō-ji Gardens 来迎寺庭園; Raikōji teien	Anamizu			37°13′43″N 136°53′47″E		
Myōjō-ji Gardens 妙成寺庭園; Myōjōji teien	Hakui			36°57′16″N 136°46′34″E		
Futamata Honsen-ji Gardens 二保本泉寺九山八海の庭; Futamata Honsenji kusen-hakkai no niwa	Kanazawa			36°33′31″N 136°45′53″E		
Taira Family Gardens 平家庭園; Taira-ke teien	Shika			37°00′26″N 136°45′36″E		
Oyama Jinja Gardens 尾山神社庭園 (旧金谷御殿庭園); Oyama Jinja teien (kyū-Kanaya goten teien)	Kanazawa			36°33′59″N 136°39′21″E		
Name Falls 男女滝; Name-taki	Wajima			37°21′00″N 136°47′36″E		
Oke Falls 桶滝; Oke-daki	Wajima	also a Prefectural Natural Monument		37°22′14″N 136°48′34″E		
Mitsukejima 見附島; Name-taki	Suzu	also a Prefectural Natural Monument		37°23′47″N 137°14′50″E		

== Municipal Places of Scenic Beauty ==
As of 1 May 2025, thirty-six Places have been designated at a municipal level.

== Registered Places of Scenic Beauty ==
As of 19 June 2026, three Monuments have been registered (as opposed to designated) as a Place of Scenic Beauty at a national level.

Place	Municipality	Comments	Image	Coordinates	Type	Ref.
Hōshi Gardens 法師庭園; Hōshi teien	Komatsu			36°19′54″N 136°26′52″E		
Hiraki Family Gardens 平木氏庭園; Hiraki-shi teien	Kanazawa			36°33′03″N 136°39′47″E		
Yamada Family Gardens 山田氏庭園; Yamada-shi teien	Kanazawa			36°33′48″N 136°39′01″E		
Former Asada Family Gardens (Nomura Residence) 旧浅田氏庭園(武家屋敷跡野村家) kyū-Asada-shi teien (buke yashiki ato Nomura-ke)	Kanazawa			36°33′51″N 136°39′00″E		

== See also ==
- Cultural Properties of Japan
- List of Historic Sites of Japan (Ishikawa)
- List of parks and gardens of Ishikawa Prefecture
