= Nata-dera =

Buddhist temple in Komatsu, Ishikawa, Japan

- 那谷寺
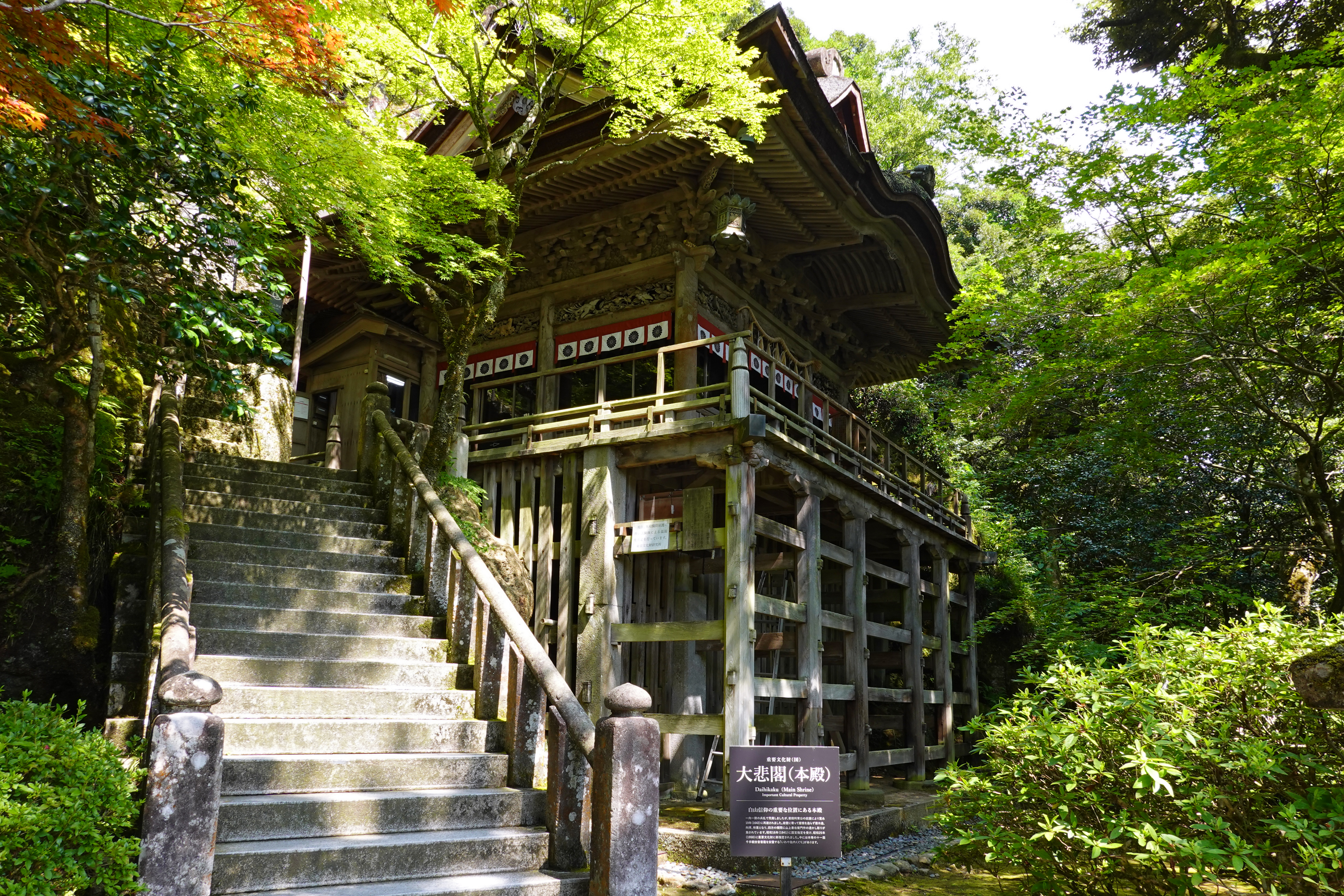
- Nata-dera Hondō

- Location within Ishikawa Prefecture Location within Japan

Religion
- Affiliation: Buddhist
- Deity: Senjū Kannon
- Rite: Kōyasan Shingon-shū
- Status: functional

Location
- Location: 122 Yu, Natani-chō, Komatsu-shi, Ishikawa-ken
- Country: Japan
- Coordinates: 36°18′48.27″N 136°25′13.41″E

Architecture
- Founder: c.Taichō
- Completed: c.707
- National Important Cultural Property National Place of Scenic Beauty

Nata-dera (那谷寺) is a Buddhist temple located in the city of Komatsu, Ishikawa Prefecture, Japan. It belongs to the Kōyasan Shingon-shū sect of Japanese Buddhism and its honzon (primary image) is a hibutsu hidden statue of Senjū Kannon. The temple is connected by tradition to the 33-temple Saigoku Kannon Pilgrimage route, but is not a numbered temple on that pilgrimage. The gardens of the Kuri are designed as a National Place of Scenic Beauty, and the entire precincts are covered by a separate National Place of Scenic Beauty designation as a components of the "Landscape of Oku no Hosomichi "

== History ==
According to legend, the temple was founded by Taichō in the first year of the Yōrō era (717). Taichō was a native of Echizen Province and was also associated with the foundation of Awazu Onsen in 718 and promotion of the Mount Hakusan shugendō mountain cult. Initially the temple was named Iwaya-ji (岩屋寺), as the statue he enshrined here was in a cave or niche in the mountain. In 989, the cloistered Emperor Kazan visited the Hokuriku region and had a dream in which he saw the radiant images of 33 figures of Kannon in a cave. Believing that this meant that all 33 sites of the Saigoku Kannon Pilgrimage were concentrated in this cave, he renamed the temple "Nata-dera", taking one kanji from the sangō names of the first and the thirty-third temples of the pilgrimage. The temple became a training ground for esoteric Buddhist asceticism.

During the Nanboku-chō period and Sengoku periods, Nata-dera was burned down three times, and gradually declined due to the increasing number of people converting to Jōdo Shinshū Buddhism along with the Ikkō-ikki rebellions.

However, in the spring of 1640, the daimyō of Kanazawa Domain Maeda Toshitsune, who had retired to Komatsu, undertook a reconstruction, restoring the main hall, the Karamon gate, the lecture hall, the three-story pagoda, the Goma-dō, the bell tower, and the gardens. During the reconstruction, the approach to Nata-dera was also improved, and cedar trees were planted on both sides. Although Maeda Toshitsune had divided most of Enuma District from Kanazawa to form Daishōji Domain, he retained the area around Nata-dera as his retirement territory and it only became part of Daishōji Domain after his death.

In 1689, Matsuo Basho, on his journey along the Oku no Hosomichi , parted ways with his disciple Kawai Sora at Yamanaka Onsen. On his way back to Komatsu, where he had stayed a few days earlier, he visited Nata-dera and composed a haiku while gazing at the rocky cliffs of the Yusenkyō, with its strangely shaped rocks and sacred stones. There is a monument to Basho on the temple grounds.

== Gallery ==
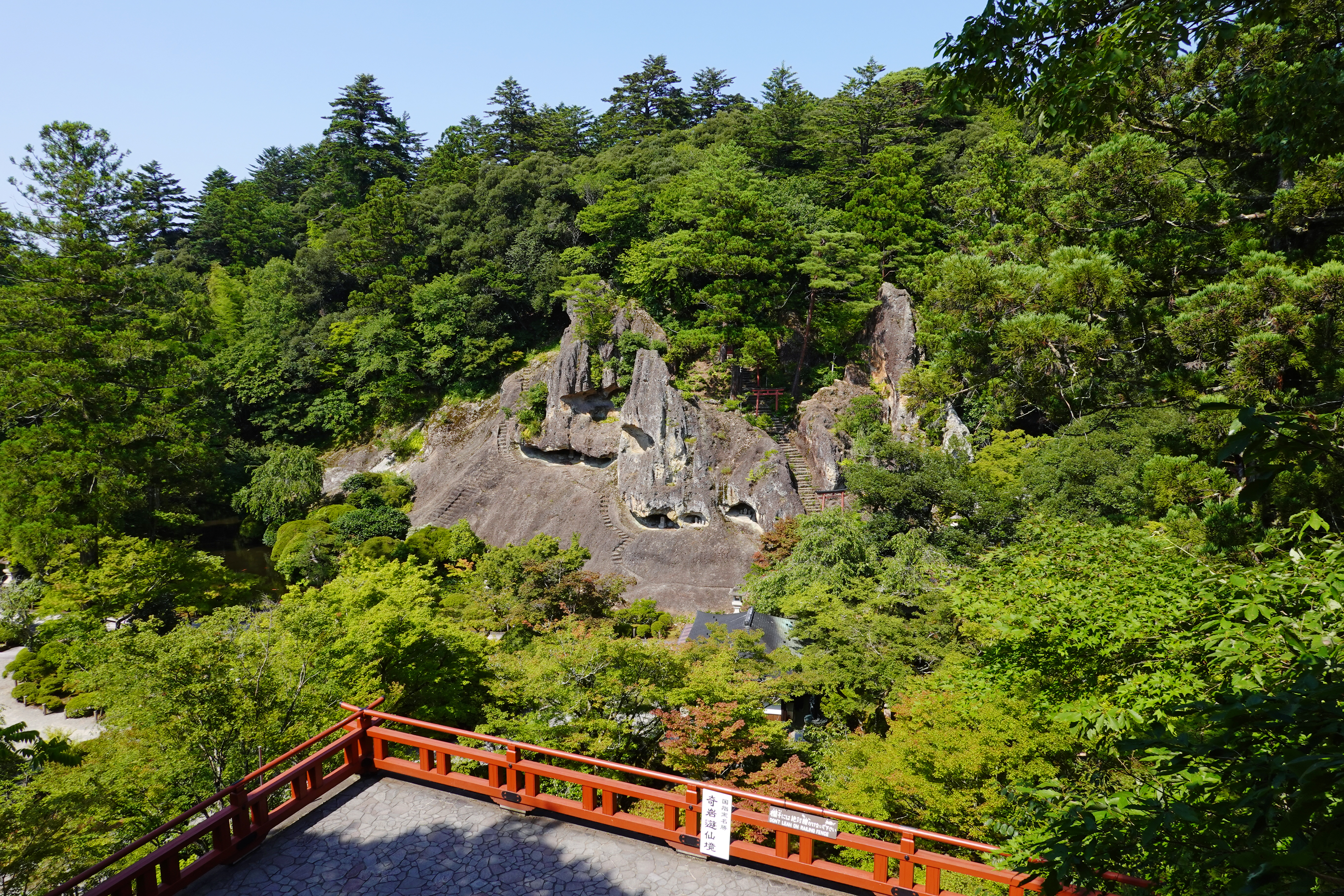
Yusenkyō

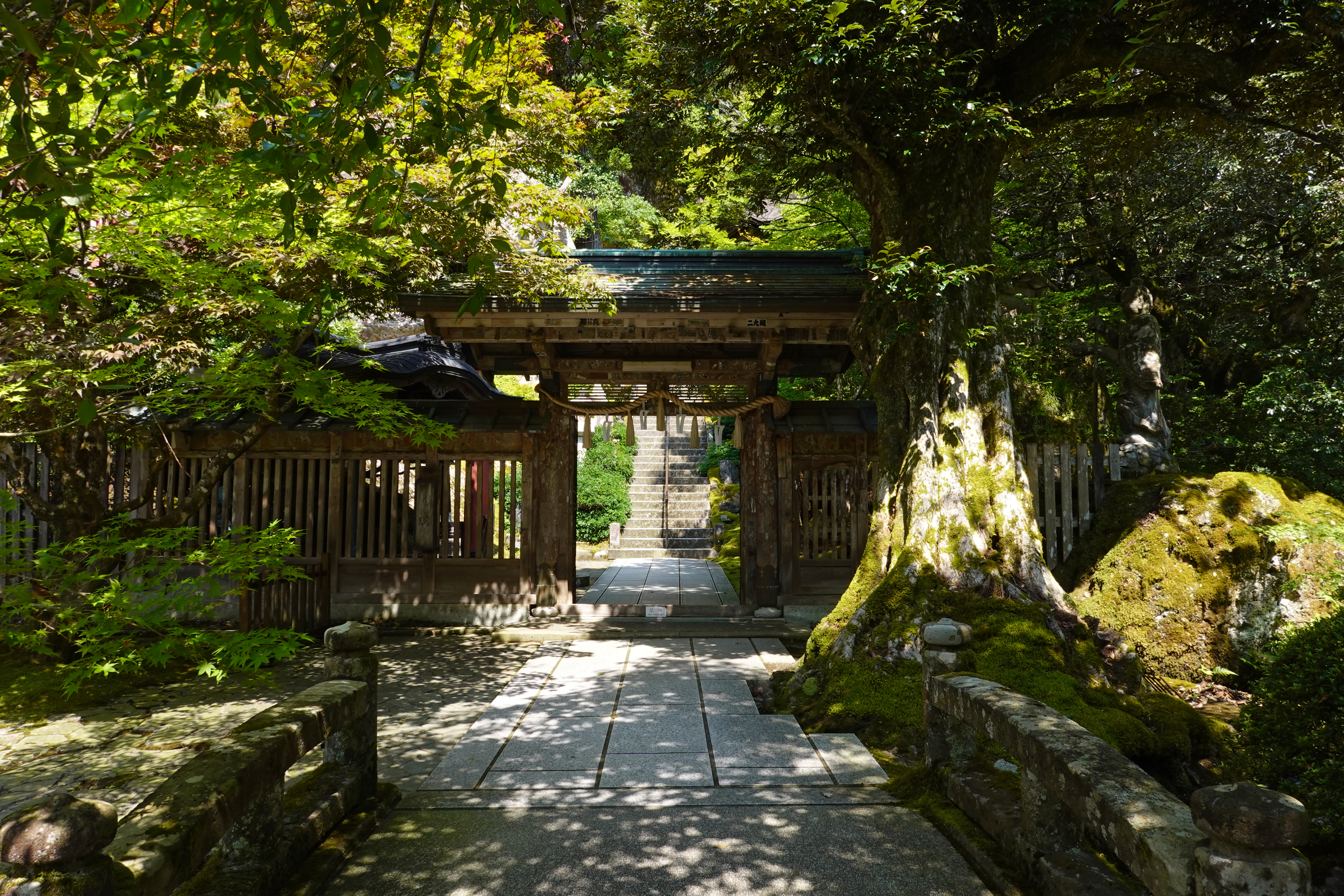
Karamon（ICP）

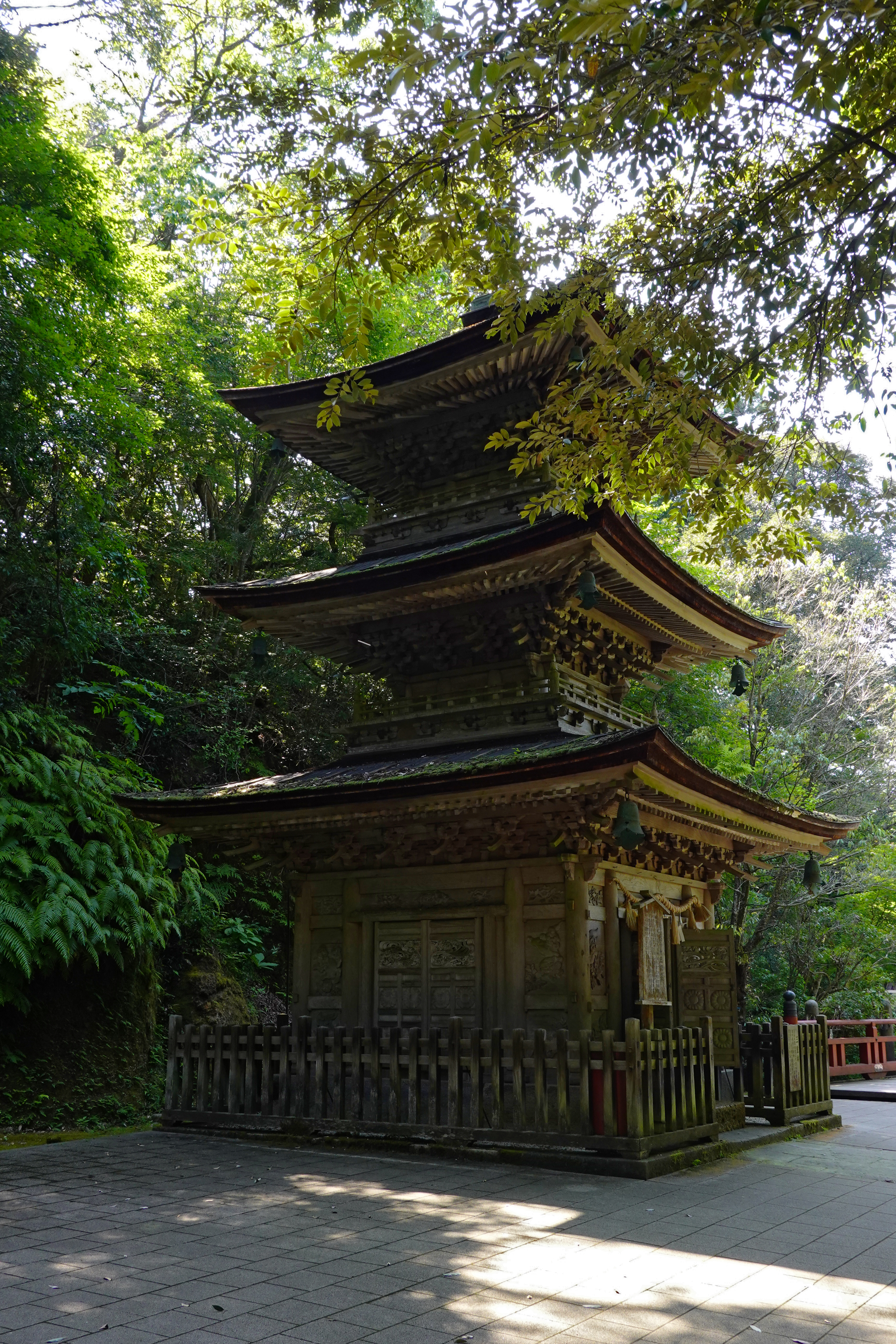
Three-story pagoda（ICP）

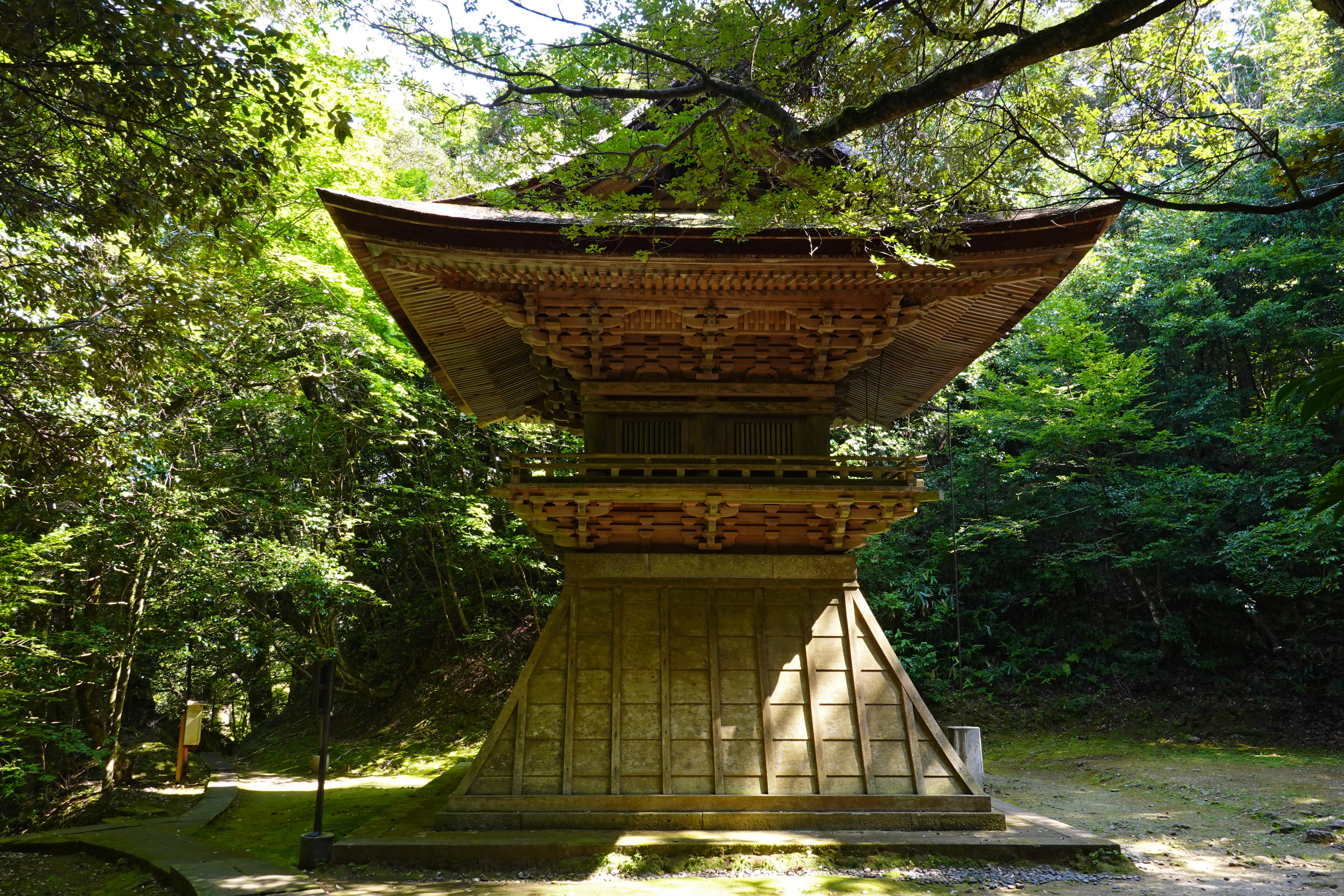
Shōrō（ICP）

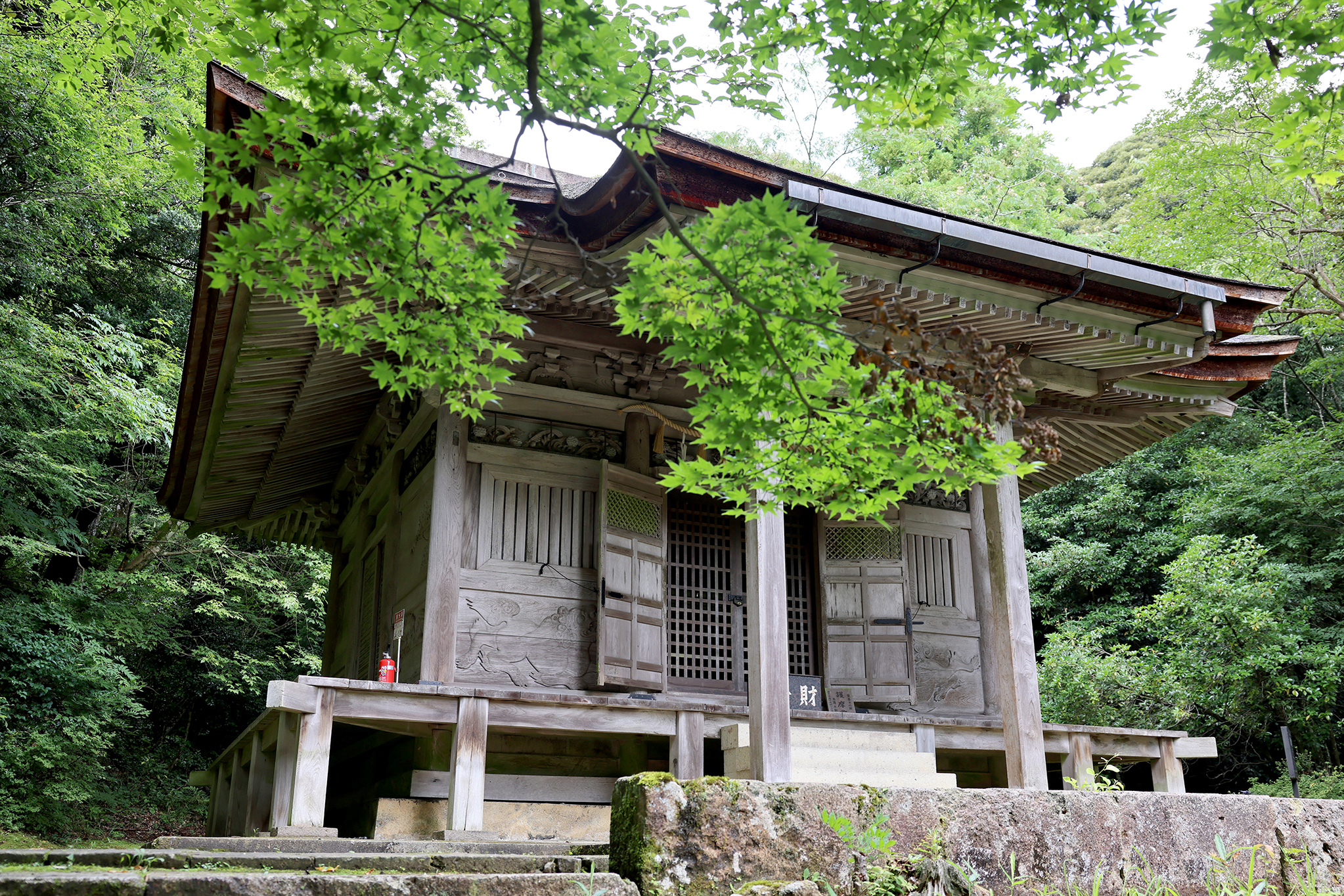
Goma-dō（ICP）

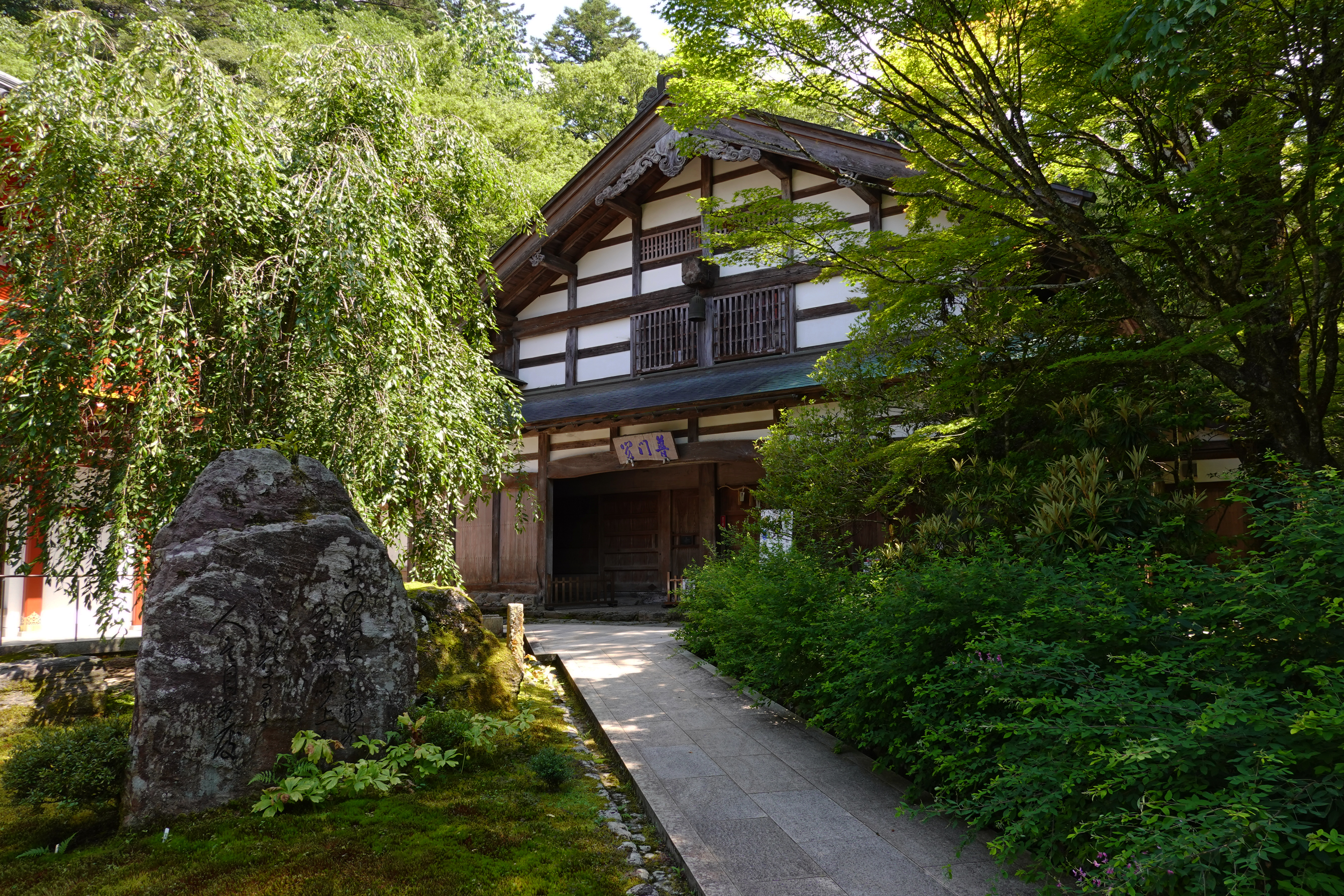
Fumon-kaku（RTCP）

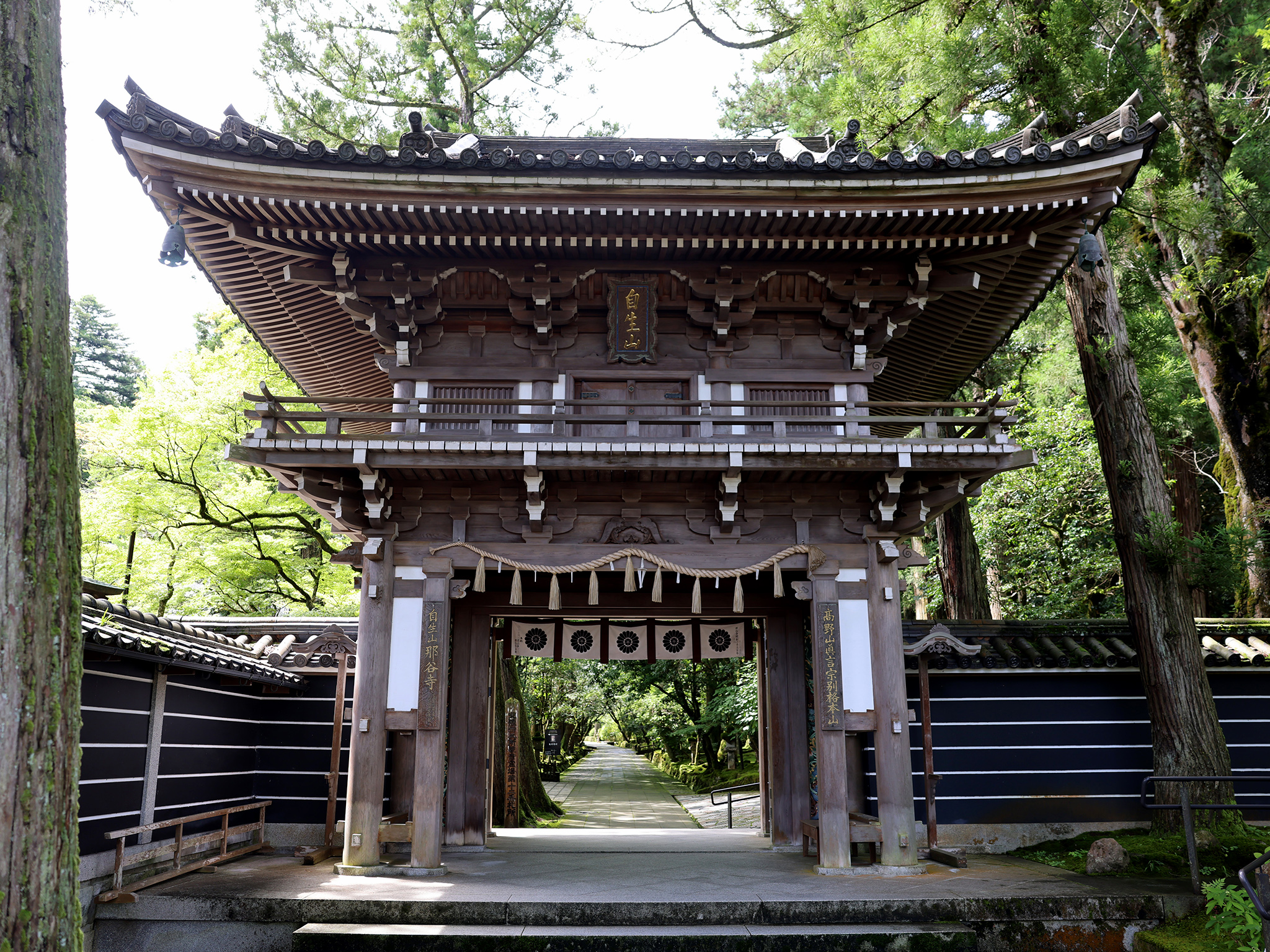
Sanmon

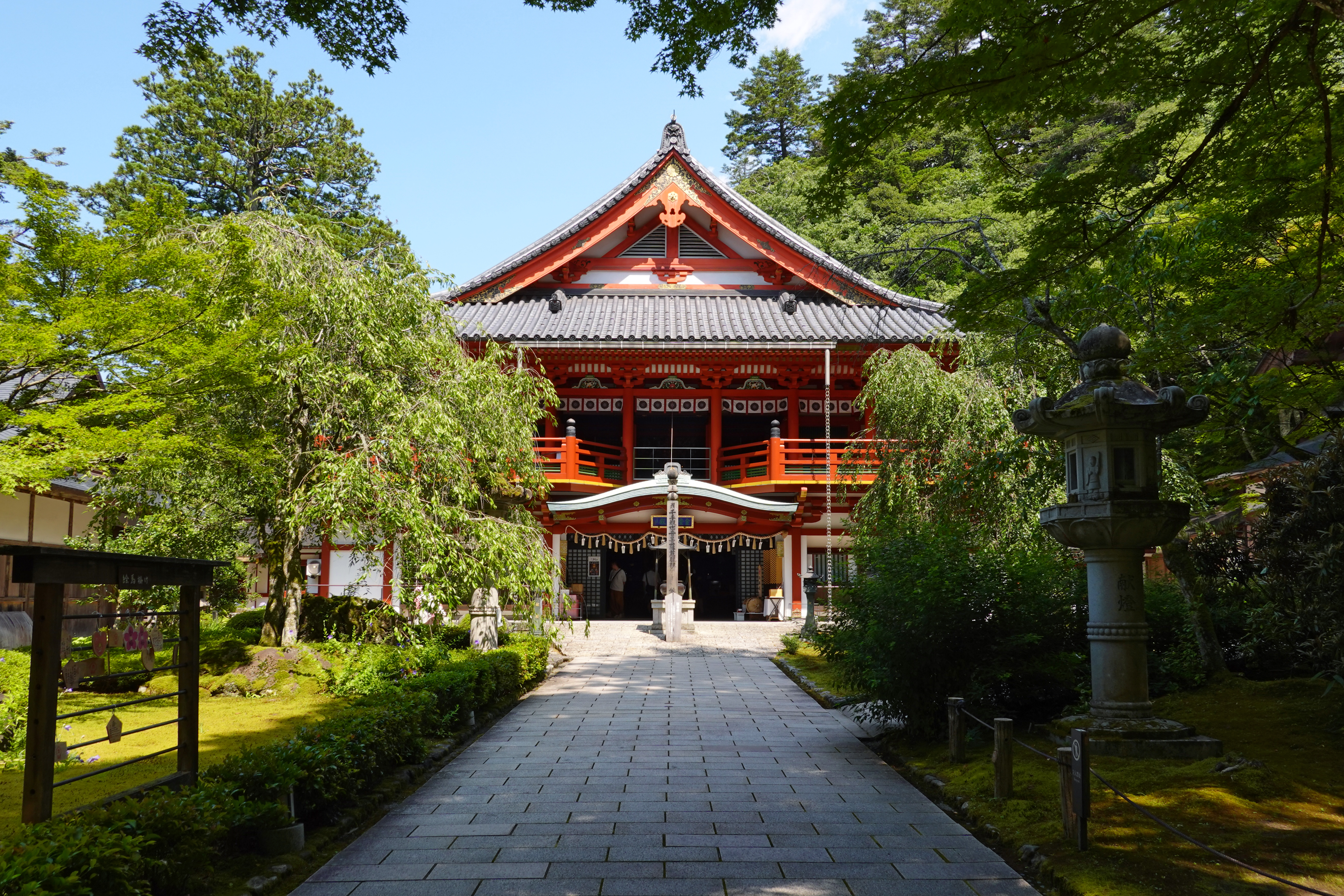
Kondō Keiō-den

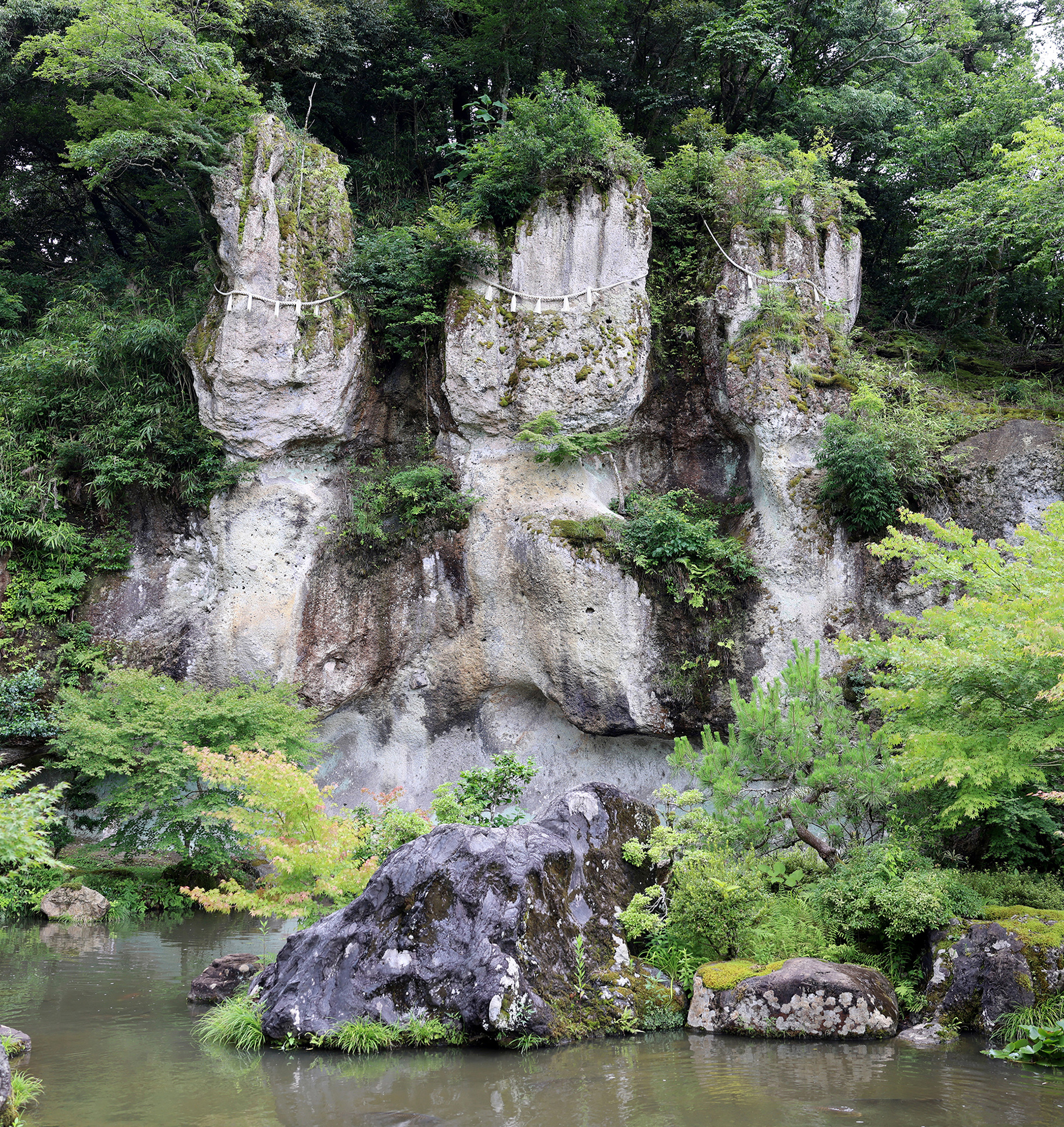
Sansonseki

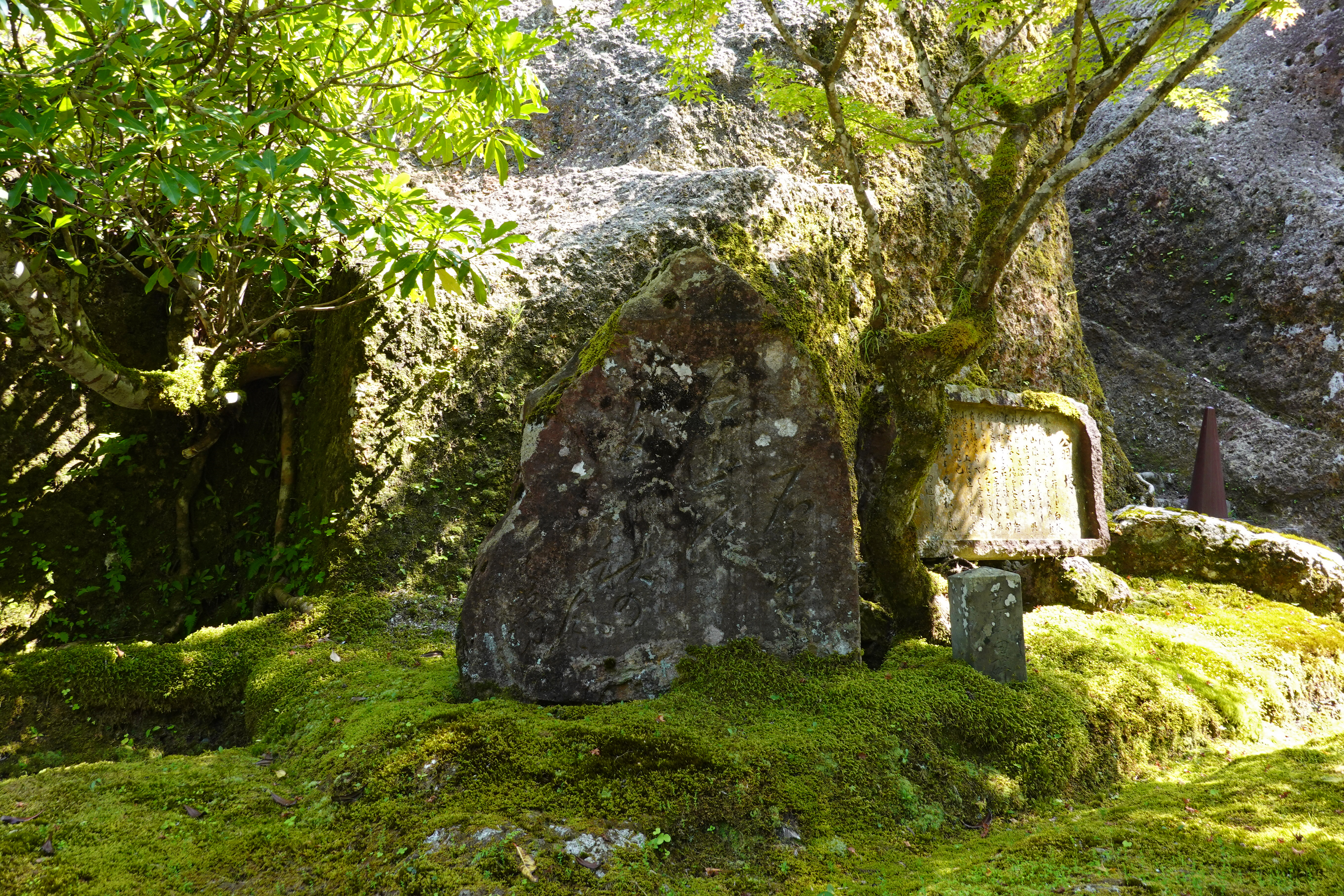
Basho monument

== Access ==
The temple is located approximately 15 minutes by car from Kagaonsen Station on the Hokuriku Shinkansen and IR Ishikawa Railway, and approximately 10 minutes from Iburihashi Station on the IR Ishikawa Railway.

== Cultural Properties ==
=== National Important Cultural Properties ===
- Hondō, Karamon, Haiden (本堂（本殿、唐門、拝殿）), Sengoku period (1597) Although it was devastated during the Ikkō-ikki uprising, it was rebuilt in 1642 under the patronage of Maeda Toshitsune. The main hall is called "Daihikaku," and it is built against a rock face without a roof, using Chinese wood construction, a portico, and a persimmon-bark awning. The transoms on all four sides are adorned with openwork carvings by Yamagami Zen'emon. 0. The three Important Cultural Property buildings, the Daihikaku worship hall, the Karamon gate, and the main hall, are collectively called the "Hondō". Inside is the "Iwaya Taikai Kuguri," where the principal image of the temple, the Eleven-Faced Thousand-Armed Kannon Bosatsu, is enshrined.
- Shoin and Kuri (院及び庫裏), Edo period (1649). The shoin was originally built as a temporary hall after the temple was destroyed by fire during the wars at the end of the Muromachi period. Maeda Toshitsune rebuilt it as a shoin in 1637, personally overseeing its construction. It consists of the Onari-no-ma (reception room), the Koto-no-ma (koto room), two rooms of 4 and 8 tatami mats, a 10-tatami mat Saya-no-ma (sleeve room), and a tokonoma. It is a single-story building with a hipped roof (originally covered with persimmon shingles).
- Three-story pagoda (三重塔). Edo period (1642). Builtby Maeda Toshitsune to celebrate the birth of Tokugawa Ietsuna. All three stories are constructed using the fan-shaped rafter technique, and the relief carvings of Chinese lions and peonies on the doors. Inside is a statue of Dainichi Nyorai said to have originally been he principal image of the main hall of Nata-dera, it was carried out of the fire by Hakusan sect followers when the building burned down during the wars of the Naboku-chō period.
- Goma-dō (護摩堂), Edo period (1649) While based on the Zen Buddhist style, blends Japanese architectural techniques. The interior is decorated with gold leaf, and the walls have carvings of eight types of Chinese lions, while the four sides feature sculptures of the animals of the Chinese zodiac and peonies. The inner sanctuary houses a Heian period statue of Fudo Myoo.
- Shōrō (鐘楼). Edo period (1649). It is a purely Japanese-style building with a hipped roof and cypress bark roofing, and its stone construction extending to the upper part of the base is considered unique in Japan. The bell hanging inside is said to have been brought from Korea.

=== National Registered Tangible Cultural Properties ===
- Fumon-kaku (普門閣), Edo period (1847) In 1965, the Haruki family residence from the former Shinbo village at the foot of Mount Hakusan was relocated to this location as the "Fumon-kaku." The Haruki family ancestor, Seizenbō, followed Shinran on his travels throughout the country, and upon their parting, received an image of the Kōmyō Honzon. He then opened a dōjō in Shinbō on Mt. Dainichi, which was later rebuilt by the master carpenter who worked on the reconstruction of Eihei-ji. The building took three years to complete, starting in 1847. It is a farmhouse style building made of zelkova wood, and inside there is a museum, a rest area, and a museum shop.

=== National Place of Scenic Beauty ===
- Nata-dera Kuri Gardens (那谷寺庫裡庭園) Edo period. The garden visible from the shoin was created under the guidance of Kobori Enshū, and commissioned by Wakebe Bokusai, the garden design magistrate of Kaga Domain. Walking stones are placed throughout the garden, with stones erected in various locations, and ancient chestnut trees and giant cedar trees are strategically positioned. It is regarded as the oldest garden in Ishikawa Prefecture.
- 'Landscape of Oku no Hosomichi - Nata-dera Precinct (おくのほそ道の風景地 那谷寺境内)

=== Ishikawa Prefecture Tangible Cultural Properties ===
- Wanli Five-Color Floral Dragon Pattern Vase (萬暦五彩草花龍文瓶), Ming dynasty (1563–1620). This item is a type of polychrome porcelain commonly known as "Wanli" porcelain, produced in the Jingdezhen kilns during the Wanli era (1573-1619) of Ming Dynasty China. It is a type of ceramic porcelain decorated with red, green, and yellow glazes. The shape is modeled after a type of ancient Chinese bronze vessel called a "zun" with a rounded body, slender neck, and flared base. The lower rim is adorned with banana leaf motifs, the neck with arabesque patterns, the body with swirling and thunder patterns, and the base with cloud patterns, each separated by a band of design. A dragon motif adorns the area between the rim and body, while floral and bird motifs (peony, peacock), and wave patterns are painted in blue and polychrome from the body to the base. The inscription "Made during the Wanli period of the Great Ming Dynasty" is also inscribed on the upper part of the rim.

== See also ==
- List of Places of Scenic Beauty of Japan (Ishikawa)
