= Yunokuni no mori =

Coordinates: 36°19′28″N 136°26′11″E

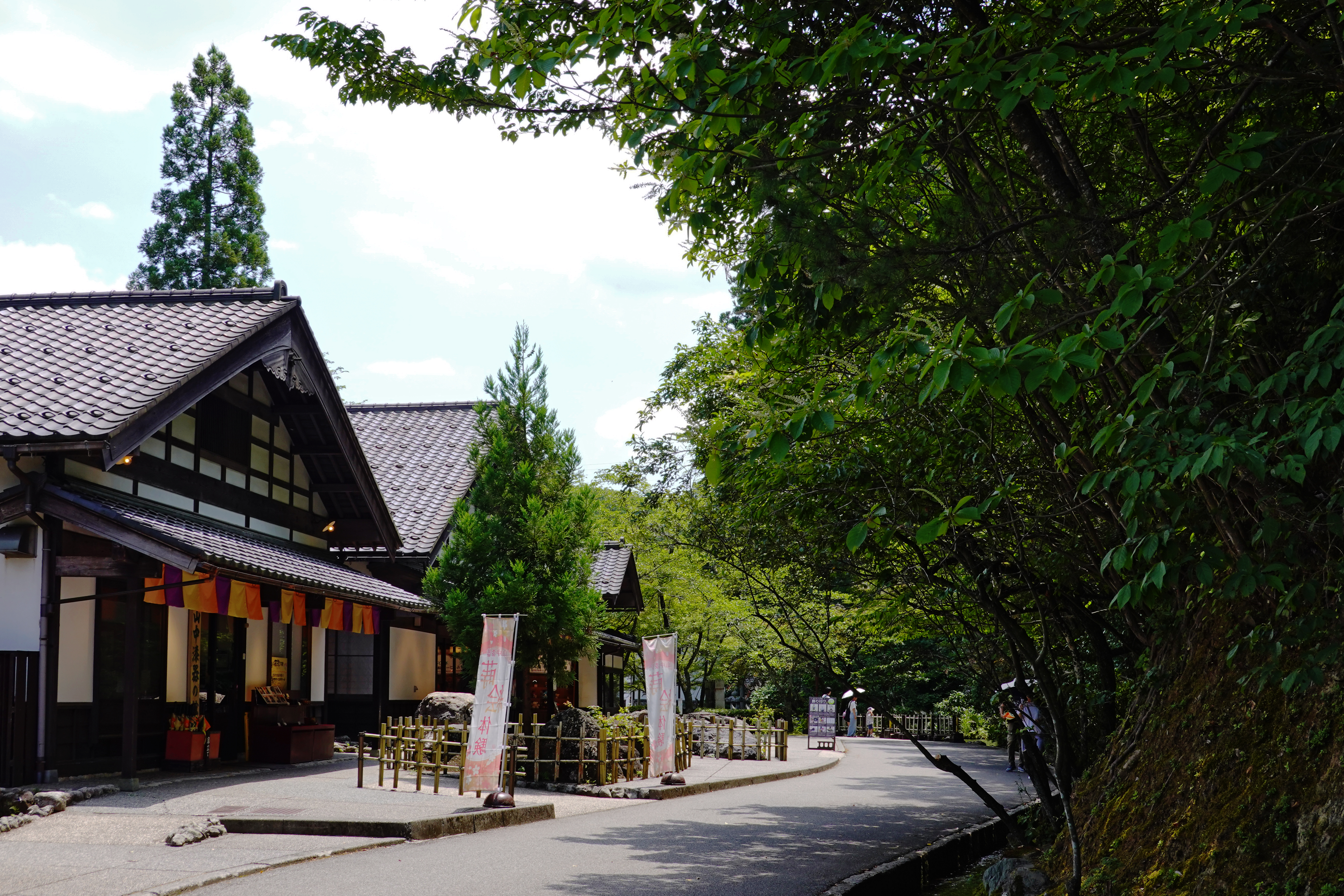
In front of Yamanaka Lacquer were House and Music Box House in Yunokuno no Mori

Yunokuni no Mori (ゆのくにの森) is a crafts village in Komatsu, a city located in the southern portion of Ishikawa Prefecture in Japan. It is located near Awazu Onsen amid over one hundred acres of natural forest, and contains a cluster of traditional Japanese houses, each containing a working display of traditional handicrafts native to the Hokuriku region of Japan.

These traditional handicrafts include: Wajima lacquerware, Kutani ceramics, gold leaf, Kaga yūzen (printed silk), washi paper, glass blowing and Yamanaka woodwork as well as traditional Japanese confectionaries and the Japanese tea ceremony. At Yunokuni no Mori one can participate in learning crafts, or purchase various Kaga area goods.
