= Komatsu College =

Coordinates: 36°21′16.7″N 136°25′1″E

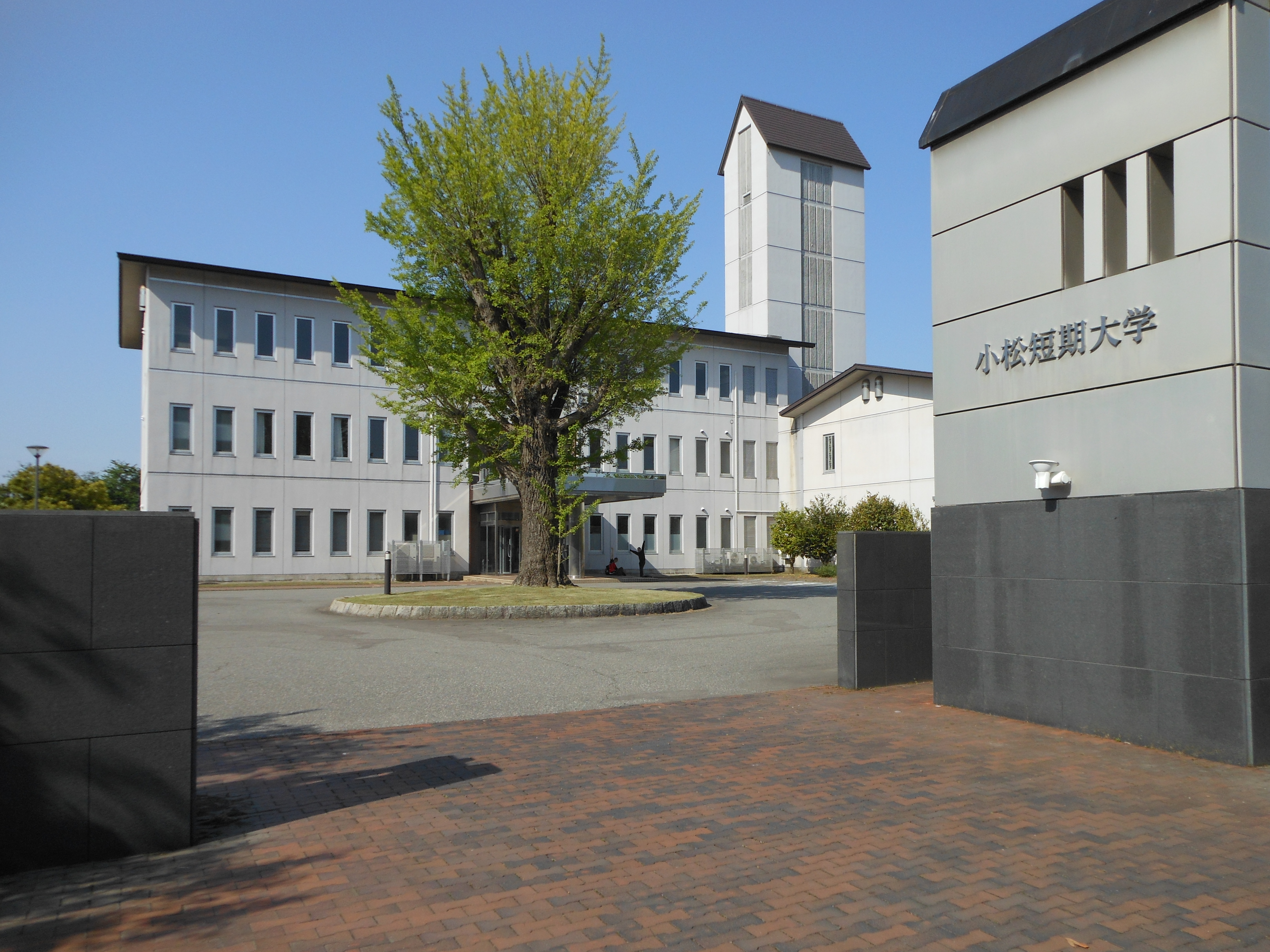
Komatsu College

Komatsu College (小松短期大学, Komatsu tanki daigaku) is a private junior college in Komatsu, Ishikawa, Japan, established in 1988.
