= Hōshi Ryokan =

Traditional inn in Ishikawa Prefecture, Japan

Coordinates: 36°19′54″N 136°26′53″E

Hōshi
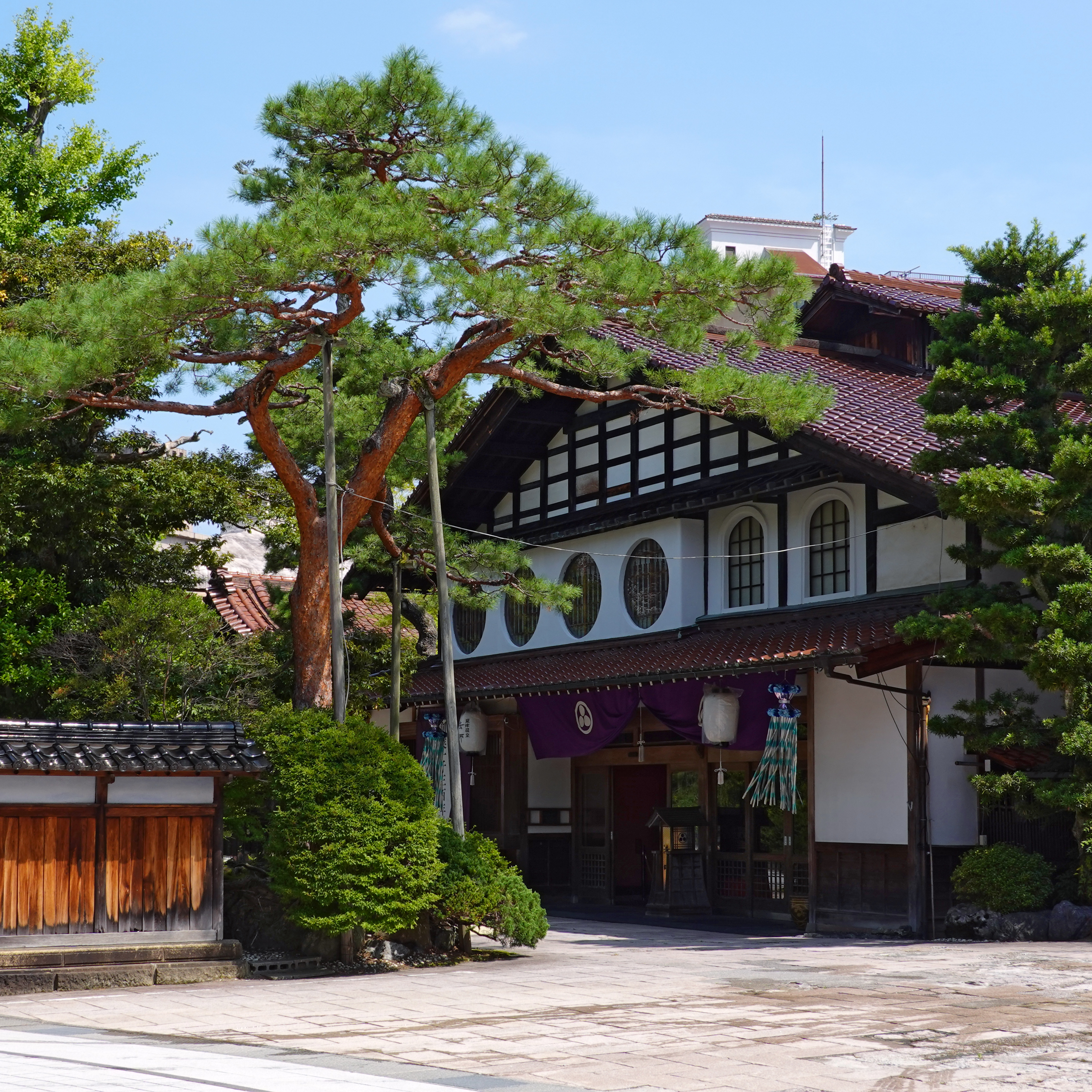
- Industry: Hotel
- Founded: 718; 1308 years ago
- Headquarters: Komatsu, Ishikawa, Japan
- Website: www.ho-shi.co.jp

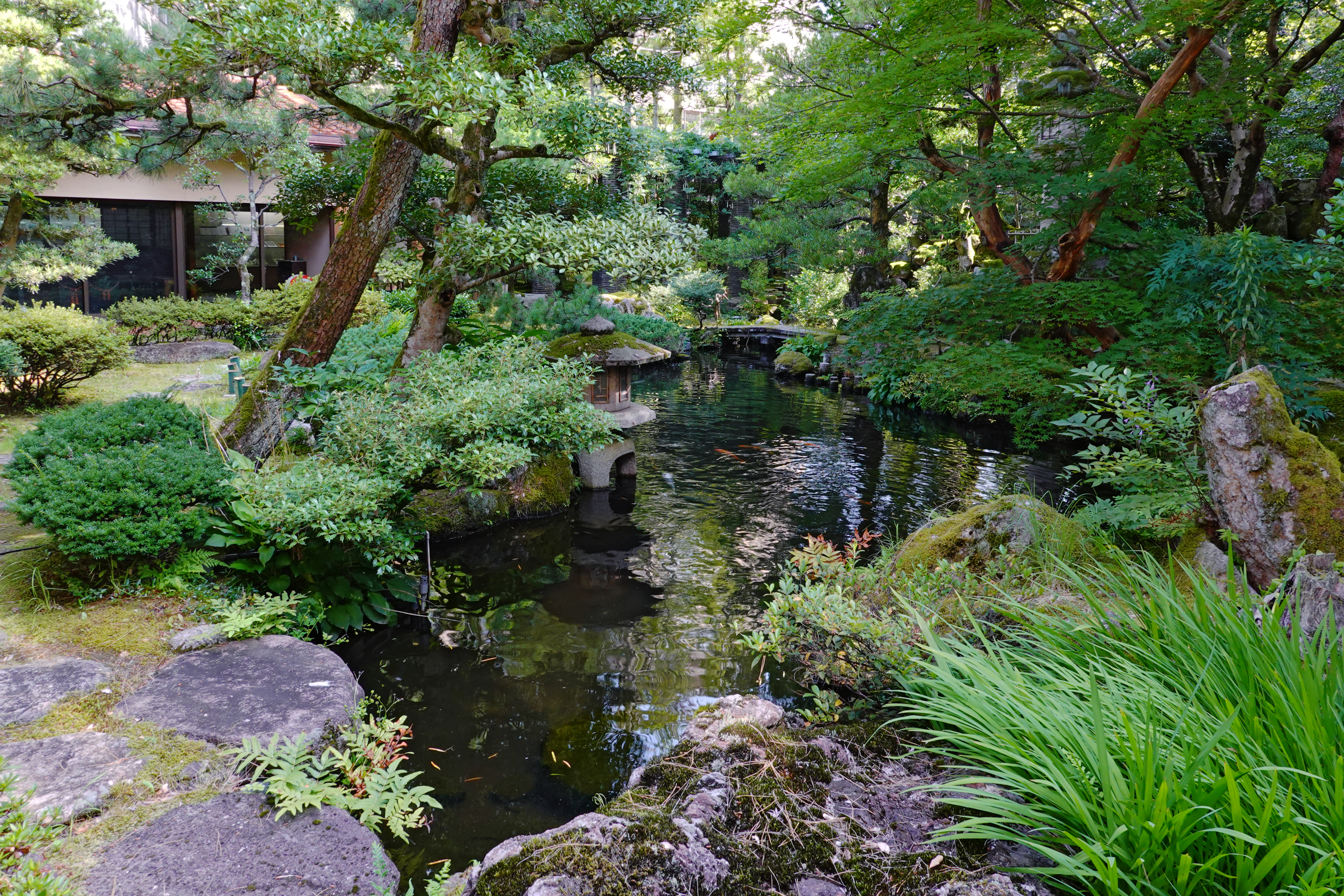
Main garden

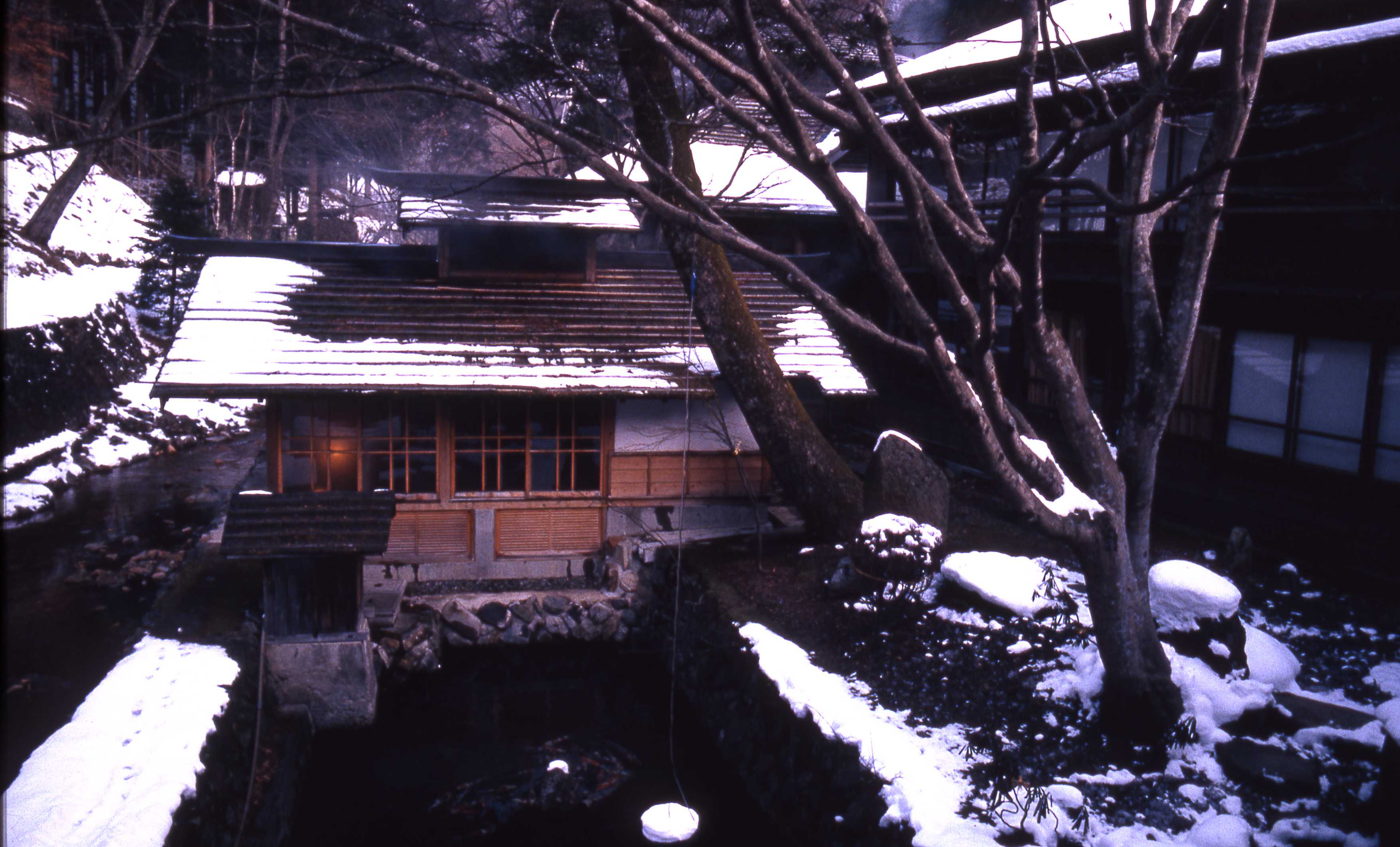
Hot springs spa bath at Hōshi Ryokan in winter

Hōshi (法師) is a ryokan (Japanese traditional inn) founded in 718 in Ishikawa Prefecture, Japan. Under the instruction of Taichō, who was the founder of the Mount Haku religious tradition; it was given the name "Hōshi". As of 2017, it has been owned and managed by the Hoshi family for forty-six generations and was thought to be the oldest operating hotel in the world until Nishiyama Onsen Keiunkan, founded in 705, claimed that title. It is located in Awazu Onsen, Komatsu, Ishikawa. However, it remains the record-holder of the world's oldest, continually-run family business.

== See also ==
- Three Ancient Springs
- List of oldest companies
