= Komatsu, Ishikawa =

Komatsu 小松市
- City
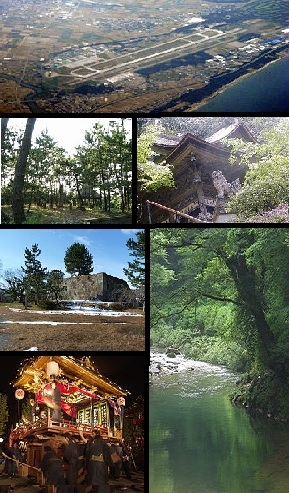
- Top: Komatsu Airport; Ataka Barrier, Nata-dera; Komatsu Castle, Dainichi River; Otabi Matsuri

- Flag Seal

- Location of Komatsu in Ishikawa Prefecture

- Coordinates: 36°24′30″N 136°26′43.9″E
- Country: Japan
- Region: Chūbu (Hokuriku)
- Prefecture: Ishikawa Prefecture

Government
  - - Mayor: Shinji Wada

Area
  - Total: 371.05 km^{2} (143.26 sq mi)

Population (March 1, 2018)
  - Total: 108,509
  - Density: 292.44/km^{2} (757.41/sq mi)
- Time zone: UTC+9 (Japan Standard Time)
- Phone number: 0761-20-0404
- Address: 91 Konmademachi, Komatsu-shi, Ishikawa-ken 923-8650
- Climate: Cfa
- Website: Official website
- Symbols
- Flower: Ume
- Tree: Pine

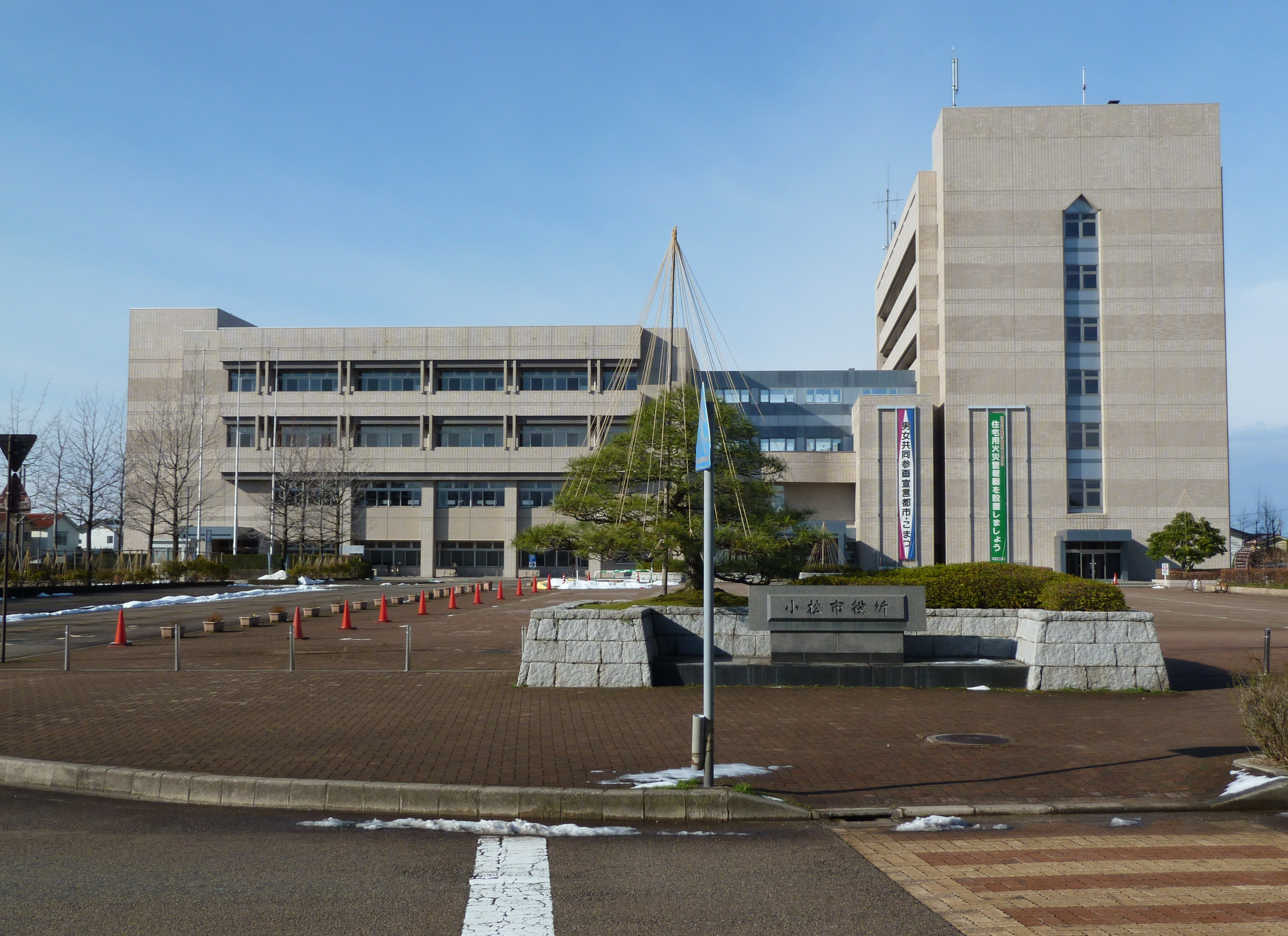
Komatsu City Hall

Komatsu (小松市, Komatsu-shi) is a city located in Ishikawa Prefecture, Japan. As of 1 March 2018, the city had an estimated population of 108,509 in 42,664 households, and a population density of 290 persons per km^{2}. The total area of the city was 371.05 square kilometres (143.26 sq mi).

== Geography ==
Komatsu is located in southwestern Ishikawa Prefecture in the Hokuriku region of Japan and is bordered by the Sea of Japan to the east and Fukui Prefecture to the south. It is located about an hour driving distance southwest from Kanazawa (the capital of Ishikawa Prefecture).

=== Neighbouring municipalities ===
- Fukui Prefecture
  - Katsuyama
- Ishikawa Prefecture
  - Hakusan
  - Kaga
  - Nomi

=== Climate ===
Komatsu has a humid subtropical climate (Köppen Cfa) characterized by mild summers and cold winters with heavy snowfall. The average annual temperature in Komatsu is 14.3 °C. The average annual rainfall is 2521 mm with September as the wettest month. The temperatures are highest on average in August, at around 26.8 °C, and lowest in January, at around 2.9 °C.

Climate data for Komatsu (1991−2020 normals, extremes 1978−present)
Month	Jan	Feb	Mar	Apr	May	Jun	Jul	Aug	Sep	Oct	Nov	Dec	Year
Record high °C (°F)	19.2 (66.6)	21.9 (71.4)	28.4 (83.1)	30.5 (86.9)	34.1 (93.4)	36.2 (97.2)	37.3 (99.1)	40.0 (104.0)	37.8 (100.0)	33.4 (92.1)	27.8 (82.0)	24.5 (76.1)	40.0 (104.0)
Mean daily maximum °C (°F)	7.2 (45.0)	7.9 (46.2)	11.7 (53.1)	17.3 (63.1)	22.3 (72.1)	25.4 (77.7)	29.5 (85.1)	31.3 (88.3)	27.1 (80.8)	21.6 (70.9)	16.0 (60.8)	10.3 (50.5)	19.0 (66.1)
Daily mean °C (°F)	3.6 (38.5)	3.9 (39.0)	6.9 (44.4)	12.2 (54.0)	17.3 (63.1)	21.2 (70.2)	25.4 (77.7)	26.7 (80.1)	22.5 (72.5)	16.8 (62.2)	11.2 (52.2)	6.2 (43.2)	14.5 (58.1)
Mean daily minimum °C (°F)	0.4 (32.7)	0.2 (32.4)	2.3 (36.1)	7.0 (44.6)	12.4 (54.3)	17.5 (63.5)	22.0 (71.6)	23.0 (73.4)	18.7 (65.7)	12.4 (54.3)	6.8 (44.2)	2.6 (36.7)	10.4 (50.8)
Record low °C (°F)	−9.8 (14.4)	−8.8 (16.2)	−5.1 (22.8)	−1.4 (29.5)	3.4 (38.1)	9.6 (49.3)	15.1 (59.2)	15.0 (59.0)	8.9 (48.0)	2.3 (36.1)	−0.4 (31.3)	−5.7 (21.7)	−9.8 (14.4)
Average precipitation mm (inches)	251.3 (9.89)	147.7 (5.81)	144.3 (5.68)	129.3 (5.09)	127.3 (5.01)	151.0 (5.94)	218.9 (8.62)	152.0 (5.98)	214.6 (8.45)	171.6 (6.76)	219.4 (8.64)	282.5 (11.12)	2,230.2 (87.80)
Average precipitation days (≥ 1.0 mm)	23.8	18.8	15.6	12.2	11.1	10.6	12.8	9.6	12.7	12.8	17.4	22.8	180.2
Mean monthly sunshine hours	62.7	87.7	146.3	187.5	206.5	155.4	166.3	217.0	157.8	152.6	112.2	68.0	1,723.2
Source: Japan Meteorological Agency

== Demographics ==
Per Japanese census data, the population of Komatsu peaked around the year 2000 and has declined slightly since.

Historical population
Year	Pop.	±%
1970	95,684	—
1980	104,329	+9.0%
1990	106,075	+1.7%
2000	108,662	+2.4%
2010	108,433	−0.2%
2020	106,216	−2.0%

== History ==
The area around Komatsu was part of ancient Kaga Province. The area became part Kaga Domain under the Edo period Tokugawa shogunate. Komatsu housed the retirement castle of Maeda Toshitsune. While nearly all of the castle was demolished, its garden still remains as Rojou Park (芦城公園). In the spring, this is one of the prefecture's best spots for cherry blossom viewing. Following the Meiji restoration, the area was organised into Nomi District, Ishikawa. The town of Komatsu was established with the creation of the modern municipalities system on April 1, 1889. Komatsu merged with surrounding municipalities to become a city on December 1, 1940.

== Government ==
Komatsu has a mayor-council form of government with a directly elected mayor and a unicameral city legislature of 22 members.

== Economy ==
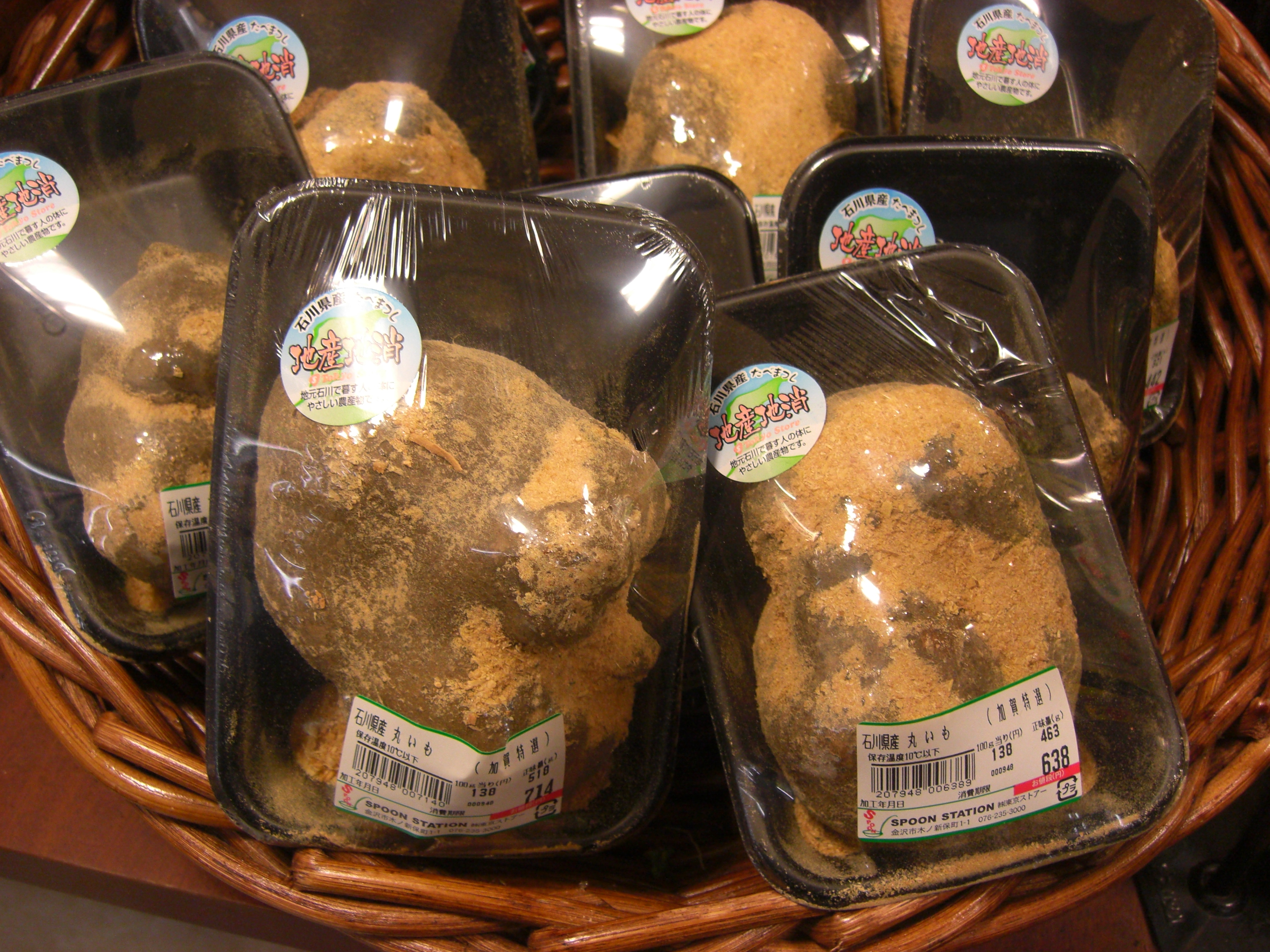
Kaga-maruimo, a famed local cultivar of the Chinese yam

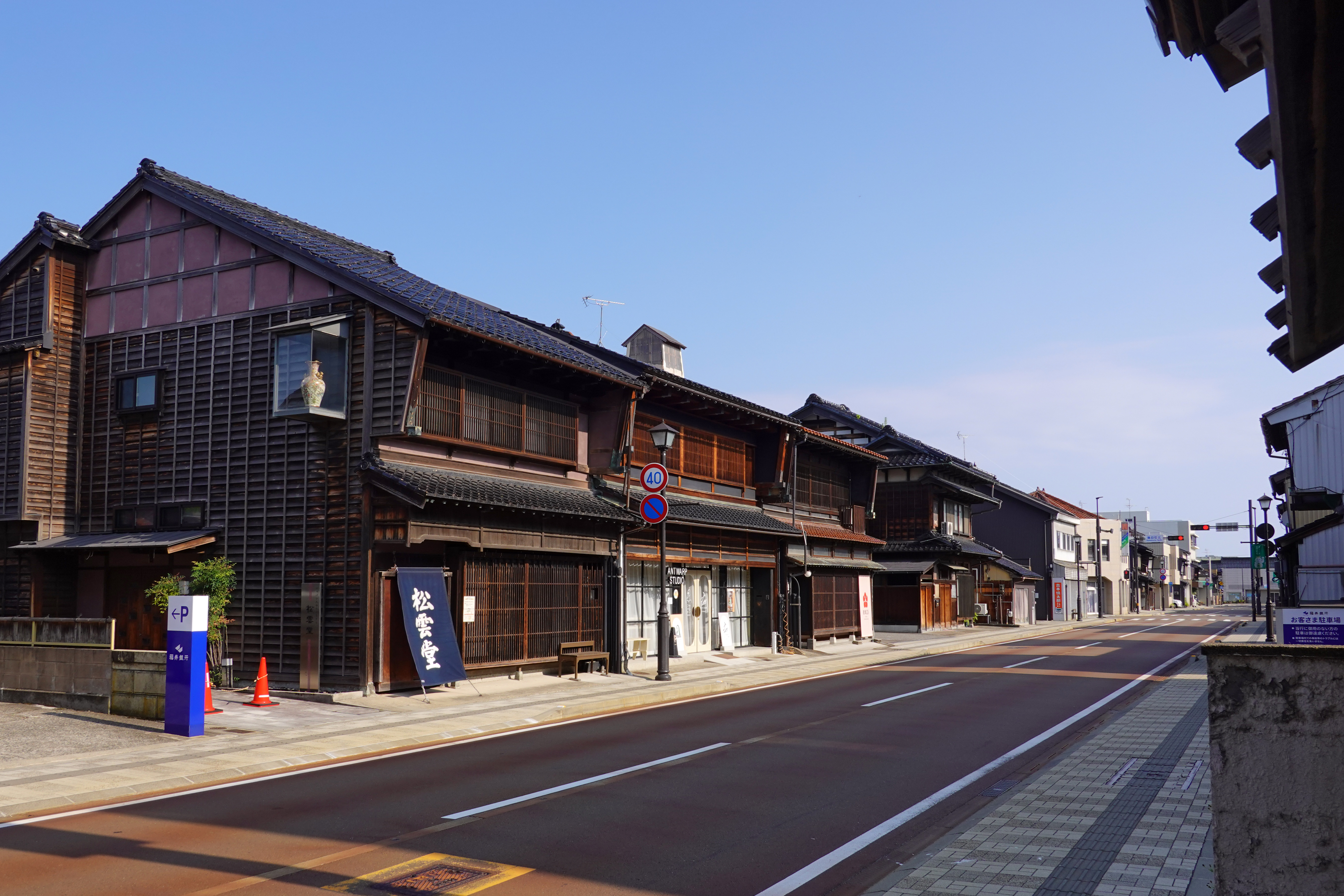
Old town

Komatsu was traditionally known for the production of Kutani ware ceramics and for silk. Komatsu Limited, the Japanese multinational construction and mining equipment corporation, was founded in Komatsu in 1921.

== Education ==
Komatsu has 26 public elementary schools and ten middle schools operated by the city government, and five public high schools operated by the Ishikawa Prefectural Board of Education and one by the city government. There is also one private high school. Komatsu College, a private junior college is also located in Komatsu.

== Transportation ==
=== Railway ===
The Hokuriku Shinkansen took over as the primary railway service in Komatsu on 16 March 2024. The existing conventional line was transferred to the IR Ishikawa Railway effective the same date.

IR Ishikawa Railway

- Awazu - Komatsu - Meihō

West Japan Railway Company - Hokuriku Shinkansen

- Komatsu

=== Highway ===
- Hokuriku Expressway

National Route 8
National Route 305
National Route 360
National Route 416

=== Airport ===
- Komatsu Airport

== Sister cities ==
- Angarsk, Irkutsk Oblast, Russia, friendship city, since November 13, 2017
- Changhua, Taiwan, friendship city, since October 10, 2017
- Changnyeong County, South Gyeongsang, South Korea, friendship city
- (United Kingdom) Gateshead, Tyne and Wear, UK, since August 2, 1991
- Guilin, Guangxi, China, friendship city
- Jining, Shandong, China, since September 5, 2008
- Suzano, São Paulo, Brazil, since July 11, 1972
- Vilvoorde, Flemish Brabant, Belgium, since May 15, 1974

== Local attractions ==
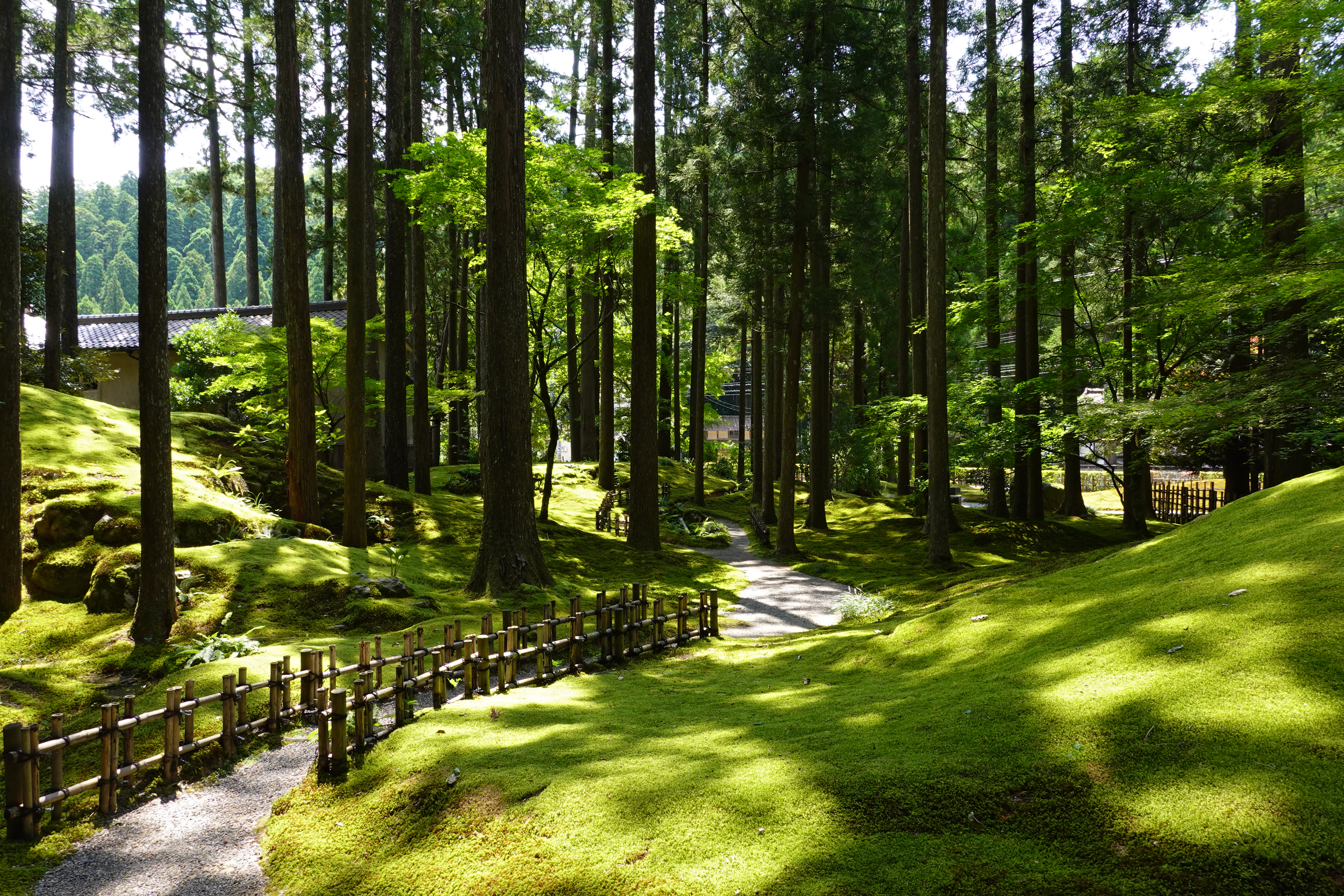
Forest of Wisdom

- Awazu Onsen, a hot spring resort
- Hoshi Ryokan (claimed to be world's second oldest hotel)
- Site of the Komatsu Castle (小松城)
- Motorcar Museum of Japan, the largest museum dedicated to motor vehicles in Japan with a 12,000 square metre display area
- Nata-dera Buddhist temple complex
- Yunokuni-no-mori traditional handicrafts village
- Forest of Wisdom
