= Awazu Onsen =

Hot springs resort town in Ishikawa Prefecture, Japan

Awazu Onsen 粟津温泉
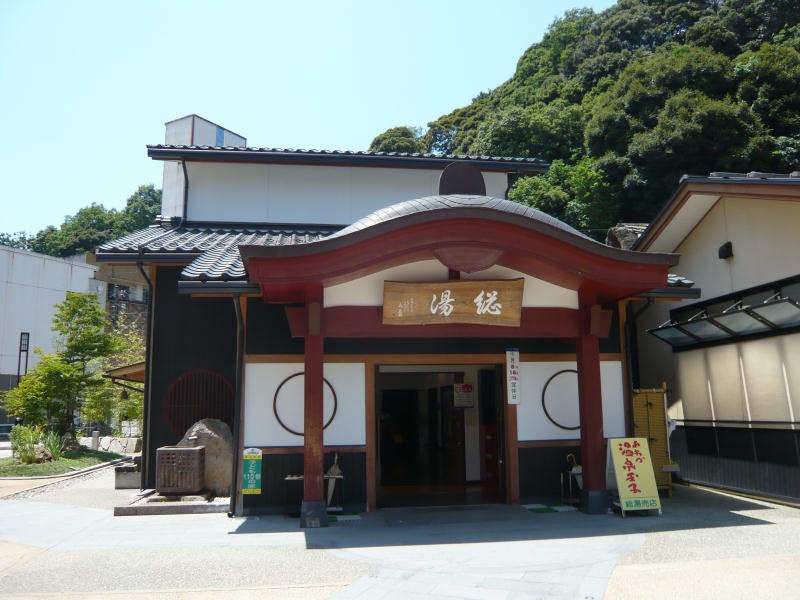
- Public baths at Awazu Onsen

- Location within Japan
- Interactive map of Awazu Onsen 粟津温泉
- Location: Komatsu, Ishikawa, Japan
- Coordinates: 36°19′50″N 136°26′24″E
- Elevation: 0 m (0 ft)
- Type: sulfuric

Awazu Onsen (粟津温泉, Awazu onsen) is a hot spring resort located in the city of Komatsu, Ishikawa Prefecture, Japan.

Awazu Onsen claims to have been founded by the shugendō monk Taichō in the Nara period under the command of the mountain deity Hakusan Daigongen. Taichō was a native of neighbouring Echizen Province and is said to have been the first person to have claimed Mount Hakusan, from which the hot springs at Awazu Onsen have their source. Although it is a small resort with few more than ten ryokan, each inn has its own well, rather than using a common source.

The Hōshi Ryokan within the area, founded in 718 AD was for some time recognized by the Guinness Book of World Records as the world's oldest hot spring inn, but the title has since been taken by Nishiyama Onsen Keiunkan, founded in 705.

== See also ==
- Hōshi Ryokan
