= Mawaki Site =

Japanese archaeological site

- 真脇遺跡 (Japanese)
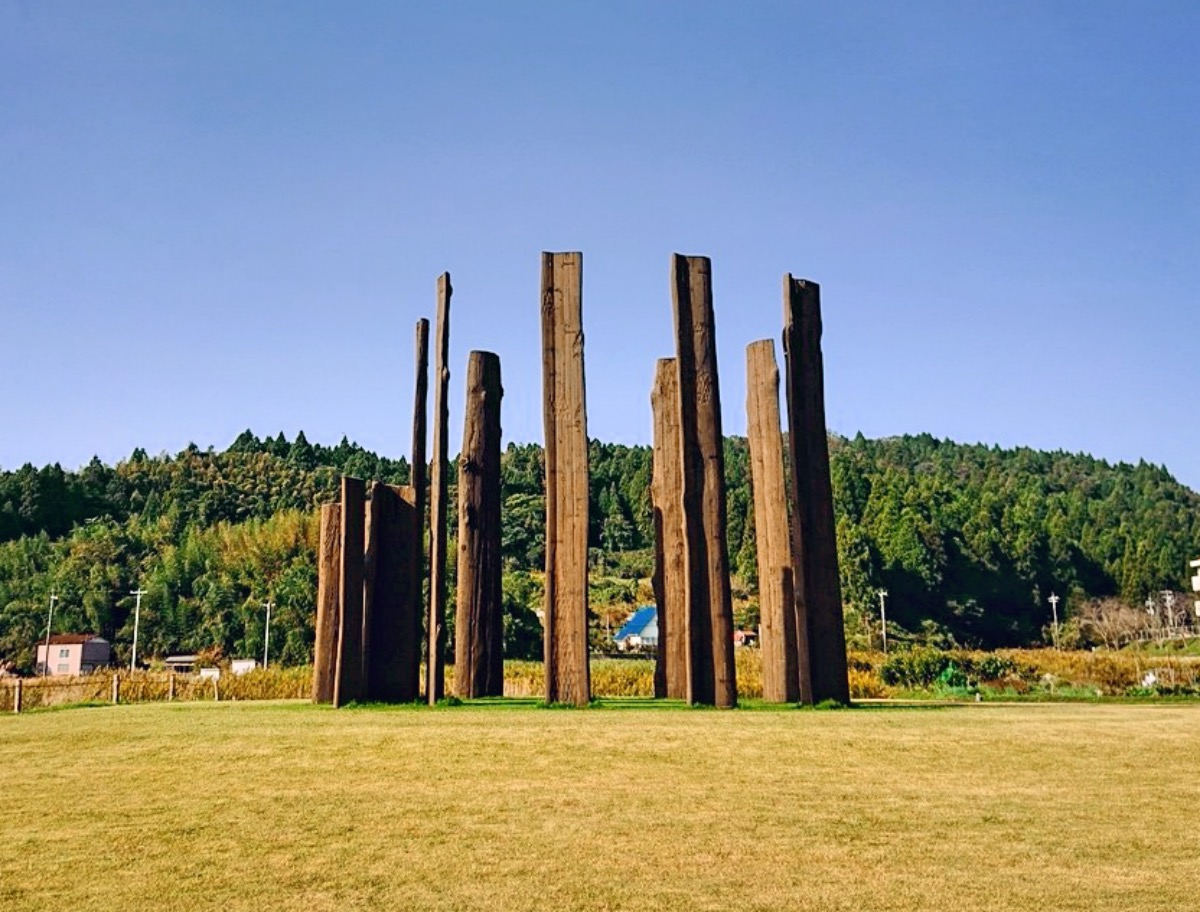
- Mawaki Site Wooden Circle

- Mawaki Site Mawaki Site (Japan)
- 37°18′20″N 137°12′27″E
- Type: settlement
- Periods: Jōmon period
- Location: Noto, Ishikawa, Japan
- Region: Hokuriku region

Site notes
- Area: 38,000 m^{2} (410,000 sq ft)
- Public access: Yes (park and museum)
- Website: www.mawakiiseki.jp

The Mawaki Site (真脇遺跡, Mawaki iseki) is an archaeological site with the ruins of a Jōmon period settlement in the Mawaki neighborhood of the city of Noto, Ishikawa in the Hokuriku region of Japan. The site was designated a National Historic Site of Japan in 1989.

== Overview ==
The Mawaki Site is located at the back of a small cove on the Noto Peninsula surrounded by hills on three sides, overlooking Toyama Bay. It is one of the largest Jōmon archaeological sites in the Hokuriku region and contains the site of a settlement which was continuously occupied over a 4000-year period from the beginning to the end of the Jōmon period. In an archaeological excavation conducted over a four-year period from 1987 an enormous number of artifacts were discovered, and the site was found to have clearly defined stratigraphic layers facilitating dating. The relics included an abundance of animal bones (especially dolphins), plant remains, as well as engraved pillars, rope, knitted materials, masks, the foundation posts for large raised-floor buildings, and pit dwellings. The site also contained an unparalleled range of pottery from every portion of the Jōmon period, and also all the Jōmon pottery forms known to have existed in the Hokuriku region, as well as many examples from other regions in Japan, making the site of critical importance into Jōmon pottery research.

In 1991, 219 items of earthenware, stone tools, bone tools, clay figurines, rock figurines, stone sticks, and other ritual items, wooden plates, and paddles were designated Important Cultural Properties. The "Mawaki-style pottery" believed to have been made at this location, has been found in Akita Prefecture and also in sites in the Kantō region.

In addition, the site has a number of unique features which have not been found in other archaeological sites. These include the "Ita-shiki clay pot grave" where the body was buried after laying a board in the grave, and the "Paste floor dwelling site" where the furnace was rebuilt six times in the exact same place. In addition, site has a ring of chestnut wooden columns forming a timber circle, such as has been found at the Chikamori Site in Kanazawa.

The site is now an archaeological park with the Mawaki Archaeology Museum (真脇遺跡縄文館, Mawaki iseki Jōmonkan) displaying some of the findings.

== In popular culture ==
The site was featured in Insomniacs After School, a manga of Makoto Ojiro, and its adaptations.

== See also ==
- List of Historic Sites of Japan (Ishikawa)
