= Kamo Site (Ishikawa) =

Archaeological site in Tsubata, Hokuriku, Japan

- 加茂遺跡 (Japanese)
- Kamo Site Kamo Site (Ishikawa) (Japan)
- 36°41′15″N 136°42′47″E
- Type: settlement
- Periods: Nara to Heian period
- Location: Tsubata, Ishikawa, Japan
- Region: Hokuriku region

Site notes
- Area: 46,804.96 m^{2} (503,804.4 sq ft)
- Public access: Yes (no facilities)

The Kamo Site (加茂遺跡, Kamo iseki) is an archaeological site in what is now the Agata neighborhood of the town of Tsubata, Ishikawa in the Hokuriku region of Japan. The site was designated a National Historic Site of Japan in 2015.

== Overview ==
The Kamo Site is a complex site where numerous relics from the Jōmon period through the Muromachi period have been discovered. It is located on a hillside in the northern part of Tsubata, between the Kahokugata Lagoon and the Hodatsu Mountains, near the border between the provinces of Kaga, Noto and Etchū. The site was initially discovered during construction work on the banks of the Funabashi River in 1953. However, it was not until the year 2000 during construction work on a bypass for Japan National Route 8 that the importance of the site was realized. During the Nara period and then Heian period, the route of the Hokuriku Kaidō leading to Noto Province and two north-to-south canals passed through this site, which was a node for both land and water traffic. In the southern portion of the site were warehouses and merchant buildings, whereas temple ruins along with pottery marked "Kamo-ji" have been found in the northern area. From these remains, it is presumed that this was the site of a local government office which managed the highway and traffic during the Nara and Heian periods. No specific example of such a local government complex have been found elsewhere in Japan, although the existence of such administrative structures appears in written materials

Numerous artifacts, including roof tiles, wooden tags, metal bands and fragments of writings were discovered. Of especial note was a wooden signboard for the posting of tolls and official notices, on which the name "Kaga District" appears. This signboard is dated to the Kashō era, which spanned June 848 through April 851. The board measures 23.7 cm in length, 61.3 cm in width, 1.7 cm in thickness and is currently permanently on display at the Ishikawa Prefectural History Museum. It is an Important Cultural Property.

== See also ==
- List of Historic Sites of Japan (Ishikawa)
