= Yoshizaki-Suba Site =

- 吉崎・次場遺跡 (Japanese)
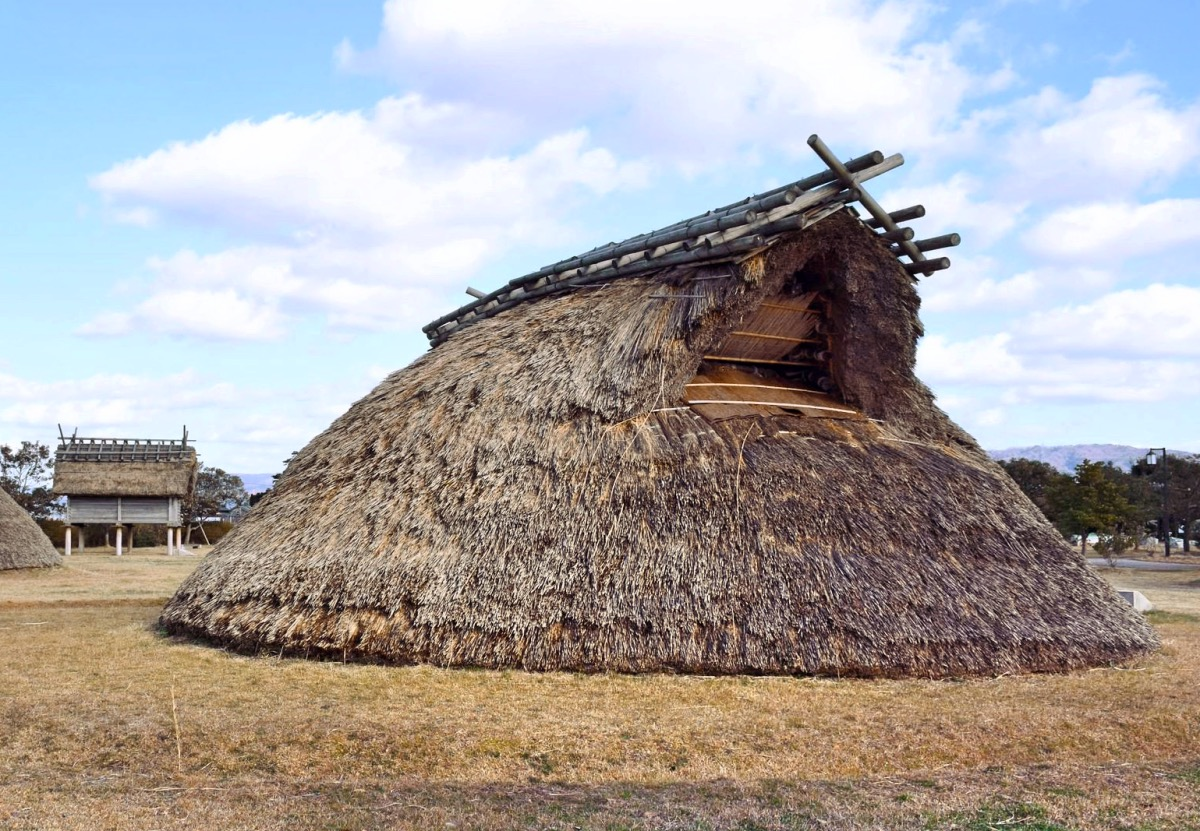
- Reconstructed pit dwellings at Yoshizaki-Suba site

- Yoshizaki-Suba Site Yoshizaki-Suba Site (Japan)
- 36°54′20″N 136°47′24″E
- Type: settlement
- Periods: Yayoi period
- Location: Hakui, Ishikawa, Japan
- Region: Hokuriku region

Site notes
- Area: 10,059.72 m^{2} (108,281.9 sq ft)
- Public access: Yes (Park)

The Yoshizaki-Suba Site (吉崎・次場遺跡, Yoshizaki-Suba iseki) is an archaeological site and the ruins of a Yayoi period settlement in what is now the Yoshizaki neighborhood of the city of Hakui, Ishikawa in the Hokuriku region of Japan. The site was designated a National Historic Site of Japan in 1983.

== Overview ==
The Yoshizaki-Suba Site is located at the base of the Noto Peninsula on a river terrace on the left bank of the Hakui River, about one kilometer northeast of the centre of the present city of Hakui. It is the largest known Yayoi settlement ruin in the Hokuriku region, covering an area of 580 meters from east-to-west by 350 meters from north-to-south. The remains have been dated to the middle and late Yayoi period, indicating a continuous inhabitation for over 2000 years. Archaeological excavations indicate that the village survived in some form into the Heian period. Yayoi pottery found at this site could be classified into several distinct styles depending on their strata, thus making this an invaluable type site for assembling the chronology of the Yayoi period in the Hokuriku region.

The foundations of raised-floor buildings, granaries, small and large tombs, wells and other structures have been discovered, but there is no indication of fortifications. In addition to the large amount of pottery was discovered, artifacts such as wooden agricultural implements, parts of boats and oars, weaving tools, building materials and two small bronze mirrors have been found. The agricultural implements show that paddy fields were cultivated in the area, and the mold for the bronze mirrors was also recovered, indicating that bronze smelting was also done within the settlement. The pottery shows influences of the comb-pattern decoration common to the Kansai region as well as pottery from the Tōhoku and San'in regions, indicating widespread trade and cultural exchange during the Yayoi period.

The site is now an archaeological park with several restored structures to form a tourist attraction. The site is about a 20-minute walk from Hakui Station on the JR West Nanao Line.

== See also ==
- List of Historic Sites of Japan (Ishikawa)
