= Mount Sekidō =

Mountain in Japan

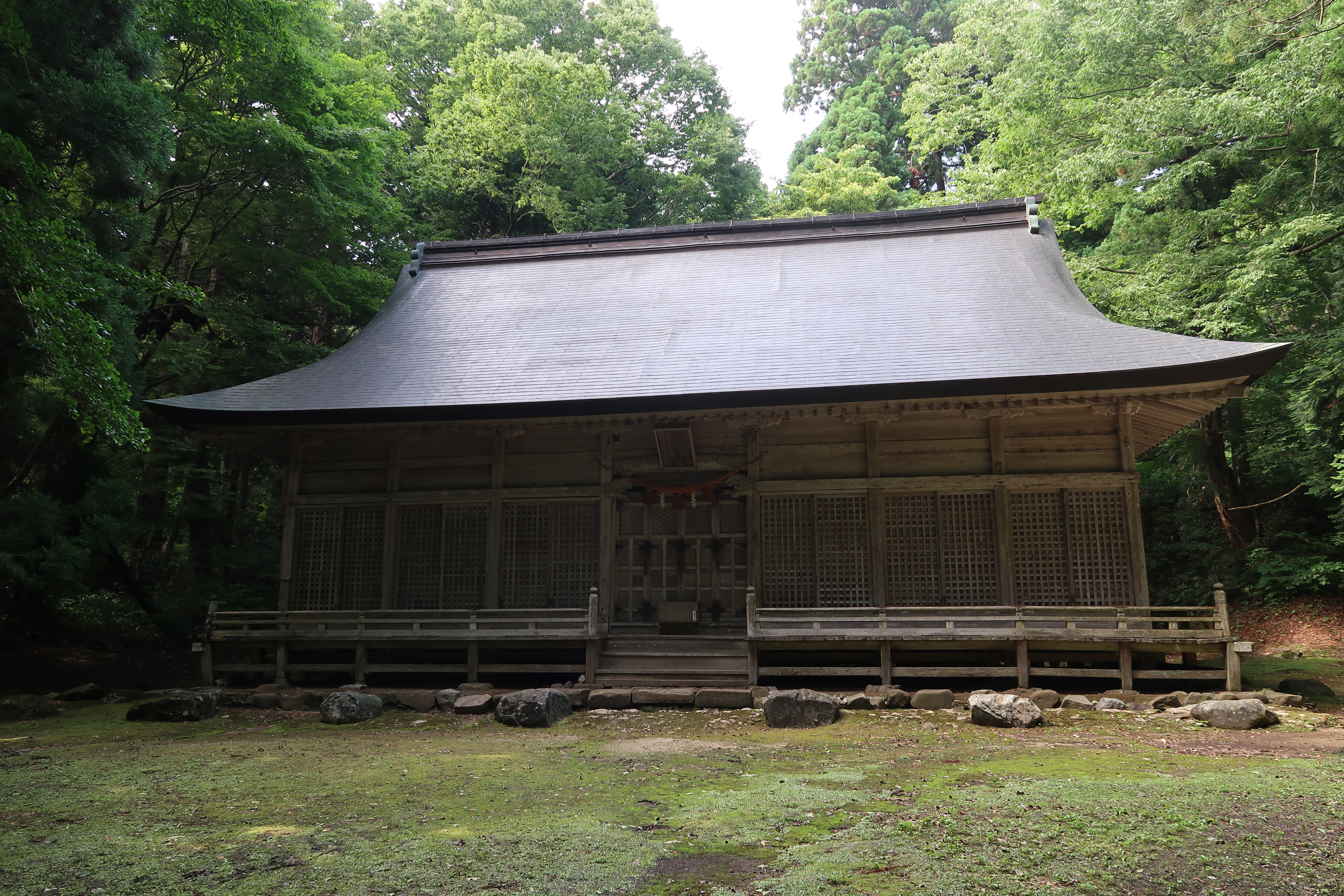
- Isurugi-hiko Jinja on Mount Sekido

Highest point
- Elevation: 564 m (1,850 ft)
- Coordinates: 36°57′56″N 136°58′15″E

Naming
- Native name: 石動山 (Japanese)

Geography
- Location within Ishikawa Prefecture Location within Japan
- Country: Japan
- State: Ishikawa Prefecture
- Region: Hokuriku
- National Historic Site of Japan

Mount Sekidō (石動山, Sekidōzan) is a 564-metre (1,850 ft) mountain on the border of Nanao and Nakanoto in Ishikawa Prefecture and the town of Himi, in Toyama Prefecture. It is also called Mount Isurugi (伊須流岐山, Isurugizan). Mount Sekidō was considered a holy mountain and was the center of a mountain cult since the Heian period. It was designated a National Historic Site of Japan in 1978. It is located with the borders of the Noto Hantō Quasi-National Park.

== Overview ==
A Shinto shrine, the Isurugi-hiko Jinja (伊須流岐比古神社) claims to have been founded in 92 BC, during the reign of the legendary Emperor Suinin, although other records attribute its foundation to the Nara period shugendō monk Taichō in 717 AD. It is listed in the Engishiki records as the Ni-no-miya, or second-most important shrine in Noto Province, and was one of several shrines associated with the cult of Mount Hakusan throughout the Hokuriku region of Japan. During the Nara period, a Shingon Buddhist temple, Taihei-ji, was founded around 749-757 AD, centered around the cult of Kokūzō Bosatsu, and subsumed the shrine under the policy of Shinbutsu-shūgō. As a subsidiary of Ninna-ji in Kyoto Taihei-ji received imperial patronage, and at its height had over 3000 monks in residence in 360 chapels and controlled a kokudaka of 43,000 koku in the provinces of Noto, Kaga, Etchū, Echigo, Sado, Shinano and Hida. In 1341, during the Nanboku-chō period, it was burned down by the forces of Ashikaga Takauji. It was again destroyed by Maeda Toshiie under orders of Oda Nobunaga in 1582. Although Toyotomi Hideyoshi authorized its reconstruction in 1583, and it received support from Kaga Domain under the Tokugawa shogunate, it never regained its former power and prosperity. During the post-Meiji restoration Shinbutsu bunri, what remained of the temple was destroyed and replaced with a rebuilt Isurugi-hiko Jinja under State Shinto. Some relics of the temple can be found at the Sekidōzan Museum (石動山資料館, Sekidōzan shiryōkan) in Nakanoto.

The mountain is located about 30 minutes by car from Yoshikawa Station on the JR West Nanao Line.

== See also ==
- List of Historic Sites of Japan (Ishikawa)
