= Jike Site =

Archaeological site in Hakui, Hokuriku, Japan

Jike Iseki
- 寺家遺跡 (Japanese)
- Jike Site Jike Site (Japan)
- 36°55′12″N 136°46′21″E
- Type: Settlement
- Location: Hakui, Ishikawa, Japan
- Region: Hokuriku region

Site notes
- Public access: No

The Jike Site (寺家遺跡, Jike Iseki) is an archaeological site located in the Jike neighborhood of the city of Hakui, Ishikawa in the Hokuriku region of Japan. The site was designated a National Historic Site of Japan in 2012.

== Overview ==
The Jike Site consists of a number of ruins of a Jōmon and Yayoi period settlement, overlaid with Buddhist temples and Shinto shrines from the Nara and Heian periods, buried in the coastal sand dunes in the Terajima-chō and Yanagida-chō neighbourhoods of the city of Hakui at the base of the Noto Peninsula. The ruins were discovered during the construction of the coastal highway in 1976, and after several years of excavation by Hakui City and Noto Prefectural archaeologists, the large scope of the site and its historical importance was gradually recognised.

The site included the foundations of numerous buildings, including 37 pit dwellings, 44 elevated floor buildings, 22 medieval buildings with earthen walls, salt-making furnaces, blacksmith hearth and other workshops. A wide range of pottery, from Jōmon pottery, Yayoi pottery, Haji ware, Sue ware, Sancai, Dehua porcelain, Celadon and other varieties have been found. Other artifacts include bronze bells, bronze mirrors with a design of sea monsters, coins, and metal fittings. Some of the objects found are identical to ritual objects which have been preserved at the Keta Taisha, which is located 800 meters to the northwest of this site. It is also postulated that this was also a ritual site associated with Keta Taisha, since the buildings are centered on the large pillar buildings in the latter half of the 9th century with a standardized layout.

Furthermore, many of the recovered artifacts indicated a strong connection between this region of Japan and the kingdom of Balhae on the opposite coast of the Sea of Japan, and it is postulated that this was a trading center and a location for the Balhae embassy to stay during its intermittent embassies to the Japanese court. The settlement appears to have been destroyed twice, once in the middle of the Heian period (10th century) and in the late Muromachi period (15th century), from which it never recovered. The site is about 12 minutes by car from Hakui Station on the JR West Nanao Line.

== See also ==
- List of Historic Sites of Japan (Ishikawa)
