= Tōdai-ji Yokoe Shōen =

Archaeological site in Hakusan, Japan

Coordinates: 36°32′57″N 136°34′57″E

Yokoe Shōen Site
- 東大寺領横江荘遺跡 (Japanese)
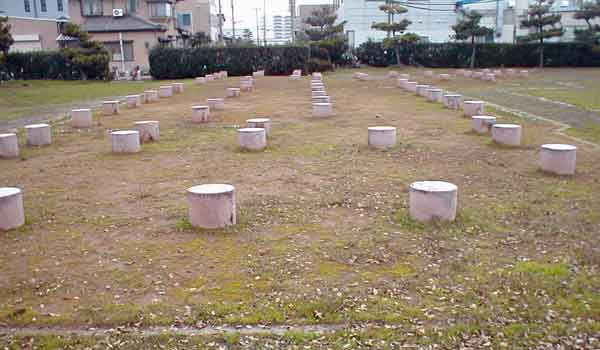
- Yokoe shōen Site

- Yokoe shōen Site Tōdai-ji Yokoe Shōen (Japan)
- Type: settlement
- Periods: Heian period
- Location: Hakusan, Ishikawa, Japan
- Region: Hokuriku region

History
- Built: 9th century

Site notes
- Condition: ruins
- Public access: Yes

The Yokoe Shōen site (横江荘遺跡, Yokoe-no-shō iseki) is an archaeological site consisting of the ruins of a Heian period to Sengoku period shōen located in what is now part of the town of Hakusan, Ishikawa Prefecture in the Hokuriku region Japan. The site been protected as a National Historic Site since 1972.

== Overview ==
The shōen or landed estates were private, tax-free, and autonomous feudal manors which arose with the decline of the ritsuryō system. The earliest shōen developed in the Nara period to encourage land reclamation and provided for the succession of the right to cultivate reclaimed fields in perpetuity. Later shōen developed from land tracts assigned to officially sanctioned Shintō shrines or Buddhist temples or granted by the emperor as gifts to the Imperial relatives, nobles, or officials as tax-free grants. In either case, as these estates grew, they became independent of the civil administrative system and contributed to the rise of a local military class. At first, the hereditary steward of the estate (jitō) paid a portion of his revenues to the nominal "owner" in Kyoto for continued protection from taxes or other interference from the government, but by the Kamakura period, even this nominal relationship faded away.

The Yokoe Shōen was a large manorial estate established in 818 AD by Emperor Kanmu for Crown Princess Asahara, It was inherited by her daughter Princess Sakahito, and was subsequently donated to the great temple of Tōdai-ji in Nara. After several centuries, the estate came under control of the Zen temple of Tenryū-ji in Kyoto.

The ruins of a Heian period manor house was discovered in 1970 during construction of an industrial park near the northeastern end of the alluvial fan formed by the Tedori River. The foundation pillars for a large house, presumably the administrative building of the manor, and a number of warehouses were discovered, along with wooden tags and shards of Sue ware pottery. No roof tiles were found. The wooden tags and pottery shards had inked inscriptions which identified the location as that of the Yokoe Shōen, thus confirming a location which heretofore had only been known in early Heian period historical records. The main building was surrounded by a cloister-like covered corridor, in the manner of contemporary temples.

The site is now an archaeological park, with concrete pillars marking the locations of foundation posts. It is about a 20-minute walk from Nonoichi Station on the JR West Hokuriku Main Line to the ruins of the villa.

From 1984 to 1991, a site called the Kamiaraiya Site (上荒屋遺跡l) on a riverside in what is now part of the city of Kanazawa was excavated. It was found to have been the port facilities for the Yokoe Manor, and the site was added to the National Historic Site designation. The area between the two sites have a number of ruins which have yet to be excavated. The Kamiaraya site is about a 10-minute drive from Matto Station on the Hokuriku Main Line.

== See also ==
- List of Historic Sites of Japan (Ishikawa)
