= Susoezoana Kofun =

- 須曽蝦夷穴古墳 (Japanese)
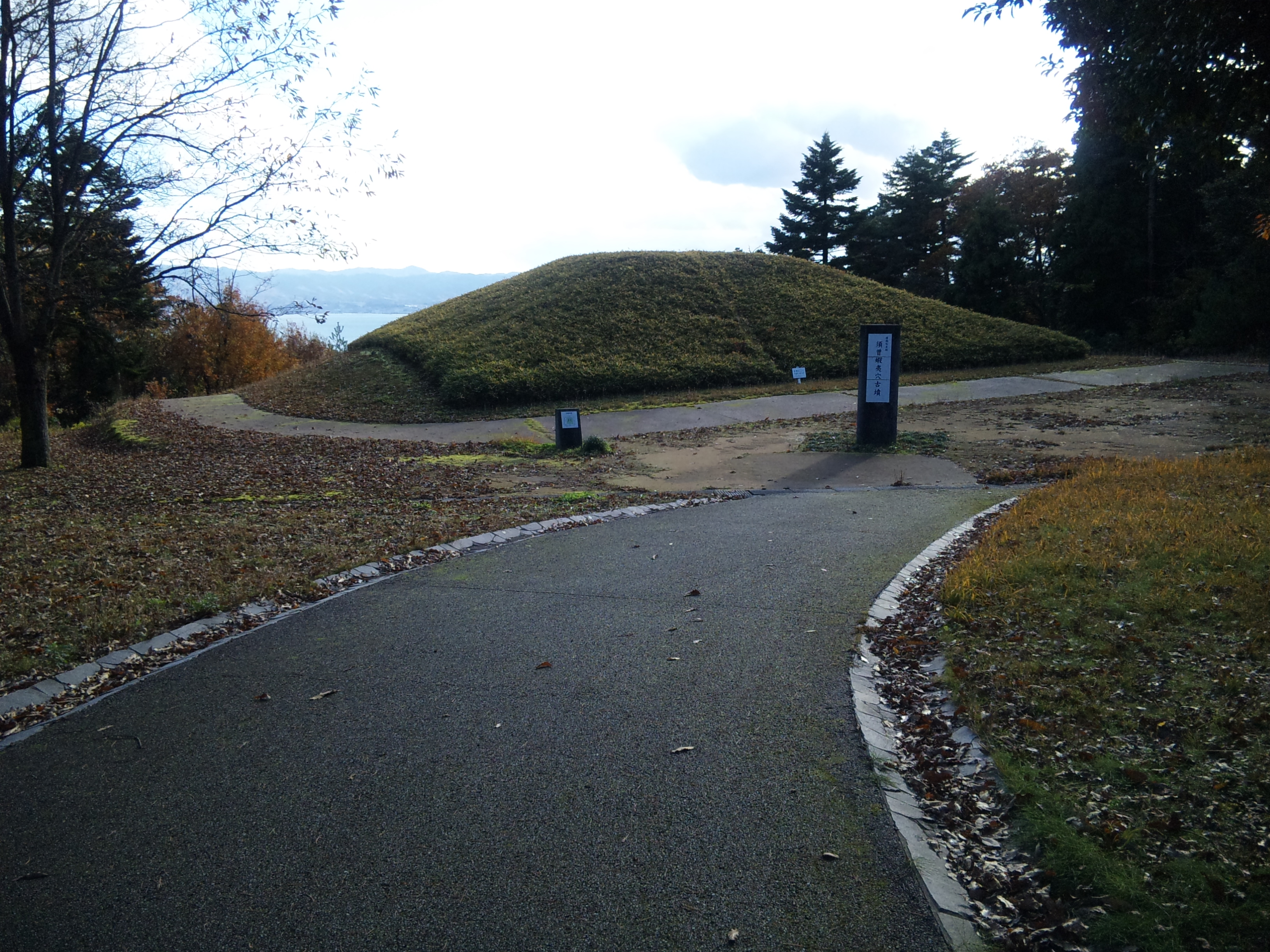

- Susoezoana Kofun Susoezoana Kofun (Japan)
- 37°06′28″N 136°58′00″E
- Type: Kofun
- Location: Nanao, Ishikawa, Japan
- Region: Hokuriku region

History
- Built: Kofun period

Site notes
- Public access: Yes (park, museum)

The Susoezoana Kofun (須曽蝦夷穴古墳, Susoezoana Kofun) is a kofun (burial mound) of the middle Kofun period in the Suso neighbourhood of the city of Nanao, Ishikawa in the Hokuriku region of Japan. The tumulus was designated a National Historic Site of Japan in 1981.

== Overview ==
The Susoezoana Kofun is located on a hill on Notojima, an island within Nanao Bay, at an elevation of approximately 80 meters above sea level. The tumulus is approximately 25 meters square and 4.5 meters tall and is aligned north-to-south. It is unusual in that it contains two lateral hole burial chambers. One chamber is "T-shape" and the other is an inverted "L-shape" and open facing the ocean. Both have a length of roughly seven meters and are made from andesite slabs quarried on Noto island, although the "L-shape" chamber has partially collapsed. The construction method utilizes these stone slabs as bricks, and the ceiling has a corbel arch construction. This is an extremely rare example of a Goguryeo-style tumulus normally found in the northern Korean Peninsula. Both burial chambers have been open since antiquity, and their contents is unknown, but the tumulus of believed to date from the middle of the 7th century, after kofun ceased to be built in other locations of Japan. No other burial mounds have been found in the vicinity of this tumulus.

Although open since antiquity, during an excavation from 1953, fragments of a stone sarcophagus lid, fragments of iron straight swords, Sue ware, Haji ware, and other earthenware shards were found in the ground. The adjacent Ezoana History Center (蝦夷穴歴史センター) exhibits excavated items, photographs of the excavation, and artifacts from other archaeological sites on the island. The tumulus is located about 20 minutes by car from Wakura Onsen Station on the JR West Nanao Line.

== See also ==
- List of Historic Sites of Japan (Ishikawa)
