= Amenomiya Kofun Cluster =

Kofun period tumili in Nakanoto, Japan

Amenomiya Kofun Group
- 雨の宮古墳群 (Japanese)
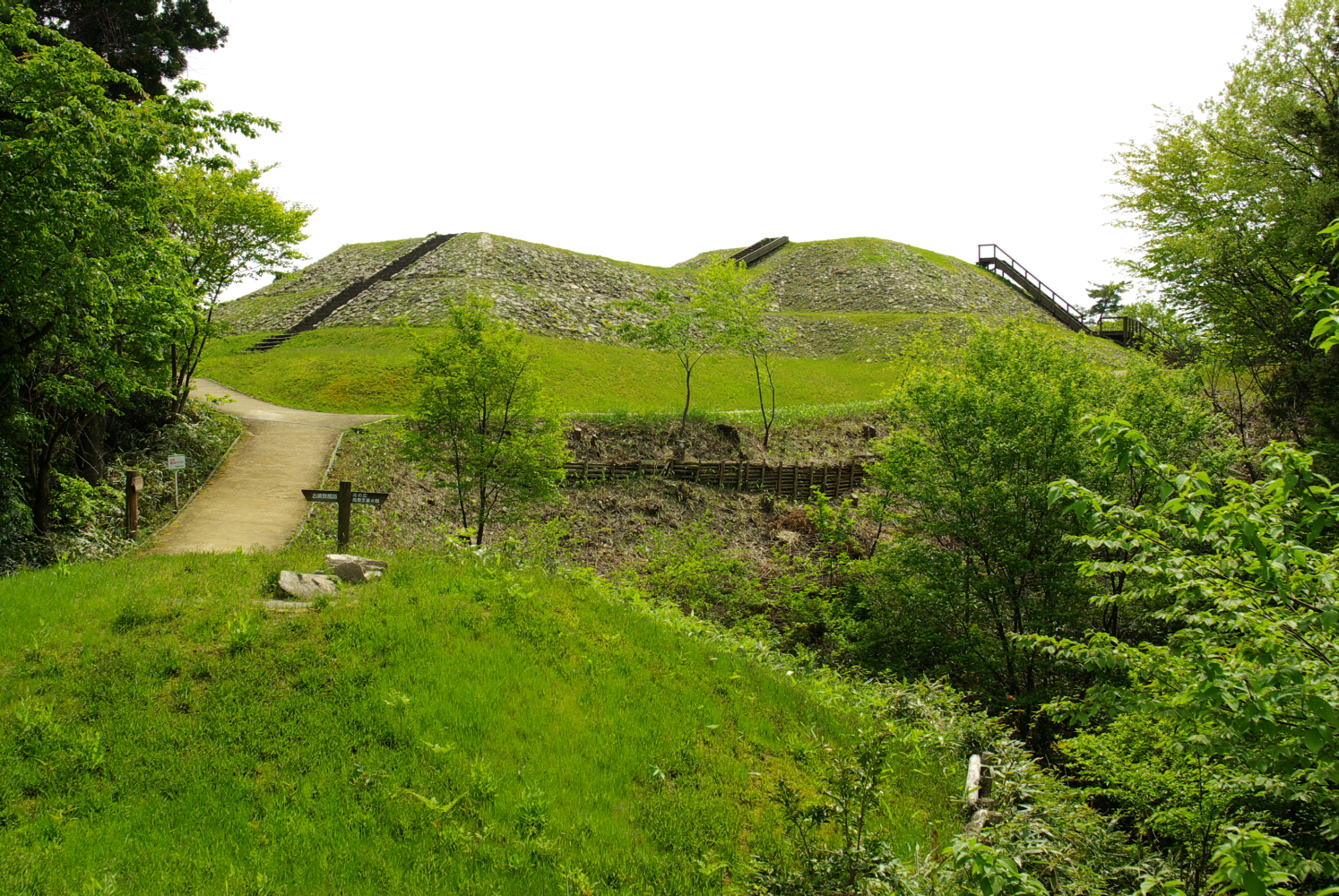
- Amenomiya Kofun Group

- Amenomiya Kofun Group Amenomiya Kofun Cluster (Japan)
- 36°58′15″N 136°51′38″E
- Type: Kofun
- Periods: Kofun period
- Location: Nakanoto, Ishikawa, Japan
- Region: Hokuriku region

Site notes
- Area: 79,045 m^{2} (850,830 sq ft)
- Public access: Yes (archaeological park)

The Amenomiya Kofun Group (雨の宮古墳群, Amenomiya kofun-gun) is a group of middle Kofun period burial tumuli located in the Rokusei neighborhood of the town of Nakanoto, Ishikawa in the Hokuriku region of Japan. The site was designated a National Historic Site of Japan in 1982.

== Overview ==
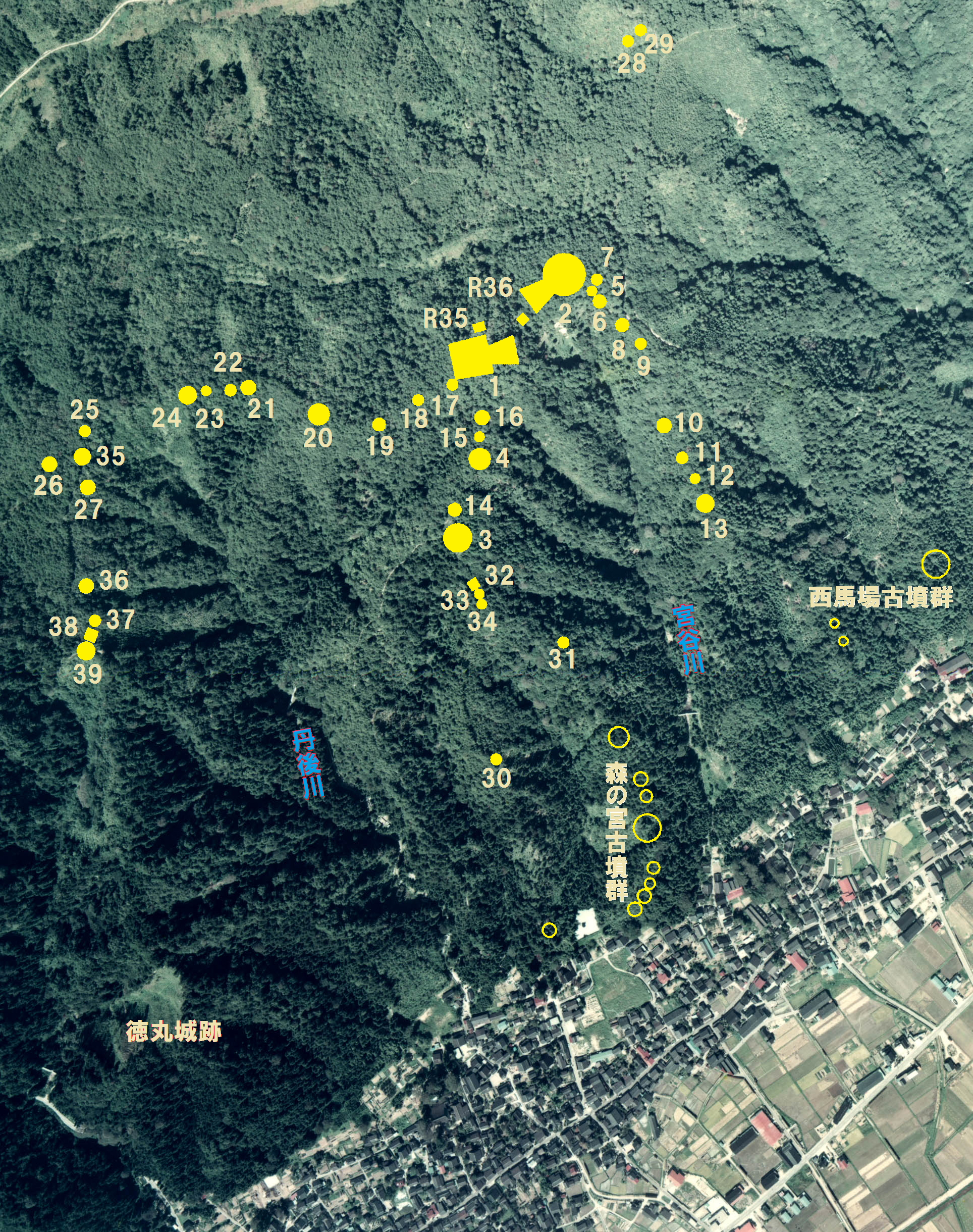
Map of the Amenomiya kofun group

The Amenomiya Kofun Group consists of 36 ancient tombs dating from the middle of the 4th century to the beginning of the 5th century centered on Mount Bijo-san, a 188-meter hill in Nakanoto.

Tomb No.1, located on the highest elevation is the largest "two conjoined rectangles" type (zenpō-kōhō-fun (前方後方墳)) tumulus in Ishikawa Prefecture, with an overall length of 64 meters. The posterior is 43.6 meters long by 8.5 meters high and the anterior is 31 meters long. It was made by partially cutting away a natural hill, and by using two different types of soil in alternate layers for strength and stability. It is a two-stage tumulus and was covered with fukiishi. These fukiishi are in three sizes, with larger stones 40 to 60 centimeters used in the bottom tier, smaller stones 2 to 30 centimeters in the upper tier, and smallest stones (10 centimeters) as filler in-between the larger stones. The stones are in a variety of materials, some of which can only be found at considerable distances from the site. Two burial facilities were confirmed on the flat surface at the posterior top. The first is located approximately in the center, and the second burial facility is located to the west of it. The burial chamber contained a split bamboo-shaped wooden coffin that was 6.2 meters long and 80 centimeters wide with a rope hook on both the lid and the body. There is evidence that it was robbed in antiquity; however, some remaining grave goods included a bronze mirror, 165 metal artifacts, 34 jade beads, and fragments of lacquerware and pottery. These artifacts were collectively designated an Important Cultural Property of Japan in 2008. The second burial chamber is made of andesite stone slabs, but has not been opened. A portion of the tumulus was damaged by the 2007 Noto earthquake.

Tomb No.2 is a round keyhole-shaped tumulus, zenpō-kōen-fun (前方後円墳), having one square end and one circular end, located to the northeast of Tomb No.1. It has an overall length of 65 meters, with a circular portion 42 meters in diameter, and the width of the rectangular port of 28 meters, narrowing in 25.5 meter where the two portions join. It also has two tier construction and uses fukiishi. There is no evidence of tampering, and it is possible that the burial chamber is intact; it has not been excavated. The other tumuli in the cluster are mostly smaller circular-type (empun (円墳)).

Per the Ishikawa Archaeological Society, the tumuli are as follows:

Designation	Type	Diameter	Height (m)	Comments
1号墳	co-joined rectangle			See text above
2号墳	keyhole-shaped			See text above
3号墳	Circular	30	4.5	known as "Atagozuka"
4号墳	Circular	20	2.5	evidence of grave robbery
5号墳	Circular	13	2	
6号墳	Circular	12.5	1.5～2	
7号墳	Circular	8	2	
8号墳	Circular	12	1.5	
9号墳	Circular	10	1.5	irregular shape; may be a natural hill
10号墳	Circular	14	1.8	
11号墳	Circular	12	1.5	
12号墳	Circular	8	1.5	irregular shape; may be a natural hill
13号墳	Circular	17	2.8	
14号墳	Circular	10	1.0	
15号墳	Circular	6	0.8	irregular shape; may be a natural hill
16号墳	Circular	8	1.0	bisected by a road
17号墳	Circular	16	1.5	stone sarcophagus found
18号墳	Circular	unknown	unknown	only the edges remain
19号墳	Circular	unknown	unknown	only the edges remain
20号墳	Circular	22	2.2	low mound, like a cushion
21号墳	Circular	12	1.5	irregular shape; may be a natural hill
22号墳	Circular	13	1.8	Modified on one side
23号墳	Circular	11	2.0	Modified on one side
24号墳	Circular	18	2.5	Modified on one side
25号墳	Circular	unknown	unknown	only the edges remain
26号墳	Circular	20	2.5～3	mostly destroyed
27号墳	Circular	15	1	possibly square-shaped
28号墳	Circular	12	1.2	may be a natural hill
29号墳	Circular	12	1.2	may be a natural hill
30号墳	Circular	10	1.2	irregular shape; may be a natural hill
31号墳	Circular	12	2	irregular shape; may be a natural hill
32号墳	Oval	9.0×14.0	1.3～1.0	
33号墳	Circular	7.0	0.5～0.0	
34号墳	Circular	9.0	1.0～0.0	
35号墳	Circular	21	2.0～1.0	damaged by road on the west
36号墳	Circular	7.0	0.5	damaged by road on the west
37号墳	Circular	10.0	0.5	
38号墳	Square	8.5×10.0	0.5	
39号墳	Circular	13.0	2.5～1.0	damaged on the south side
R35号墳	Square (?)	10～5	0.5	Debris from No.1; possibly not a tomb
R36号墳	Square	11	0.5	beads found; possibly a ritual site and not a tomb

The site is preserved as an archaeological park, with the Ame-no-miya Noto Royal Tomb Museum (雨の宮能登王墓の館, Ame no miya Noto ō bo no yakata). It is located about 30 minutes by car from Notobe Station on the JR West Nanao Line.

== Gallery ==
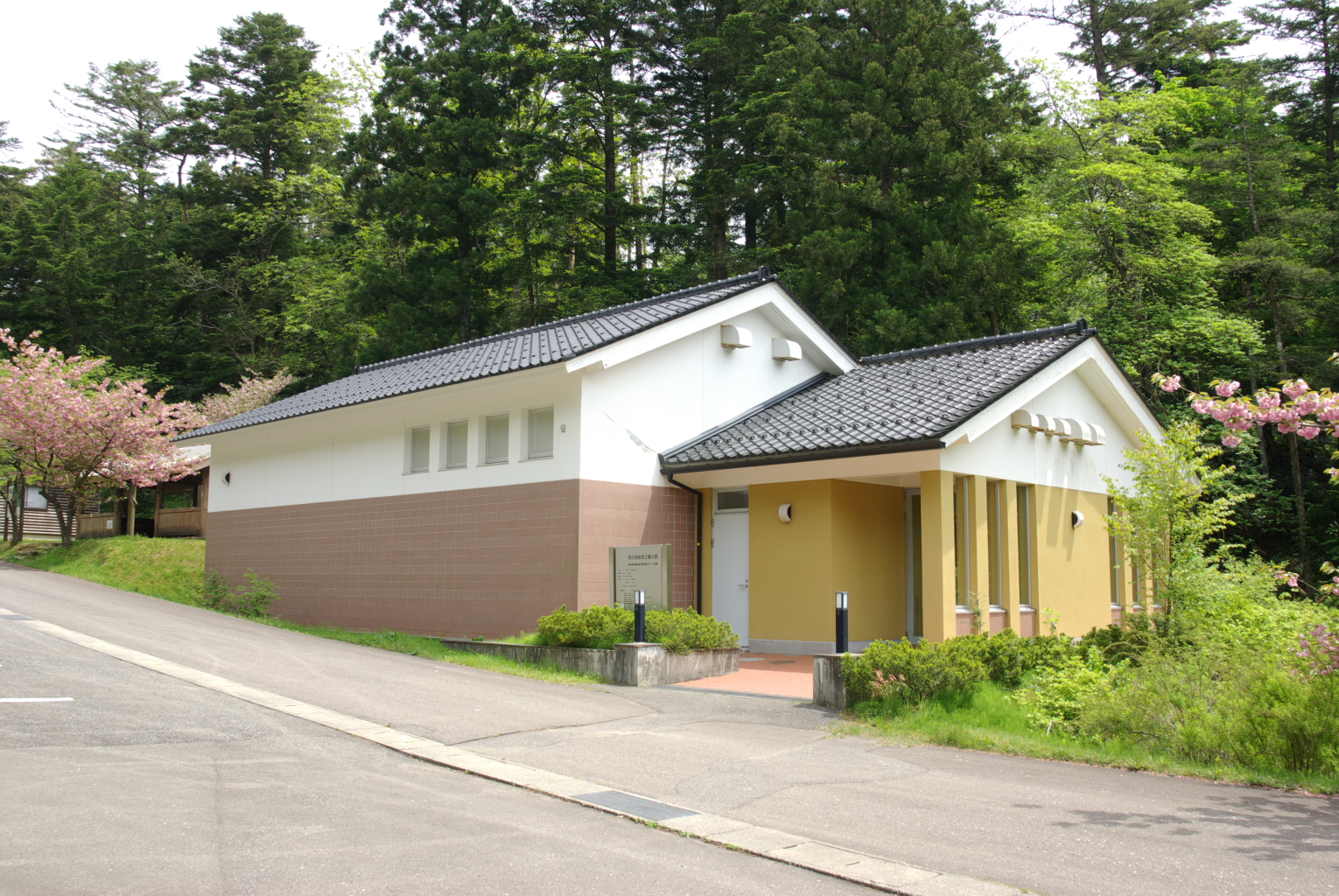
Ame-no-miya Noto Royal Tomb Museum

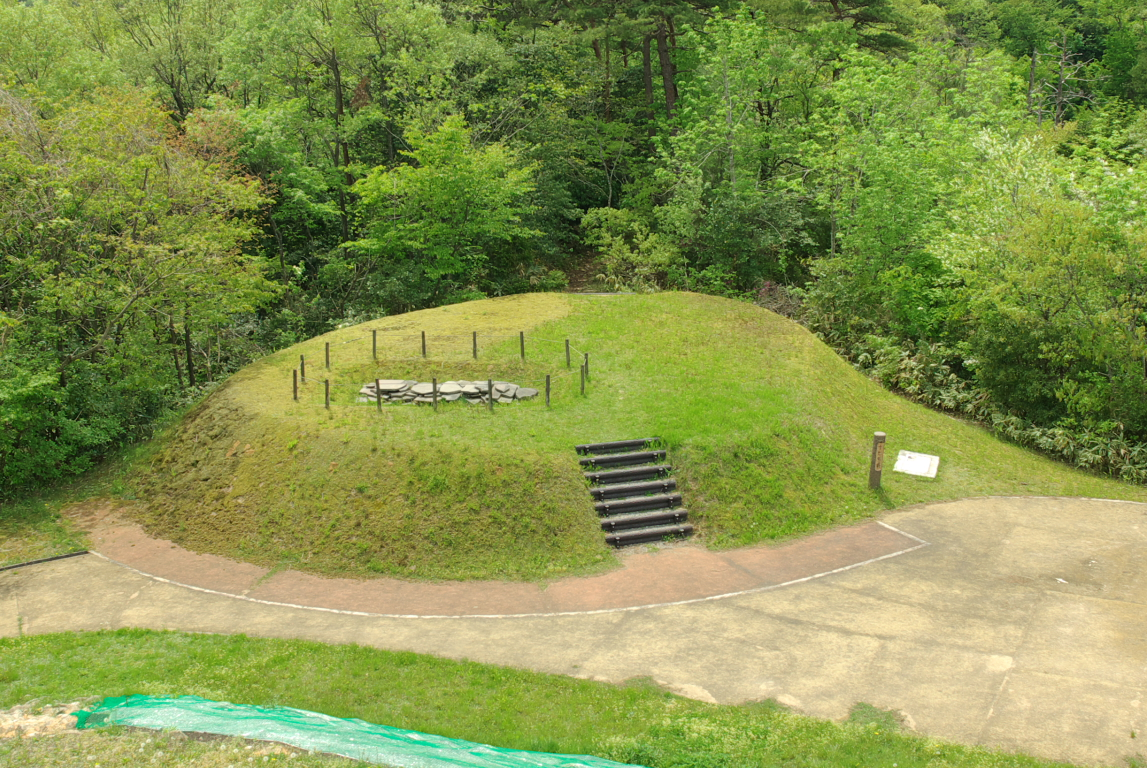
Amenomiya Tumulus No.17

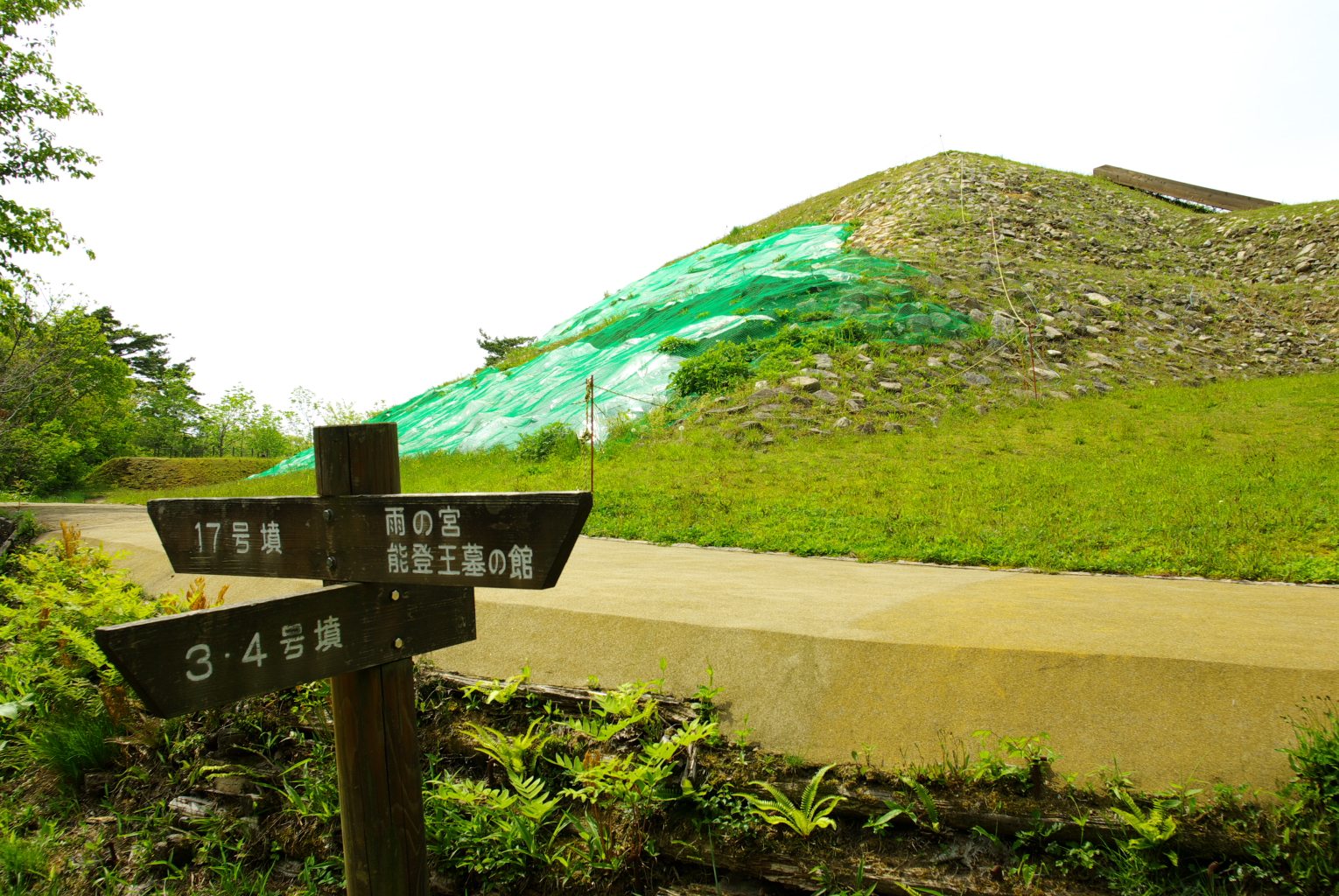
Damage to Amenomiya Tumulus No.1

== See also ==
- List of Historic Sites of Japan (Ishikawa)
