= List of historic sites of Japan (Ishikawa) =

This list is of the historic sites of Japan located within the Prefecture of Ishikawa.

== National Historic Sites ==
As of 1 August 2025, twenty-seven Sites have been designated as being of national significance, including the Kaga Domain Maeda Clan Graves and Kaetsu border castle ruins, which span the prefectural borders with Toyama.

Site	Municipality	Comments	Image	Coordinates	Type	Ref.
Chikamori Site チカモリ遺跡 Chikamori iseki	Kanazawa	Jōmon period settlement trace	Chikamori Site	36°33′22″N 136°36′17″E	1	1018
Amenomiya Kofun Cluster 雨の宮古墳群 Amenomiya kofun-gun	Nakanoto	Kofun period tumuli cluster	Amenomiya Kofun Cluster	36°58′15″N 136°51′38″E	1	1015
Kamo Site 加茂遺跡 Kamo iseki	Tsubata	Nara period settlement trace		36°41′09″N 136°43′35″E	2, 6	00003892
Yoshizaki-Suba Site 吉崎・次場遺跡 Yoshizaki-Suba iseki	Hakui	Yayoi period settlement trace	Yoshizaki-Suba Site	36°54′20″N 136°47′24″E	1	1016
Kanazawa Castle Site 金沢城跡 Kanazawa-jō ato	Kanazawa	Edo period castle	Kanazawa Castle Site	36°33′58″N 136°39′33″E	2	00003596
Kutani Ware Kiln Site 九谷磁器窯跡 Kutani-jiki kama ato	Kaga	Edo period kiln ruins	Kutani Ware Kiln Site	36°12′04″N 136°25′18″E	6	1011
Kitsuneyama Kofun 狐山古墳 Kitsuneyama kofun	Kaga	Kofun period tumulus	Kitsuneyama Kofun	36°18′30″N 136°22′46″E	1	992
Okyōzuka Site 御経塚遺跡 Okyōzuka iseki	Nonoichi	Jōmon period settlement trace	Okyōzuka Site	36°32′47″N 136°35′57″E	1	1009
Sandenkanaya Kofun 散田金谷古墳 Sandenkanaya kofun	Hōdatsushimizu	Kofun period tumulus		36°51′20″N 136°48′58″E	1	1013
Jike Site 寺家遺跡 Jike iseki	Hakui	Jōmon/Yayoi period settlement trace	Jike Site	36°55′12″N 136°46′21″E	1	00003746
Nanao Castle ruins 七尾城跡 Nanao-jō ato	Nanao	Sengoku period castle ruins	Nanao Castle Site	37°00′41″N 136°58′53″E	2	993
Suzu Pottery Kiln Sites 珠洲陶器窯跡 Suzu-tōki kama ato	Suzu, Noto	Kamakura period kiln ruins		37°23′43″N 137°12′40″E	6	00003600
Kamiyamada Shell Mound 上山田貝塚 Kamiyamada kaizuka	Kahoku	Jōmon period shell midden	Kamiyamada Shell Mound	36°43′01″N 136°43′01″E	1	1014
Mawaki Site 真脇遺跡 Mawaki iseki	Noto	Jōmon period settlement trace	Mawaki Site	37°18′20″N 137°12′27″E	1	1019
Susoezoana Kofun 須曽蝦夷穴古墳 Susoezoana kofun	Nanao	Kofun period tumulus	Susoezoana Kofun	37°06′28″N 136°58′00″E	1	1012
Mount Sekidō 石動山 Sekidōsan	Nakanoto	holy mountain in Nara/Heian periods	Mount Sekidō	36°57′30″N 136°58′23″E	3	1010
Tatsumi Canal 辰巳用水附土清水塩硝蔵跡 Tatsumi yōsui tsuketari Tsutchōzu enshō-gura ato	Kanazawa	Edo period civil engineering; designation includes the site of the Tsutchōzu nitre warehouse	Tatsumi Canal	36°33′33″N 136°39′59″E	6	00003660
Torigoe Castle ruins 鳥越城跡附二曲城跡 Torigoe-jō ato tsuketari Futoge-jō ato	Hakusan	Sengoku period castle ruins; designation includes the site of Futoge Castle	Torigoe Castle Site	36°21′58″N 136°36′04″E	2	1017
Tōdai-ji Yokoe Shōen ruins 東大寺領横江荘遺跡 Tōdaiji-ryō Yokoe-no-shō iseki	Kanazawa, Hakusan	Heian period settlement trace; designation includes the Yokoe Manor House (pictured) and Kamiaraya (上荒屋遺跡)	Torigoe Castle Site	36°32′57″N 136°34′57″E	6	1005
Noto Kokubun-ji ruins 能登国分寺跡附建物群跡 Noto Kokubunji ato tsuketari tatemono-gun ato	Nanao	Nara/Heian period provincial temple of Noto Province	Noto Kokubunji Site	37°01′30″N 136°57′27″E	3	1006
Nomi Kofun Cluster 能美古墳群 Nomi kofun-gun	Nomi	Kofun period tumuli cluster; designation comprises five clusters of kofun: the Teraiyama Kofun Cluster (寺井山古墳群), Wadayama Kofun Cluster (和田山古墳群), Matsujiyama Kofun Cluster (末寺山古墳群), Akitsuneyama Kofun Cluster (秋常山古墳群), and Nishiyama Kofun Cluster (西山古墳群)	Nomi Kofun Cluster	36°26′50″N 136°30′34″E	1	1007
Hōōzan Cave Tombs 法皇山横穴古墳 Hōōzan yokoana kofun	Kaga	Kofun period cave-tombs	Hōōzan Cave Tombs	36°17′57″N 136°23′35″E	1	991
Suematsu temple ruins 末松廃寺跡 Suematsu Haiji ato	Nonoichi	Asuka period temple ruins	Suematsu Haiji Site	36°30′29″N 136°35′23″E	3	996
Mangyō Site 万行遺跡 Mangyō iseki	Nanao	Yayoi/Kofun period settlement trace		37°02′44″N 136°59′35″E	1	3376
Kaga Domain Maeda Clan Graves 加賀藩主前田家墓所 Kaga-han-shu Maeda-ke bosho	Kanazawa	Edo period cemetery; designation includes an area of Takaoka in Toyama Prefecture	Kaga Domain Maeda Clan Graves	36°31′45″N 136°40′06″E	7	00003621
Kaetsu border castle ruins 加越国境城跡群及び道 切山城跡 松根城跡 小原越 Kaetsu-kuni-zakai shiro ato-gun oyobi michi Kiriyama-jō ato Matsune-jō ato Ohara-goe	Kanazawa	designation includes the sites of Kiriyama Castle, Matsune Castle, and Ohara Pass and an area of Oyabe in Toyama Prefecture	Kaetsu Territory Castle Sites and Roads	36°36′58″N 136°47′00″E	6	00003879
Daishōji Castle Site 大聖寺城跡; Daishōji-jō ato	Kaga			36°18′32″N 136°18′19″E	2	

== Prefectural Historic Sites ==
As of 1 May 2024, twenty-four Sites have been designated as being of prefectural importance.

Site	Municipality	Comments	Image	Coordinates	Type	Ref.
Ataka Barrier Site 安宅の関跡; Ataka no seki ato	Komatsu			36°25′10″N 136°25′05″E		
Yoshimitsu Ichirizuk 吉光の一里塚; Yoshimitsu no ichirizuka	Nomi			36°27′10″N 136°29′58″E		
Chūda Stele 中段の板碑; Chūda no itabi	Wajima	inscribed Shōō 5 (1292)		37°23′01″N 136°53′01″E		
Gobyō Valley 御廟谷; Gobyō-tani	Kanazawa	graves to the south of Tako Castle (高尾城)		36°30′16″N 136°37′41″E		
Taira Takitada clan cemetery 平時忠卿及びその一族の墳; Taira Takitada oyobi ichisoku no haka	Suzu			37°29′18″N 137°11′43″E		
Asainawate Battlefield 浅井畷古戦場; Asainawate ko-senjō	Komatsu			36°22′58″N 136°27′04″E		
Former Fukura Lighthouse 旧福浦灯台 kyū-Fukura-tōdai	Shika			37°04′59″N 136°43′23″E		
Ishibotokeyama Ritual Site 祭祀遺跡石仏山 saishi iseki Ishibotokeyama	Noto	matsuri on 1–2 March		37°16′13″N 137°03′41″E		
Shibagaki Kofun Cluster 柴垣古墳群; Shibagaki kofun-gun	Hakui			36°56′49″N 136°45′54″E		
Innaichokushizuka Kofun 院内勅使塚古墳; Innaichokushizuka kofun	Nanao			37°00′22″N 136°55′55″E		
Ushitsusakiyama Jōmon Site 宇出津崎山縄文遺跡; Ushitsusakiyama Jōmon iseki	Noto			37°18′03″N 137°09′01″E		
Pine-lined Former Entrance to Kanazawa 松並木の旧金沢下口往還 matsunamiki no kyū-Kanazawa shimoguchi ōkan	Kanazawa			36°37′32″N 136°42′01″E		
Uketsukagoshi No.1 Kofun 宇気塚越一号墳; Uketsukagoshi ichigō-fun	Kahoku			36°43′49″N 136°42′54″E		
Jitō-machi Mediaeval Cave Tombs (Yagura) 地頭町中世墳墓窟(やぐら)群; Jitō-machi chūsei funbo-gutsu (yagura) gun	Shika			37°08′08″N 136°43′47″E		
Kanmachi Mandara Kofun Cluster 上町マンダラ古墳群; Kanmachi Mandara kofun-gun	Nanao			37°07′19″N 136°50′37″E		
Yōkō-ji 永光寺; Yōkōji	Hakui			36°54′46″N 136°51′04″E		
Myōsen-ji Stone Tō Group 明泉寺石塔群在地; Myōsenji sekitō-gun zaichi	Anamizu			37°13′49″N 137°03′25″E		
Akakurayama 赤蔵山; Akakurayama	Nanao			37°02′41″N 136°52′00″E		
Suemori Castle ruins 末森城跡; Suemori-jō ato	Hōdatsushimizu			36°50′02″N 136°46′43″E		
Ōumi-Nishiyama Site 大海西山遺跡; Ōumi-Nishiyama iseki	Kahoku			36°46′32″N 136°45′20″E		
Kiya Site 気屋遺跡; Kiya iseki	Kahoku			36°43′29″N 136°43′45″E		
Ishinotatezuka 石の木塚; Ishinotatezuka	Hakusan			36°30′44″N 136°30′27″E		
Otachi Fortified Residence Site 御舘館跡; Otachi tate ato	Hōdatsushimizu			36°47′56″N 136°46′03″E		
Hokkoku Kaidō Kurikara Pass Road 北国街道倶利伽羅峠道; Hokkoku kaidō Kurikara-tōge michi	Tsubata			36°39′42″N 136°49′00″E		

== Municipal Historic Sites ==
As of 1 May 2024, a further one hundred and seventy-nine Sites have been designated as being of municipal importance.

== See also ==
- Cultural Properties of Japan
- Kaga Province
- Noto Province
- Ishikawa Prefectural History Museum
- List of Places of Scenic Beauty of Japan (Ishikawa)
- List of Cultural Properties of Japan - paintings (Ishikawa)
