= Kitsuneyama Kofun =

Kofun period grave site in Kaga, Japan

- 狐山古墳 (Japanese)
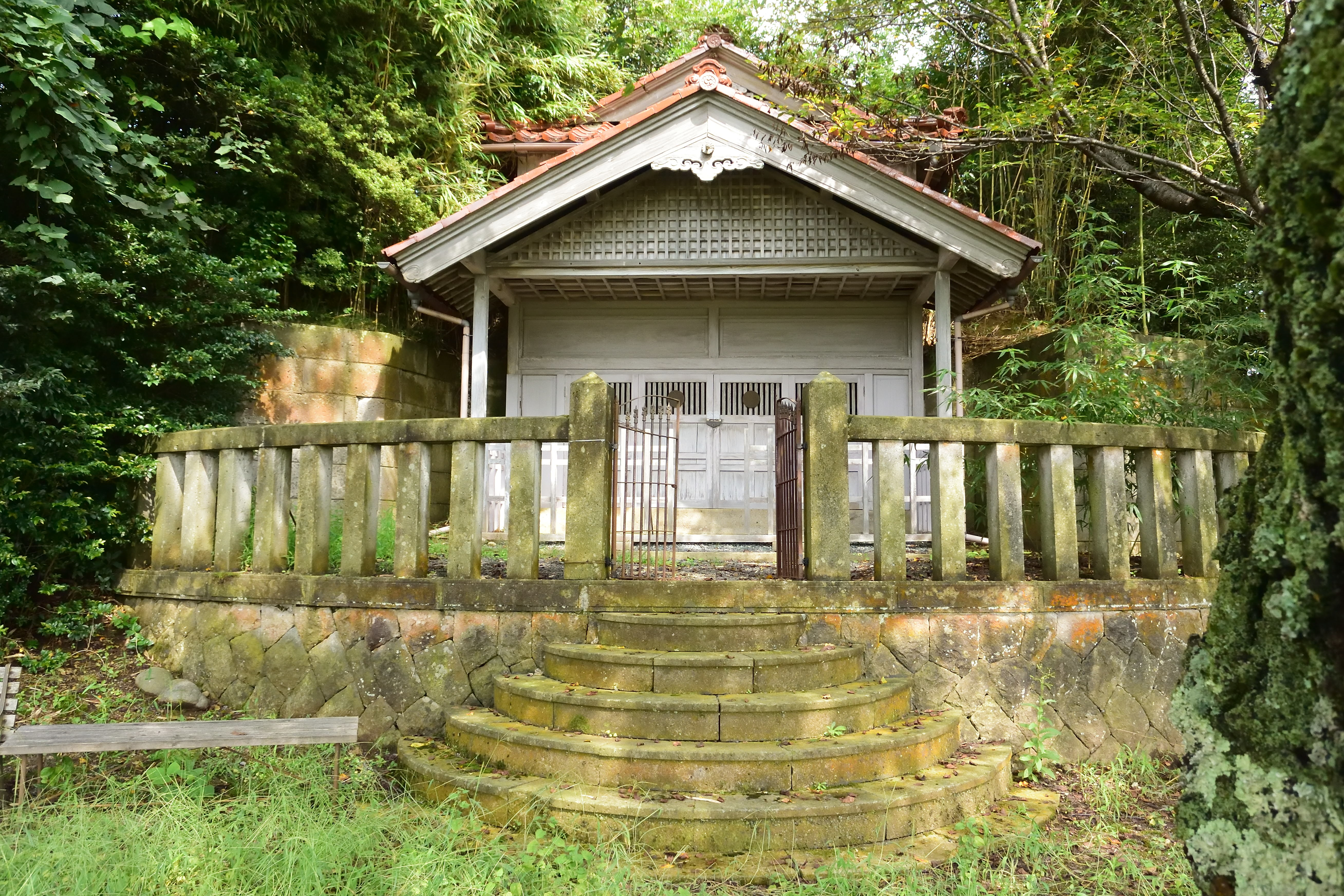
- Kitsuneyama Kofun

- Kitsuneyama Kofun Kitsuneyama Kofun (Japan)
- 36°18′30″N 136°22′46″E
- Type: Kofun
- Location: Kaga, Ishikawa, Japan
- Region: Hokuriku region

History
- Built: Kofun period

Site notes
- Public access: Yes

The Kitsuneyama Kofun (狐山古墳) is a middle Kofun period keyhole-shaped tumulus located in the Futagozukamachi neighborhood of the city of Kaga, Ishikawa in the Hokuriku region of Japan. The tumulus was designated a National Historic Site of Japan in 1932.

== Overview ==
The Kitsuneyama Kofun is a zenpō-kōen-fun (前方後円墳), which is shaped like a keyhole, having one square end and one circular end, when viewed from above. It is located in the middle of rice paddies some 200 meters north of the city center of Kaga, and is the only keyhole-shaped tumulus in the Kaga Plains. The tumulus is orientated east-west, and has a total length of 54 meters. The posterior circular portion is 29 meters in diameter and the anterior rectangular portion is 25 meters in width. The tumulus was surrounded by a moat with an average width of 10 meters. During construction work in 1952, a 2.7 meter long sarcophagus made of tuff was discovered during construction work. Inside were the bone of a youth, along with an extraordinary amount of grave goods, including iron weapons, bronze mirrors, fragments armor, jewelry (silver bands, gold and copper balls, round and tubular beads).

During archaeological excavation of the moat from 1973 to 1974, haniwa fragments and many stones thought to be fukiishi were discovered. These artifacts date the tumulus to the later half of the fifth century, and from the quality and quantity of items, this must have been the tomb of a local king with a close relationship to the Kansai region of Japan.

- Total length 55.8 meters
- Anterior rectangular portion; 26.5meter width, 5.1 meter height
- Posterior circular portion: 26.5 meter diameter, 6.5 meter height

In a subsequent survey, an additional 36 kofun (one keyhole-shaped, and 35 dome-shaped) have been discovered in the surrounding area. Currently, some of the excavated artifacts from the site are stored at the Tokyo National Museum. A shelter has been built over the sarcophagus so that it can be viewed through a window. The tumulus is located about seven minutes by car from Iburihashi Station on the JR West Hokuriku Main Line.

From 1960, the site has also been registered as an "Ishikawa Prefecture Cultural Property".

== See also ==
- List of Historic Sites of Japan (Ishikawa)
