= Mangyō Site =

- 万行遺跡 (Japanese)
- Mangyō Site Mangyō Site (Japan)
- 37°02′44″N 136°59′35″E
- Type: Settlement
- Location: Nanao, Ishikawa, Japan
- Region: Hokuriku region

History
- Built: Yayoi to Kofun period

Site notes
- Public access: Yes (no public facilities)

The Mangyō Site (万行遺跡, Mangyō Iseki) is an archaeological site containing the remnants of a late Yayoi period to late Kofun period settlement located in the Mangyō neighborhood of the city of Nanao, Ishikawa in the Hokuriku region of Japan. The site was designated a National Historic Site of Japan in 2003.

== Overview ==
The Mangyō Site is located on the east side of the Noto Peninsula at an elevation of seven meters above the present sea level of Nanao Bay on the Sea of Japan. It is on the tip of a fluvial terrace of the Usuike River about two kilometers west of the downtown of Nanao. Per an archaeological excavation conducted in 1998, the site was found to be complex, containing relics from the Jōmon period into early modern times. The site contains the remnants of many pit dwellings, along with several groups of very large foundation posts, approximately a meter in diameter and set to a depth of 1.6 meters, with a spacing of approximately 4.3 meters between pillars. The number of holes was 60, and from the spatial orientation it was determined that these were the foundations for six large raised-floor structures, each with a surface area of 150 to 320 square meters, arranged in groups of three buildings on the west and three buildings on the west of the site. It is surmised that these were either warehouses or had a ceremonial or governmental role. Pottery and other artifacts found at the site date it to the late 3rd to early 4th century AD, of a transitional phase between the late Yayoi and early Kofun periods.

The site was backfilled after excavation and is now an empty field. It is located about 10 minutes by car from Nanao Station on the JR West Nanao Line.

== See also ==
- List of Historic Sites of Japan (Ishikawa)
