= Nomi Kofun Cluster =

Group of burial mounds in Japan

- 能美古墳群 (Japanese)
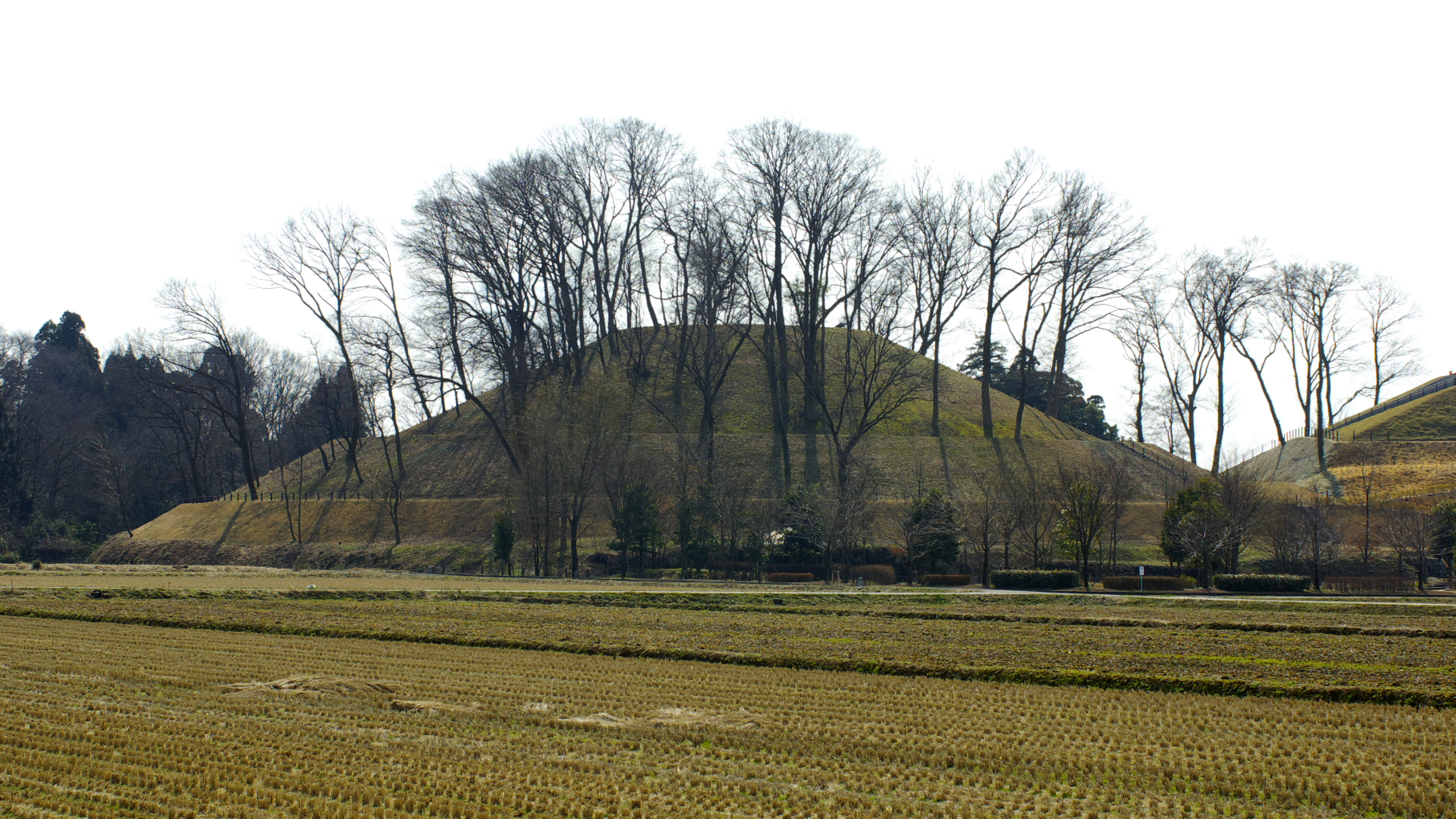
- Akitsuneyama No.1 Kofun

- Nomi Kofun Cluster Nomi Kofun Cluster (Japan)
- 36°26′50″N 136°30′34″E
- Type: Kofun
- Periods: Kofun period
- Location: Nomi, Ishikawa, Japan
- Region: Hokuriku region

Site notes
- Area: 134,942 m^{2} (1,452,500 sq ft)
- Public access: Yes (no public facilities)

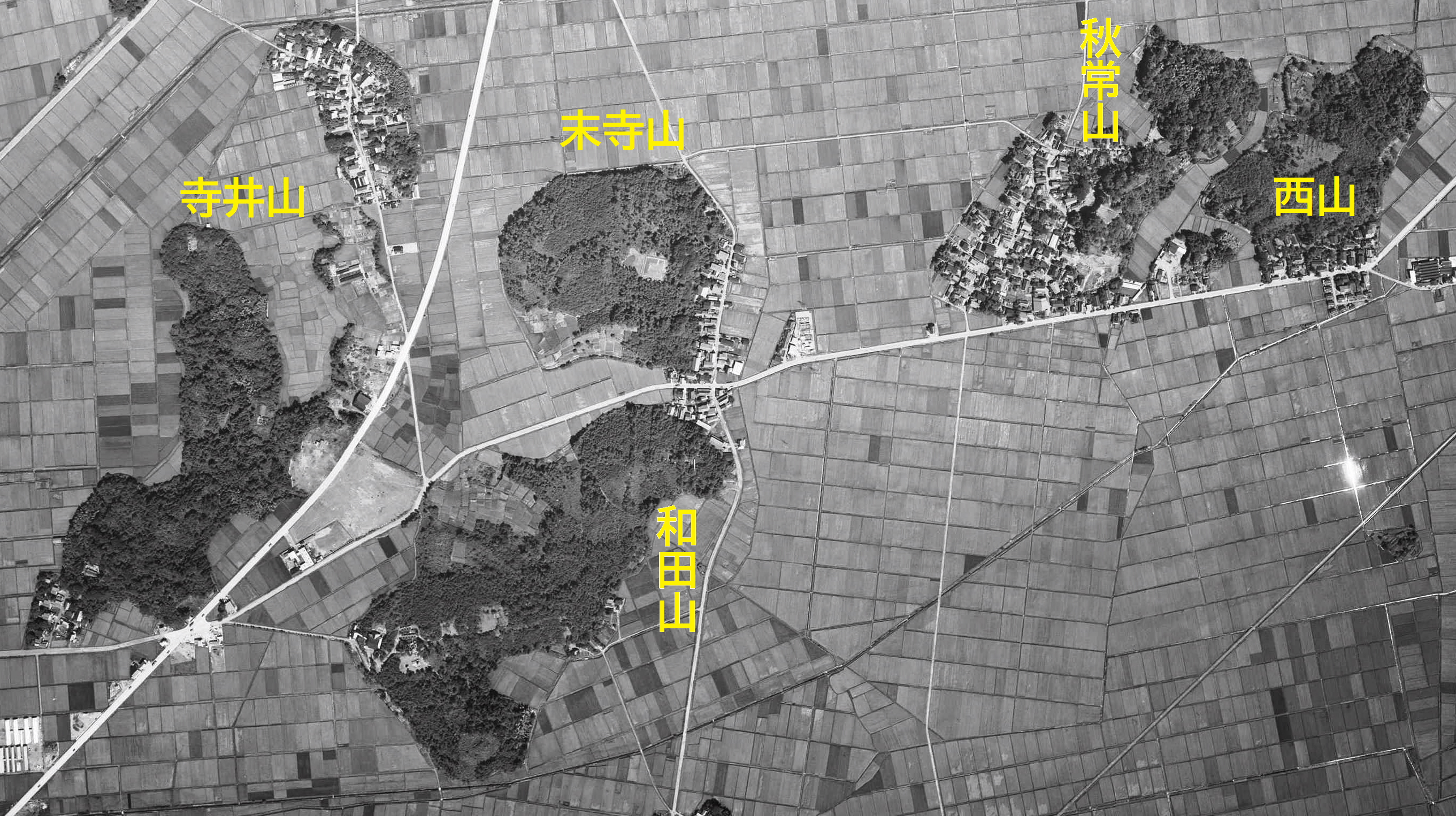
Map of Nomi Kofun Cluster site

The Nomi Kofun Cluster (能美古墳群) consists of five groups of kofun burial mounds in Terai, Ishikawa (now part of the city of Nomi, Ishikawa) in the Hokuriku region of Japan. Two of these kofun clusters were collectively designated a National Historic Site of Japan in 1975, with the Akitsuneyama Kofun Cluster added in 1998 and expanded in 2000, and the Teraiyama and Nishiyama clusters added in 2013.

== Overview ==
The Nomi Kofun Cluster consists of total of 62 kofun scattered in the plains of Nomi city. The tumuli are in various shapes and sizes and include two keyhole-shaped tombs (zenpō-kōen-fun (前方後円墳), which are shaped like a keyhole, having one square end and one circular end, when viewed from above). The construction dates of these tumuli span the range of the Kofun period, from the 3rd to the 6th centuries AD. A large number of grave goods have been recovered from various of these tumuli, and include six "bell-mirrors", bronze weapons, armor and horse fittings, as well as Sue ware pottery.

Types of kofun in the Nomi Kofun Cluster (surviving in parentheses)
	zenpō-kōen-fun	zenpō-kōhō-fun	empun	hōfun	Indeterminate	Total
Teraiyama Kofun Cluster 寺井山古墳群	-	-	1 (1)	-	6 (0)	7 (1)
Wadayama Kofun Cluster 和田山古墳群	1 (0)	-	14 (13)	2 (0)	6 (3)	23 (19)
Matsujiyama Kofun Cluster 末寺山古墳群	-	3 (3)	6 (6)	-	3 (0)	12 (9)
Akitsuneyama Kofun Cluster 秋常山古墳群	1 (1)	-	-	1 (1)	-	2 (2)
Nishiyama Kofun Cluster 西山古墳群	-	-	18 (13)	-	-	18 (13)
Totals	2 (2)	3 (3)	39 (33)	3(3)	15 (3)	62 (44)

== Akitsuyama Kofun Cluster ==
The Akitsuneyama site consists of two kofun. Kofun No.1 is a keyhole-shaped tumulus (zenpō-kōen-fun (前方後円墳)), and was built at the end of the early Kofun period in the 4th century AD. It has a length of 141 meters, making it the largest ancient tomb in the Hokuriku region. Kofun No.2 is a square tumulus hōfun (方墳)), and dates from the middle of the middle Kofun period. The site is located on a slight elevation above the plain of the Tedori River, within view of the Sea of Japan. The site was severely damaged by locals, who pillaged the ancient tombs for iron artifacts, which were given to the authorities to be melted down as part of the war effort.

However, Kofun No.1 was spared from pillaging despite its huge size, as it was not discovered until 1984. It was located within the grounds of the Aritsune Hachiman Shrine, and was considered a natural hill covered by a dense growth of trees. When the trees were cleared away, the kofun was found to have a three-trier structure. The bottom trier had a length of 141 meters, with a 108-meter circular portion, 67 meter wide rectangular portion and a height of 19 meters. The middle trier had a length of 121.5 meters, with a 90.5 meter circular portion, 46.5 meter wide rectangular portion and a height of 16 meters. The third trier was on the circular portion only, extending its height by 4 meters. In addition, there was a protrusion on the east side of the kofun, measuring 8 by 16 meters extending out from the second trier. The entire kofun was covered with fukiishi

The interior of the kofun has not been excavated, but the presence of a burial chamber was confirmed by ground penetrating radar, with a wooden sarcophagus exceeding 8 meters in length, with the presence of metallic grave goods. However, radar also indicated the possibly of a second burial chamber located in the vicinity of the anterior part mound top and neck.

Kofun No.2 was excavated in 2001. It had dimensions of 32.5 meters by 27 meters, with a maximum height of 5.4 meters. Much of it had been destroyed by farmers for dirt. Numerous haniwa and grave goods were excavated, including beads and fragments of swords and other metal objects.

== Gallery ==
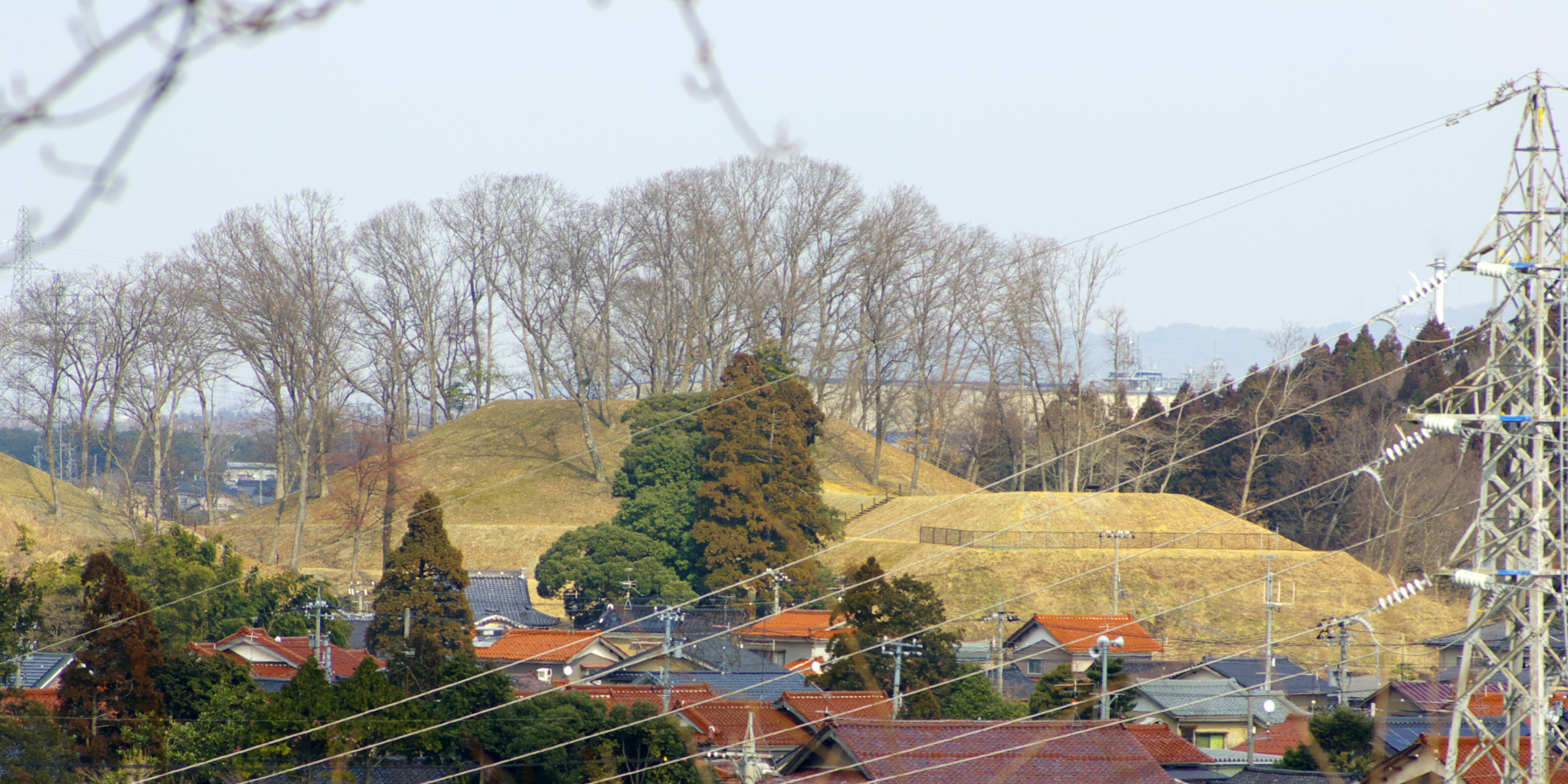
Akitsuyama from Wadayama

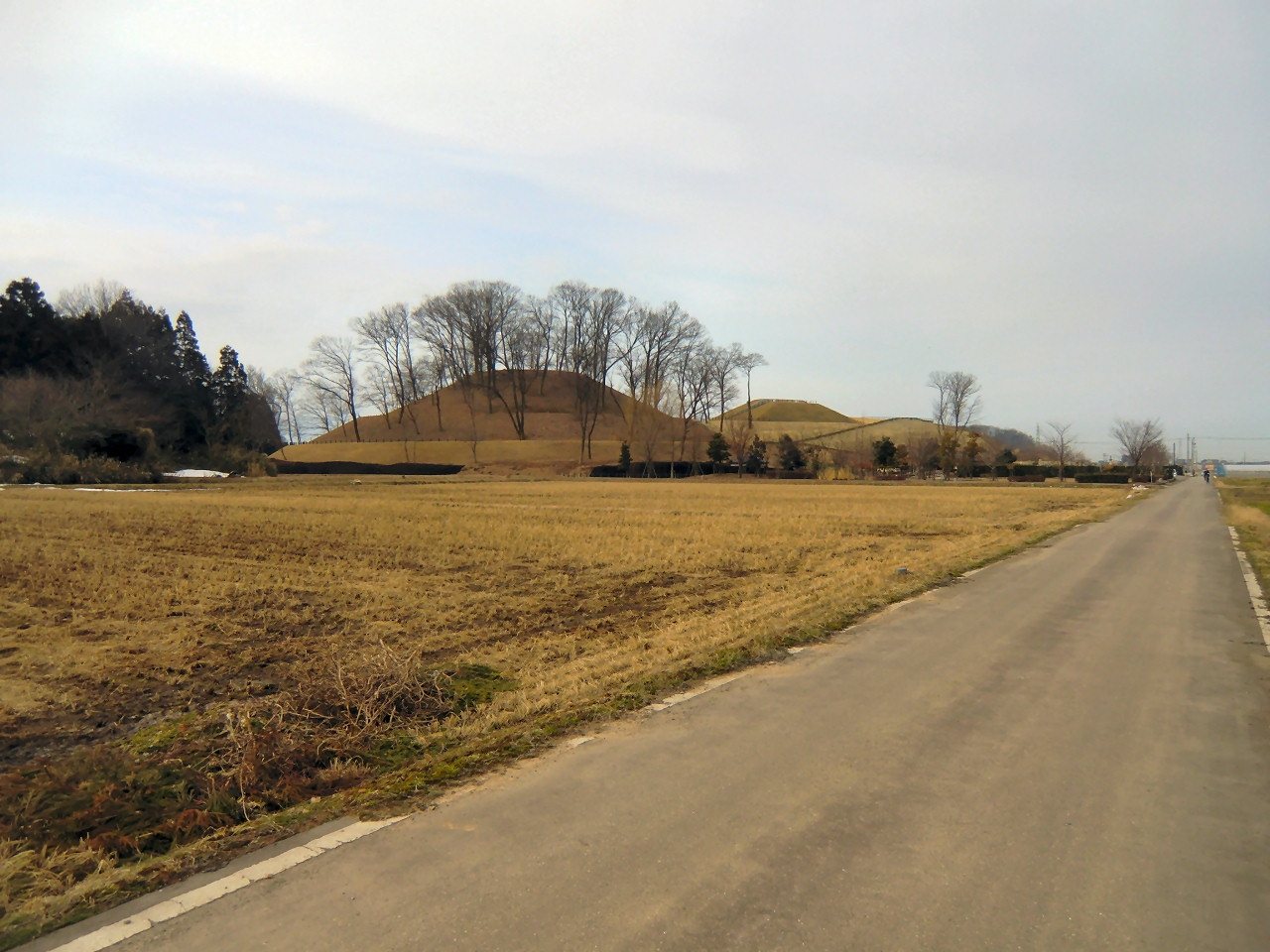
Panorama of Akitsuyama Kofun cluster

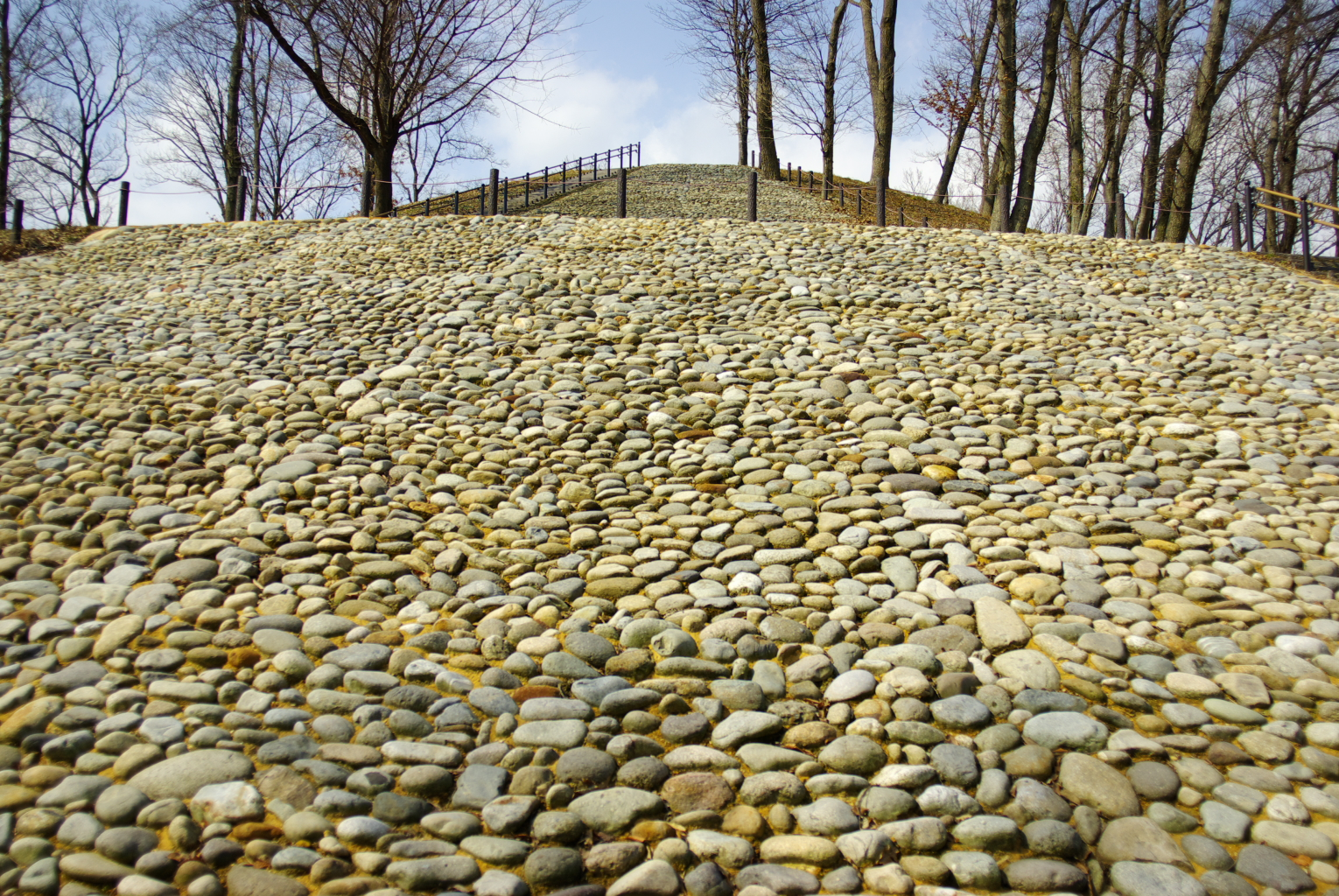
Fukiishi on Akitsuyama No.1

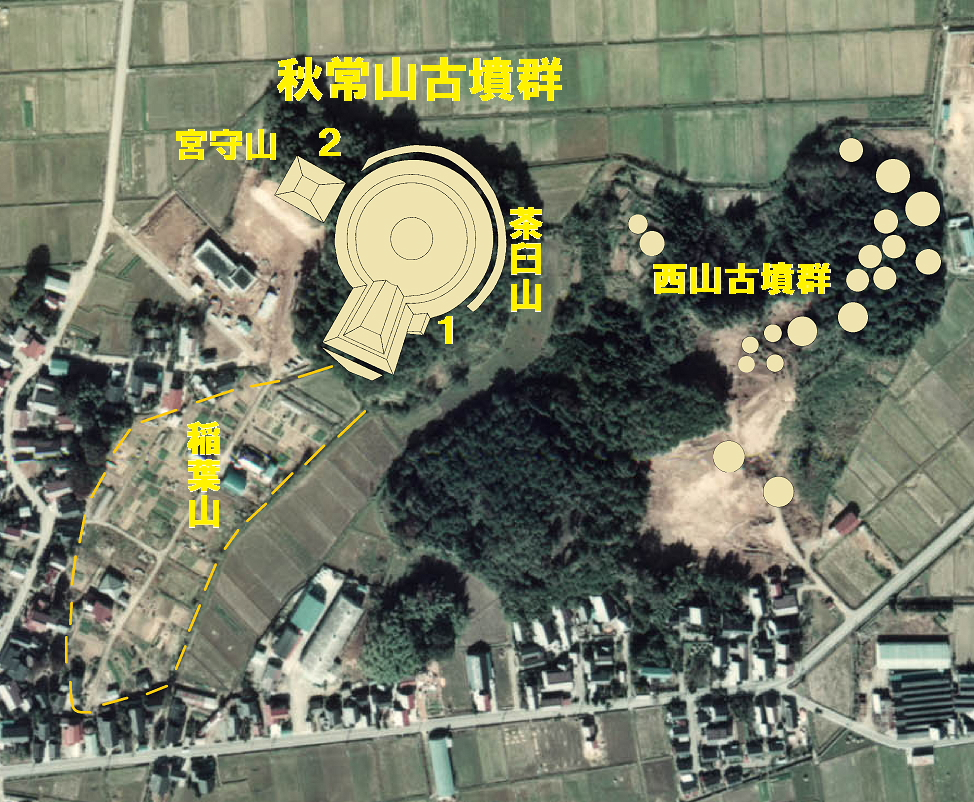
Map of Akitsuyama Site

== See also ==
- List of Historic Sites of Japan (Ishikawa)
