= Hōōzan Cave Tombs =

Japanese historic site

- 法皇山横穴古墳 (Japanese)
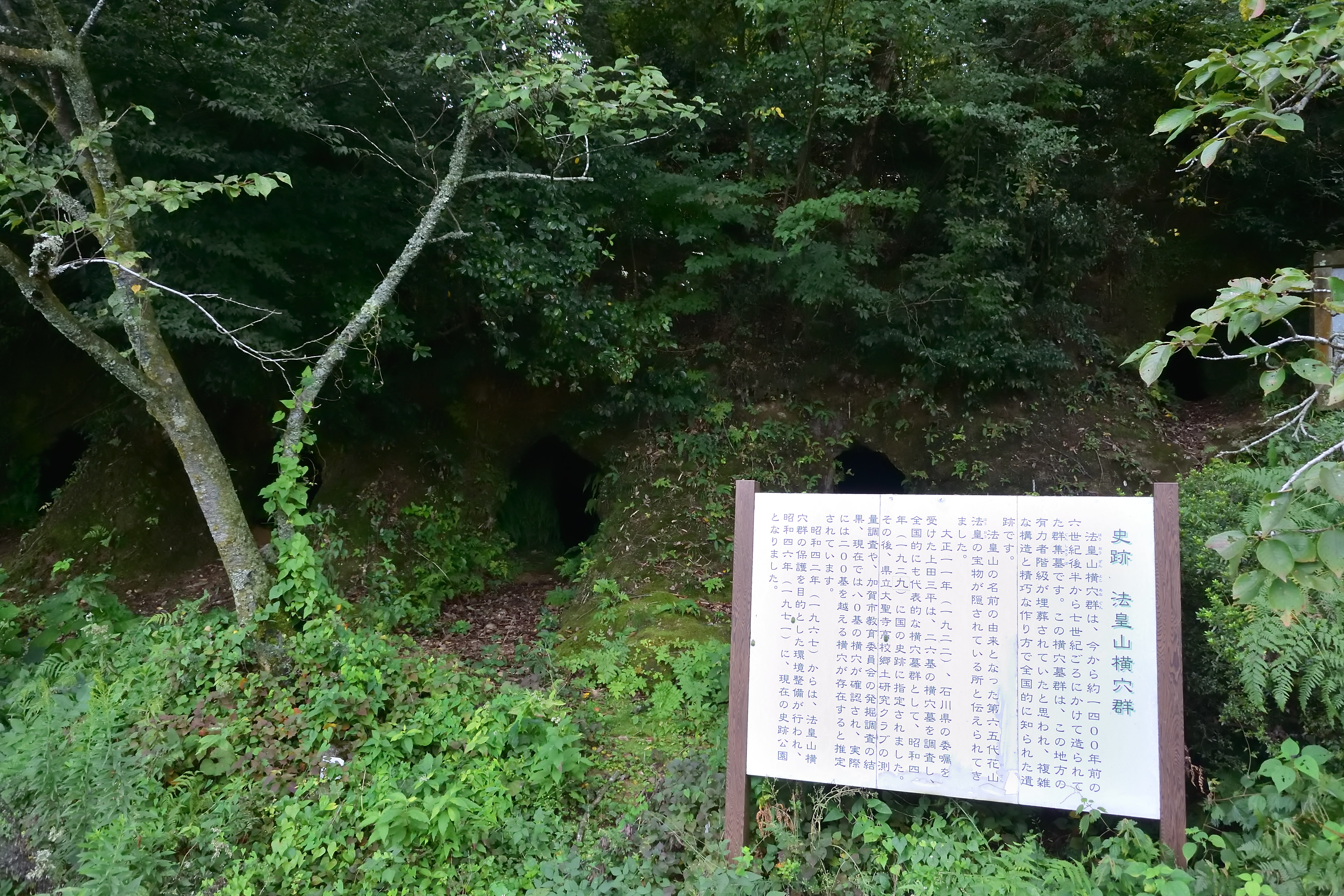
- Hōōzan Cave Tombs

- Hōōzan Cave Tombs Hōōzan Cave Tombs (Japan)
- 36°17′57″N 136°23′35″E
- Type: Kofun
- Periods: Kofun period
- Location: Kaga, Ishikawa, Japan
- Region: Hokuriku region

Site notes
- Area: 13,199.56 m^{2} (142,078.9 sq ft)
- Public access: Yes (park and museum)

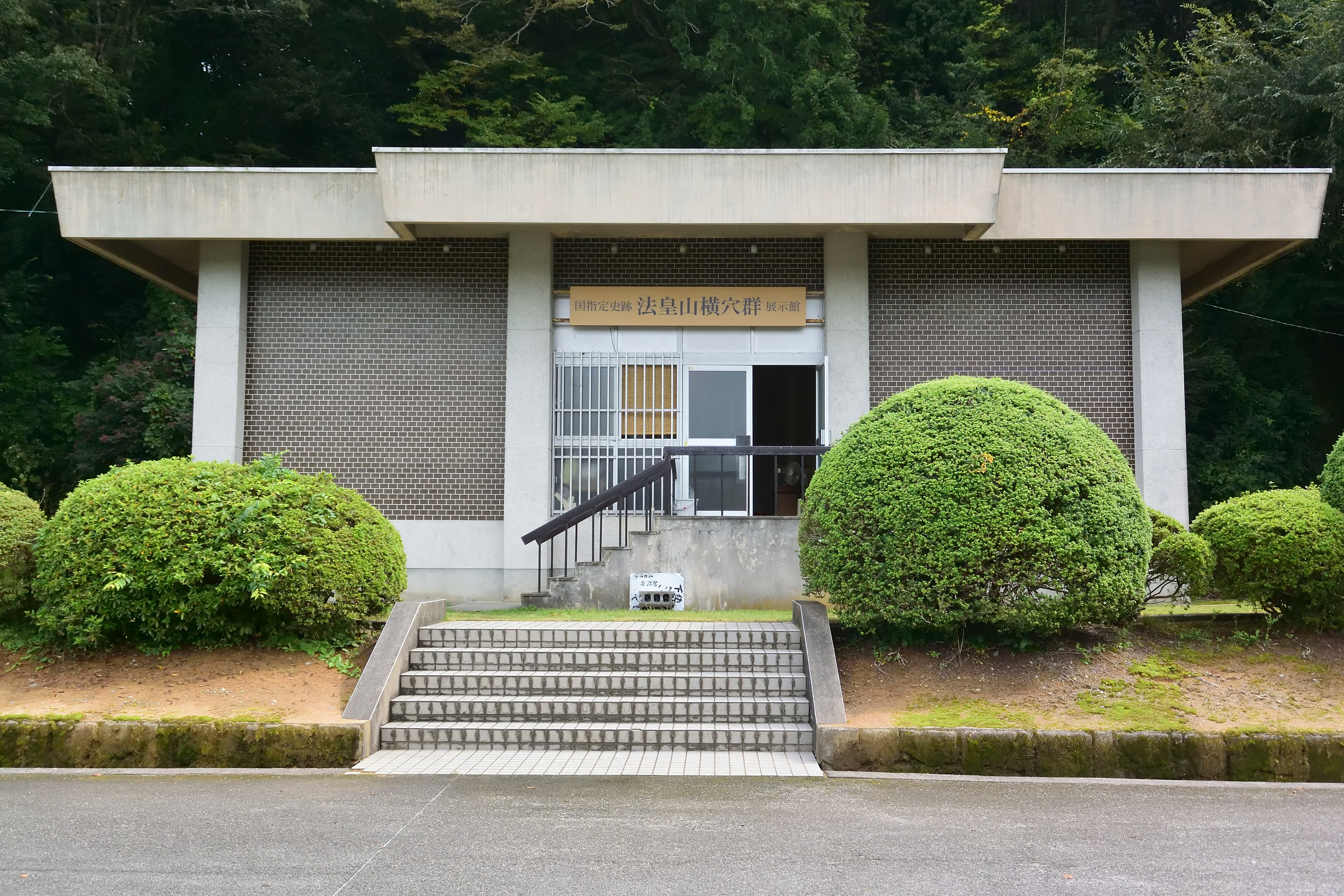
Hōōzan Yokoana Cave Tombs Exhibition Hall

The Hōōzan Cave Tombs (法皇山横穴古墳, Hōōzan Yokoana Kofun) is a group of late Kofun period yokoanabo (横穴墓), tunnel tombs in artificial caves, located in the Chokushimachi neighborhood of the city of Kaga, Ishikawa in the Hokuriku region of Japan. The site was designated a National Historic Site of Japan in 1929. It is the largest group of cave-tombs in the Hokuriku region.

== Overview ==
Hōōzan Cave Tombs are located on a tuff hill on the east bank of the Iburihashi River, with an elevation of 40 meters above the river. An archaeological excavation was conducted from 1921 to 1922, during which time 26 tombs were identified. During further excavations from 1964 through 1968, this number was expanded to 77 tombs, and the total number is now estimated to be between 150 and 200 tombs, making this one of the latest sites in the Hokuriku region, and unusual for its high density of tombs in a relatively small area. Most of the tombs have an entrance vestibule and a burial chamber, which in some cases is configured to resemble the inside of a house. The larger tombs extend up to nine meters into the hillside, with a raised platform for the sarcophagus. The smaller tombs extend only three meters. Grave goods recovered include Sue ware, Haji pottery, iron swords, and various items of jewelry. From these grave goods, it is estimated that these tombs were constructed over a 150-year period from the latter half of the 6th century to the end of the 7th century.

The name comes from a local legend that one of the tombs contains buried treasure hidden by the Heian period Emperor Kazan.

The site is maintained as a park and has a small museum, the Hōōzan Yokoana Tomb Group Exhibition Hall (法皇山横穴古墳群展示館, Hōōzan Yokoana kofun-gun tenji-kan) to display some of the artifacts found. The site is located about 10 minutes by car from Kagaonsen Station on the JR West Hokuriku Main Line.

== See also ==
- List of Historic Sites of Japan (Ishikawa)
