= Noto Kokubun-ji =

Historic religious ruin in Iskikawa, Japan

- 能登国分寺 (Japanese)
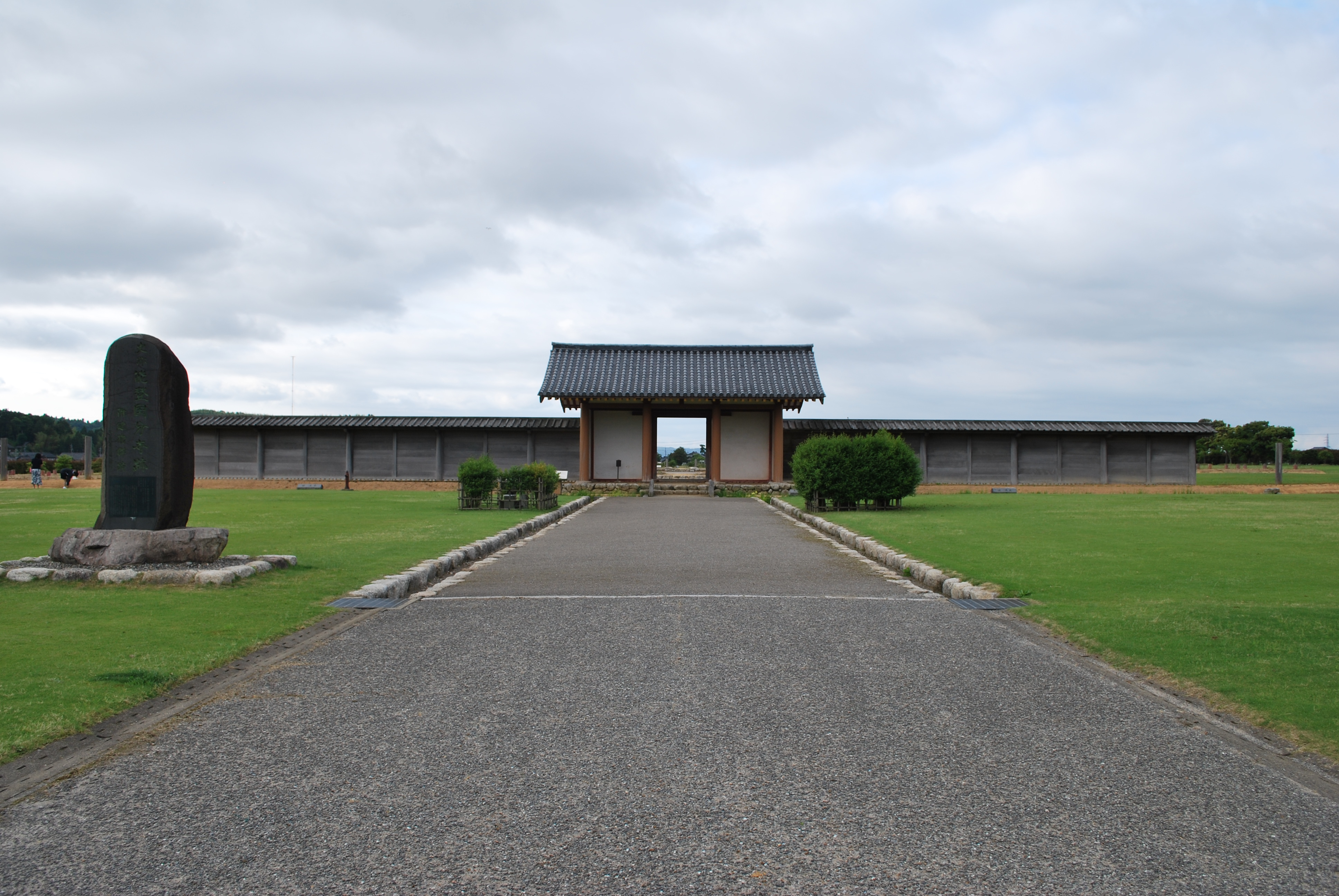
- Reconstructed gage to Noto Kokubun-ji

- Location within Ishikawa Prefecture Location within Japan
- 37°1′30.0″N 136°57′27″E
- Type: Buddhist temple ruins
- Location: Nanao, Ishikawa, Japan

History
- Founder: Emperor Shōmu
- Built: 843 AD
- National Historic Site of Japan

The Noto Kokubun-ji (能登国分寺) was a Buddhist temple located in what is now the city of Nanao, Ishikawa, Japan. It was one of the provincial temples per the system established by Emperor Shōmu during the Nara period (710 – 794) for the purpose of promoting Buddhism as the national religion of Japan and standardising imperial rule over the provinces. The temple no longer exists, but the temple grounds were designated as a National Historic Site in 1974.

== Overview ==
The Shoku Nihongi records that in 741 AD, as the country recovered from a major smallpox epidemic, Emperor Shōmu ordered that a state-subsidized monastery and nunnery be established in every province for the promotion of Buddhism and to enhance political unification per the new ritsuryō system. These were the kokubunji (国分寺). The temples were constructed per a more-or-less standardized template, and were each to be staffed by twenty clerics who would pray for the state's protection. The associated provincial nunneries (kokubunniji) were on a smaller scale, each housing ten nuns to pray for the atonement of sins. This system declined when the capital was moved from Nara to Kyoto in 794 AD.

== History ==
The Noto Kokubun-ji temple site is located on the east coast of Noto Peninsula in a paddy field about 2.5 kilometers south of Nanao city of the coast facing Nanao Bay. The name of the neighbourhood is "Kokubu", indicating that the now-vanished provincial capital of Noto Province was located in the close vicinity. As the result of an archaeological excavation conducted over three years from 1954, traces of the Lecture Hall, Pagoda, middle gate, south gate, cloister, etc. were detected as well as the foundations of the Kondō. The temple compound was 209 meters north-to-south by 184 meters east-to-west and the layout of the buildings mirrored that of the temple of Hokki-ji in Ikaruga, Nara.

The temple is believed to have been constructed in the late Hakuho period as Daikō-ji (大興寺), a family temple for the Noto-no-omi clan, the local rulers of Noto Province. It was elevated to provincial temple status only in 843 AD, over a century after the creation of the provincial temple system by Emperor Shōmu. One of the reasons for this delay was due to the history of Noto Province. Noto was created out of four districts of Echizen Province in 718, but was abolished and merged with Etchū Province in 741, only to be reestablished in 757, after which it virtually disappears from history for two centuries. The Noto Kokubun-ji burned down after its pagoda caught fire due to lightning in 883. It reappeared briefly in 1532, when records indicate that Hatakeyama Yoshifusa, lord of Nanao Castle made a donation of one koku of rice to the temple, but it disappeared from the historical record again soon thereafter.

The site is now an archaeological park, where visitors can see the foundations of the Nara-period buildings, and with reconstructions of some of the gates and walls of the temple complex and a small museum, the Noto kokubunji tenji-kan (能登国分寺展示館). The temple site is about seven minutes by car from Nanao Station on the JR West Nanao Line.

== See also ==
- List of Historic Sites of Japan (Ishikawa)
- provincial temple
