= Tatsumi Canal =

Canal in Kanazawa, Japan

- 辰巳用水 (Japanese)
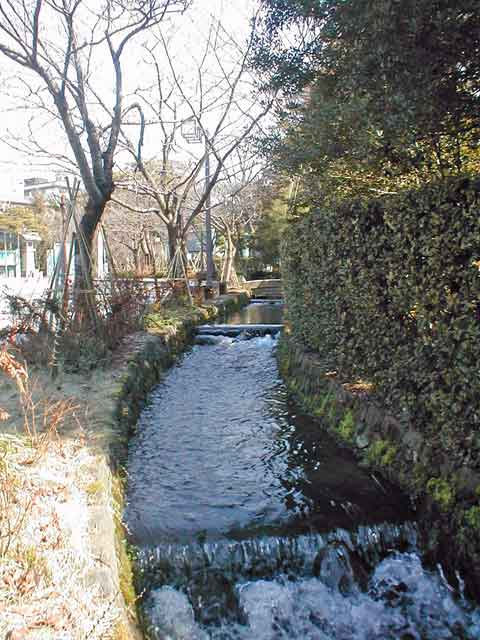
- Tatsumi Canal

- Tatsumi Canal Tatsumi Canal (Japan)
- 36°33′33″N 136°39′59″E
- Periods: Edo period
- Location: Kanazawa, Ishikawa, Japan
- Region: Hokuriku region

Site notes
- Public access: Yes

The Tatsumi Canal (辰巳用水, Tatsumi yōsui) is an 11 kilometer long canal built in the Edo period in the city of Kanazawa, Ishikawa Japan. A 8.7 kilometer portion of this canal was designated a National Historic Site of Japan in 2010.

== Overview ==
The Tatsumi Canal was completed in 1632 by the third daimyō of Kanazawa Domain, Maeda Toshitsune. After the Kanazawa Great Fire of 1631 destroyed the jōkamachi and most of Kanazawa Castle, he ordered the construction of a canal for the purpose of fire protection and to provide water for the Kenrokuen gardens and moats of Kanazawa Castle. Water was diverted at Kamitatsumi upstream of the Sai River, and to the Kodatsuno plateau via a water tunnel of about 4 kilometers and the use of an inverse siphon to bring water against an uphill gradient. The Tatsumi canal proper then extended for 11 kilometers. En route, it was also used for irrigation purposes.

Despite the long distance and technical difficulties in building the canal, it was completed in less than a year. At that time, a wooden trough was buried to guide water to Kanazawa Castle. This was later replaced with a stone pipe with an average width of about 1.7 meters and a height of 2 to 2.6 meters. The canal inlet was extended another 600 meters in 1855. The canal is regarded as a valuable artifact of civil engineering technology during the Edo period, and the 8.7 kilometer portion covered by the National Historic Site designation in 2010 is centered on the upper and middle reaches. This portion is about 30 minutes by car from Kanazawa Station on the JR West Hokuriku Main Line.

== See also ==
- List of Historic Sites of Japan (Ishikawa)
