= Kanazawa Castle =

Castle in Kanazawa, Ishikawa, Japan

Kanazawa Castle 金沢城
- Kanazawa, Ishikawa Prefecture, Japan
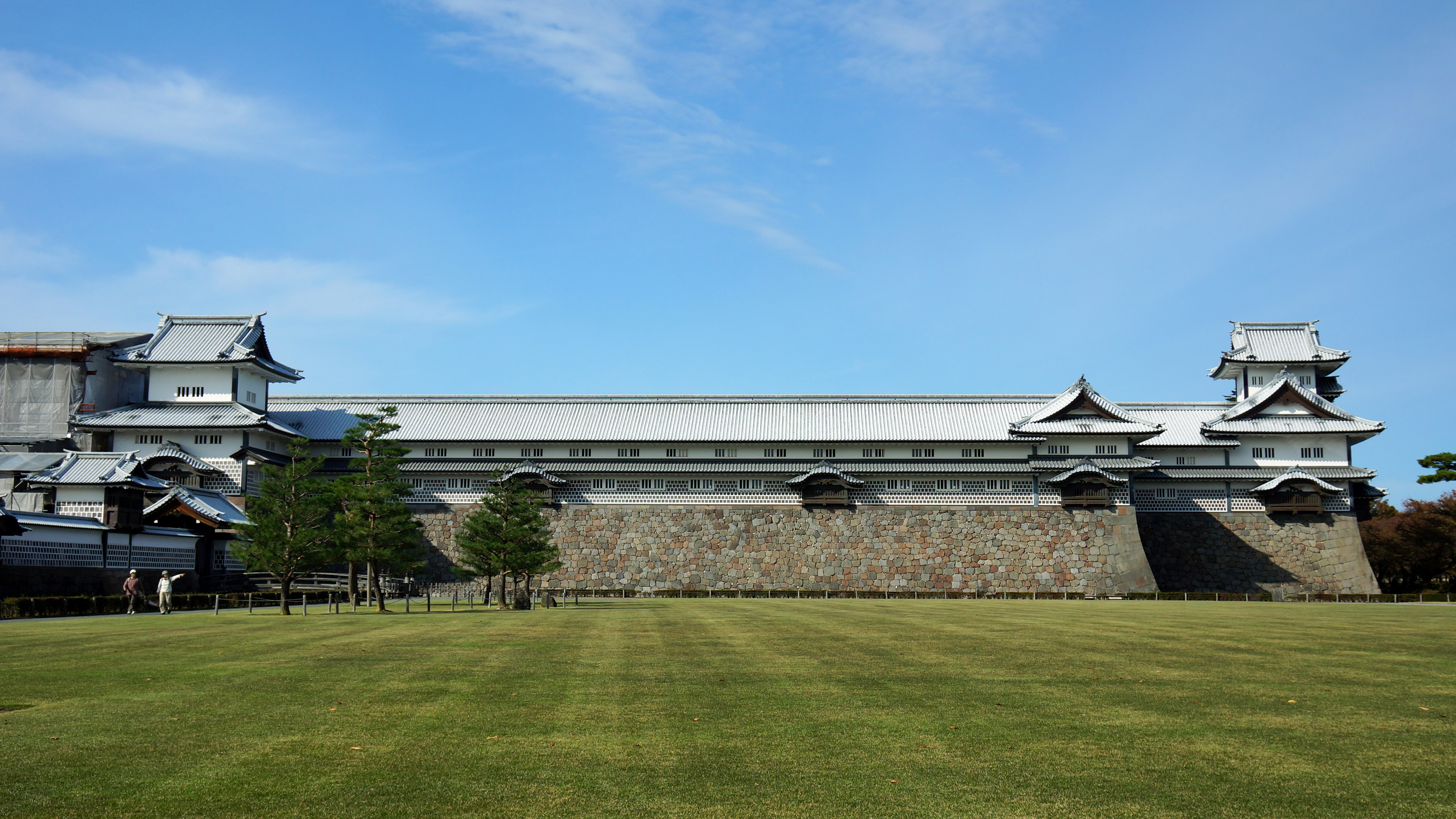
- Nagaya and yagura

Site information
- Type: Flatland-style Japanese castle
- Condition: partially reconstructed

Site history
- Built by: Sakuma Morimasa
- In use: 1580-1945

Kanazawa Castle (金沢城, Kanazawa-jō) is a large, partially restored Japanese castle in Kanazawa, Ishikawa, Japan. It is located adjacent to the celebrated Kenroku-en Garden, which once formed the castle's private outer garden. It was the headquarters of Kaga Domain, ruled by the Maeda clan for 14 generations from the Sengoku period until the coming of the Meiji Restoration in 1871.

== History ==
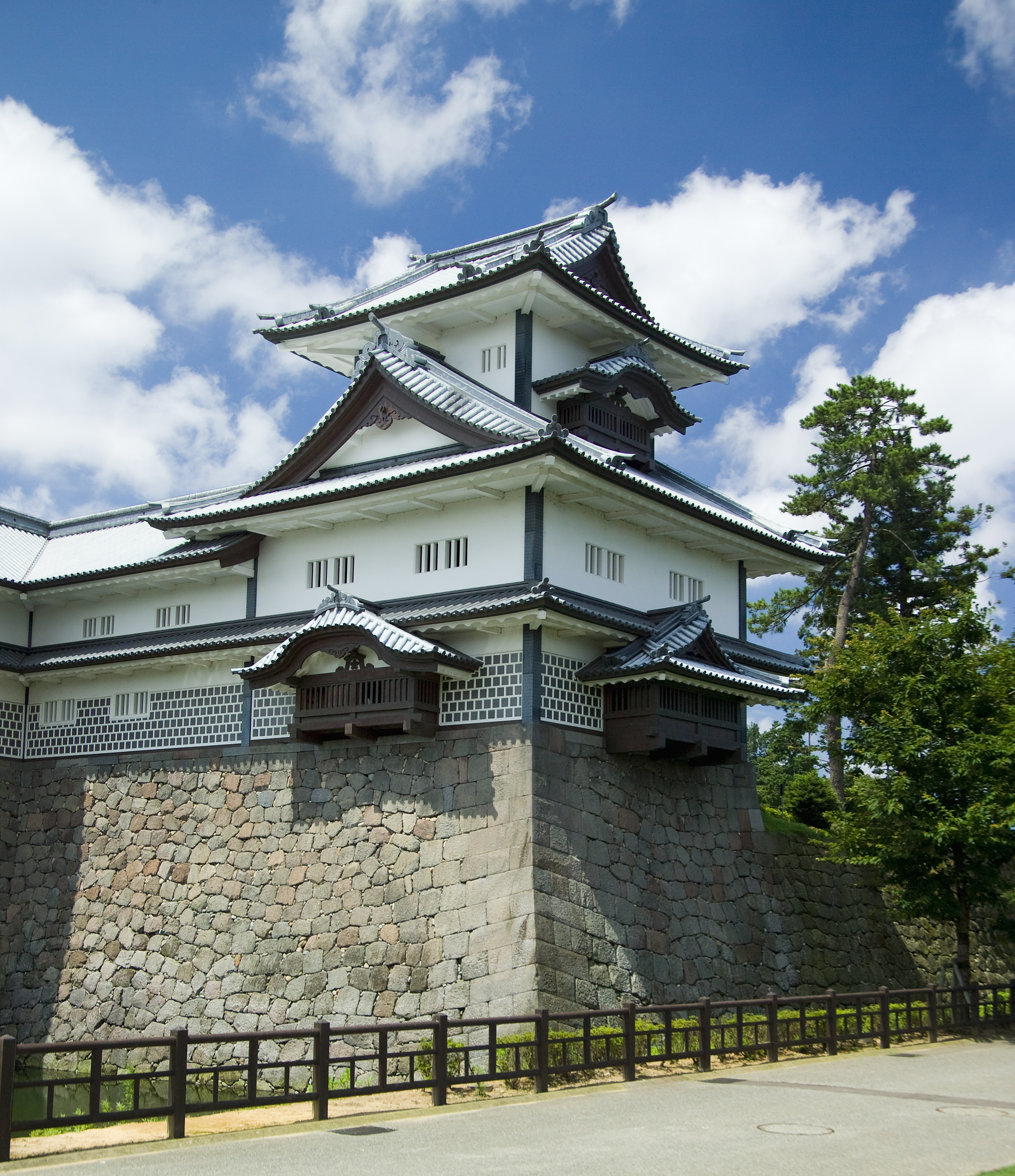
Kanazawa Castle showing the Hashizume-mon Tsuzuki Yagura watchtower, Hashizume-ichi-no-mon Gate, and moat

During the late Muromachi period, the Ikkō-ikki, followers of the teachings of priest Rennyo, of the Jōdo Shinshū sect, displaced the official governors of Kaga Province, the Togashi clan, and established a kind of theocratic republic later known as "The Peasants' Kingdom". Their principal stronghold was the Kanazawa Gobō, a fortified temple complex on the tip of the Kodatsuno Ridge. Backed by high hills and flanked on two sides by rivers, it was a natural fortress, around which a castle town developed. This was the start of what would become the city of Kanazawa. In 1580, Oda Nobunaga sent his general Sakuma Morimasa to conquer Kaga Province. He was subsequently awarded with the province as his fief and started work on the moats and the layout of the surrounding castle town; however, he sided with Shibata Katsuie after the assassination of Nobunaga and was defeated by the forces of Toyotomi Hideyoshi, led by Maeda Toshiie in the Battle of Shizugatake of 1583.

Maeda Toshiie made Kanazawa the base of his holdings, which expanded to cover all of Kaga Province, Noto Province and Etchū Province as Kaga Domain under the Tokugawa shogunate. He ordered the castle completely reconstructed in 1592 after lessons learned during Japanese invasions of Korea, and invited Takayama Ukon, the Kirishitan daimyō known for his expertise in castle design to assist with the construction.

The new castle originally had a six-story tenshu, which burned down in 1602 and was never rebuilt. Instead, the Inner bailey was used for the Hon-maru palace, or residence of the Maeda clan, with a three-story yagura turret.

The castle burned down in 1631, and was modified extensively at that time. The Ni-no-maru Second Bailey was expanded, the Tatsumi Canal was built through the castle grounds, and the residences of various senior retainers were removed to outside the castle moats. The castle burned down again in the Great Kanazawa Fire 1759.

Following the Meiji restoration, the castle site was turned over to the Imperial Japanese Army in 1871 and served as headquarters of its 9th Division. Most of the surviving structures in the Ni-no-maru enclosure were destroyed in a fire in 1881.

From 1949 to 1989, a portion of the castle site was turned over to Kanazawa University.

The castle was designated a National Historic Site in 2008.

Most of the current buildings are reconstructions based how the castle looked in the 1850s. Surviving structures include the Ishikawa Gate (built in 1788), the Sanjukken Nagaya and the Tsurumaru Storehouse all of which are designed Important Cultural Properties. The Hishi Yagura turret, Gojikken Nagaya warehouse, and Hashizume-mon Tsuzuki Yagura turret were restored in 2001 using traditional construction methods. Several gates of the castle have also been reconstructed, the main entrance to the castle Kahoku-mon Gate in 2010, the Hashizume-mon Gate in 2015, and the Nezumitamon Gate and Nezumitamon Bridge in 2020.

The groundbreaking ceremony for Ninomaru Palace, the final stage of the restoration of Kanazawa Castle, known as the "Heisei Castle Construction," took place on March 9, 2025. According to the Hokuriku Shimbun, Ninomaru Palace was the largest building in the castle and served as the administrative center of the Kaga Domain. Ishikawa Prefecture plans to gradually restore the "Omote-muki" (reception hall) where the domain lord conducted government affairs over several years.

== Architecture ==
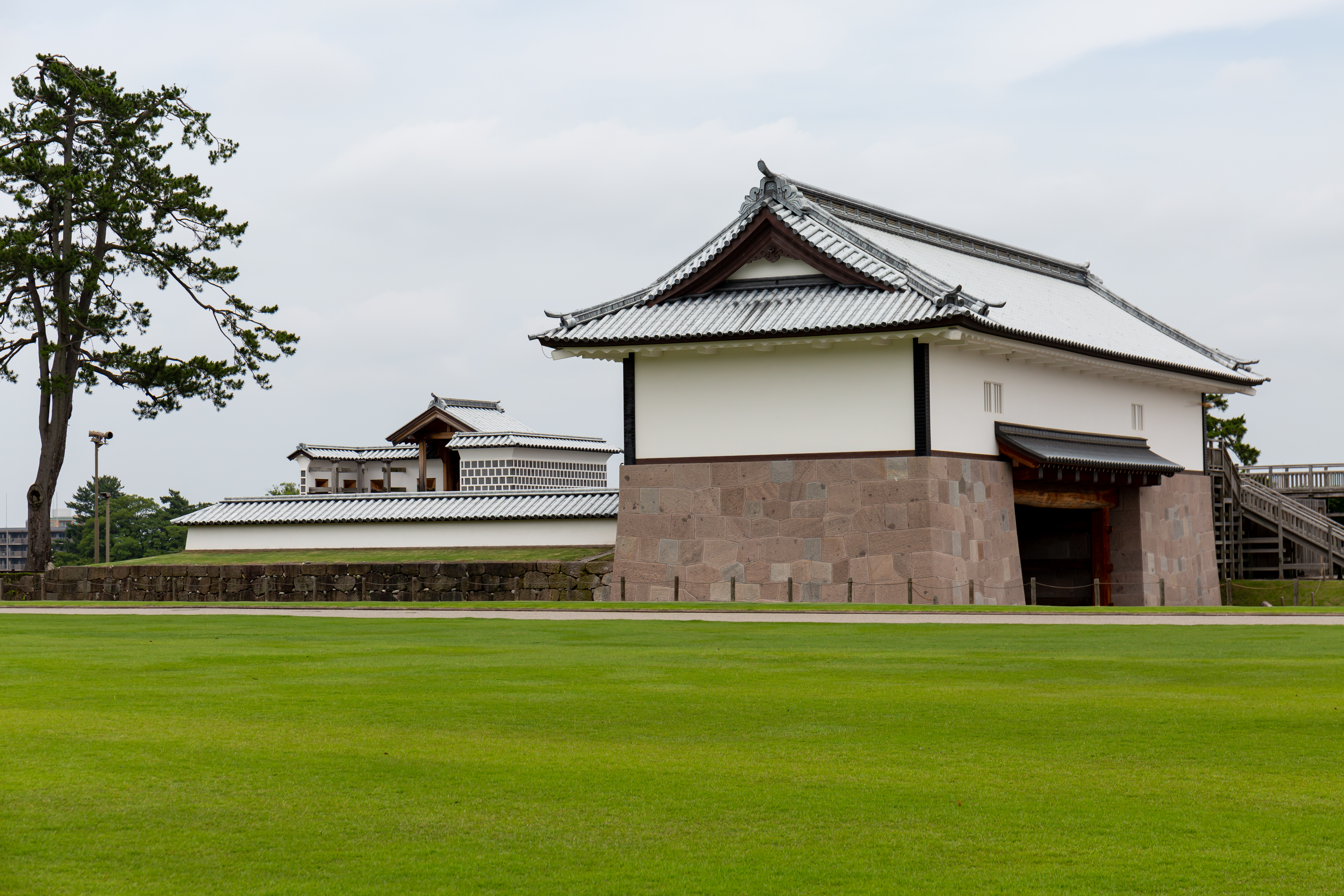
Kanazawa Castle gate

Although the Maeda clan were the most powerful daimyō in Japan after the ruling Tokugawa clan in terms of kokudaka, their position was not unassailable. Kanazawa Castle is located at the center of a castle town, which in itself consisted of numerous features which added to the overall defensive situation. The castle is built on the highest ground between the Sai and Asano rivers. A system of moats and canals surround the castle for extra protection. Maeda Toshinaga, the second daimyō of Kaga Domain, built a system of inner moats that total over 3,000 metres (9,800 ft) in length, and another system of outer moats was added between 1600 and 1614. To supply drinking water, a series of canals, built from 1583-1630, connected to the moat system. In total, the system was nearly 15 kilometres (9.3 mi) long.

For further protection, the castle grounds were split into nine enclosures divided with earthen ramparts, stone walls and fortified gates, surrounding the main bailey where the Maeda clan had their residence. Buildings relating to the government of Kaga Domain were mostly in the Second Bailey (Ni-no-maru) In many Japanese castle towns, Buddhist temples were deliberately placed in locations selected to reinforce weak points in castle defenses. Kanazawa was no exception: temples were strategically grouped in areas some distance from the castle, most likely as retreat havens.

The castle's distinctive, whitish roof tiles are made of lead. The reason for that is not only that they are fireproof, but legend says that also that in times of siege, the tiles could be melted down and cast into bullets.

=== Main features ===
The castle illuminated at night, seen from the Ishikawa Bridge

The castle's main features are as follows:

- Hishi Yagura - watchtower, three stories. Height of roof: 17.34 metres (56.9 ft) above stone wall; total floor area: 255.35 square metres (2,748.6 sq ft). This tower is built at a slight angle to the rest of the structures, which results in diamond-shaped internal pillars and hard-to-build connections within its complex web of internal pillars and beams.

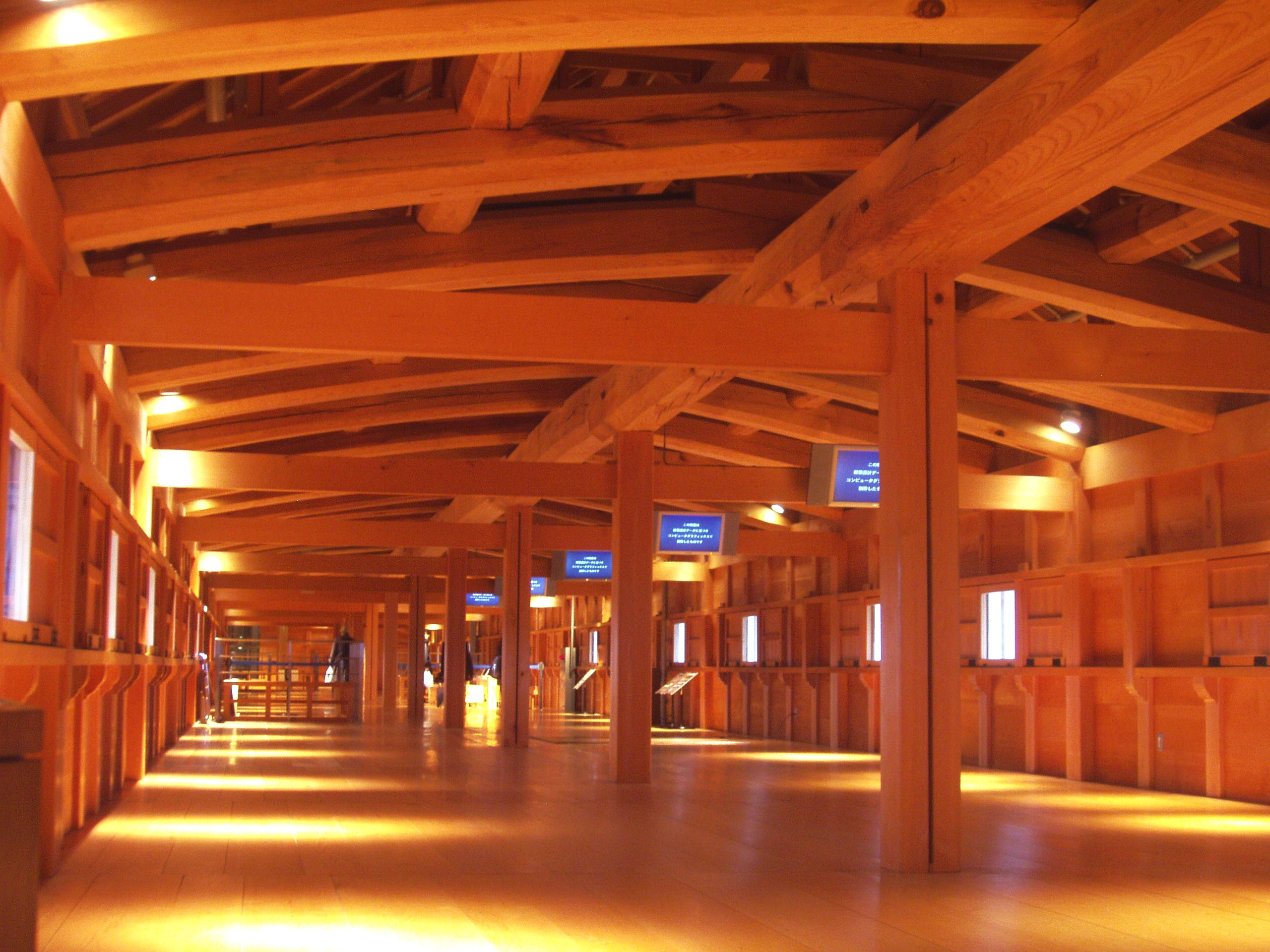
Interior (Gojukken Nagaya), reconstructed 2001

- Gojikken Nagaya - long, hall-like, multi-sided turret normally used as a warehouse, two stories. Height of roof: 9.35 to 10.08 metres (30.7 to 33.1 ft) above stone wall; total floor area: 1,384.95 square metres (14,907.5 sq ft).
- Hashizume-mon Tsuzuki Yagura - watchtower and command post, three stories. Height of roof: 14.69 metres (48.2 ft) above stone wall; total floor area: 253.93 square metres (2,733.3 sq ft).
- Hashizume-mon Gate - masugata gate complex with an entrance gate, a gatehouse and an enclosure of earthen walls.
- Tsuru-no-maru Dobei - double earthen wall. Height of roof: 2.91 metres (9.5 ft) above stone wall.
- Ishikawa-mon Gate - entrance gate complex with two distinctive styles of stonework. It comprises eight separate structures that have all designated National Important Cultural Properties. This gate complex faces one of the entrances of Kenrokuen park.

The castle sits within extensive grounds, currently organized as large, well-kept lawns and informal wooded areas, with various large walls, gates, and outbuildings.

== See also ==
- Toyokuni Shrine, a Shinto shrine located on Mount Utatsu which is dedicated to Toyotomi Hideyoshi and Maeda Toshitsune
- List of Historic Sites of Japan (Ishikawa)

== Literature ==
- Benesch, Oleg and Ran Zwigenberg (2019). Japan's Castles: Citadels of Modernity in War and Peace. Cambridge: Cambridge University Press. p. 374. ISBN 9781108481946.
- De Lange, William (2021). An Encyclopedia of Japanese Castles. Groningen: Toyo Press. pp. 600 pages. ISBN 978-9492722300.
- Mitchelhill, Jennifer (2013). Castles of the Samurai:Power & Beauty. US: Kodansha. ISBN 978-1568365121.
- Schmorleitz, Morton S. (1974). Castles in Japan. Tokyo: Charles E. Tuttle Co. pp. 121–123. ISBN 0-8048-1102-4.
- Motoo, Hinago (1986). Japanese Castles. Tokyo: Kodansha. p. 200 pages. ISBN 0-87011-766-1.
- Schmorleitz, Morton S. (1974). Castles in Japan. Tokyo: Charles E. Tuttle Co. pp. 144–145. ISBN 0-8048-1102-4.
- Turnbull, Stephen (2003). Japanese Castles 1540-1640. Osprey Publishing. p. 64 pages. ISBN 1-84176-429-9.
