= Ishikawa Prefectural History Museum =

- 石川県立歴史博物館
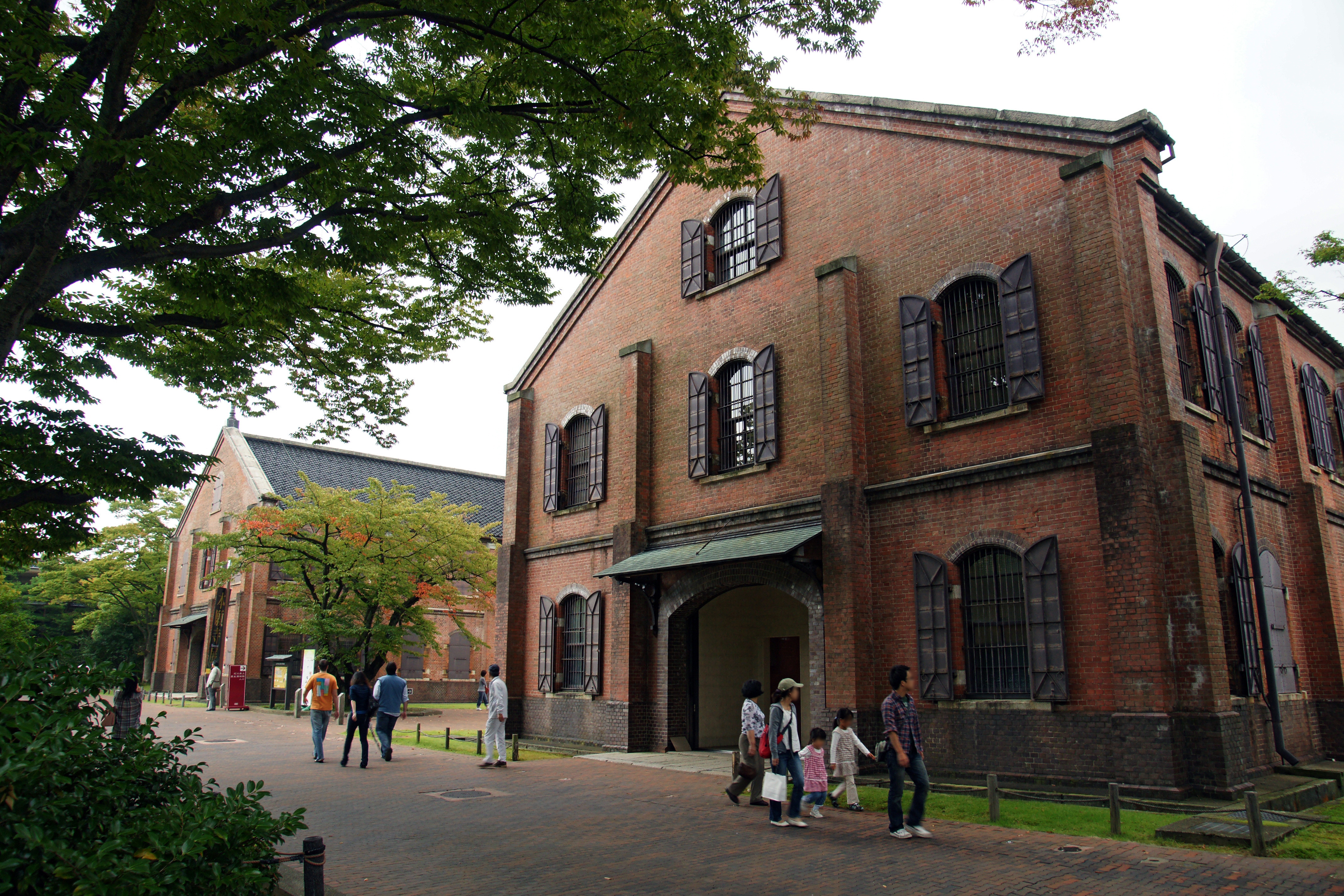
- Interactive map of the Ishikawa Prefectural History Museum area

General information
- Location: 3-1 Dewa-machi, Kanazawa, Ishikawa Prefecture, Japan
- Coordinates: 36°33′31″N 136°39′46″E
- Opened: 25 October 1986

Website
- homepage (jp)

Ishikawa Prefectural History Museum (石川県立歴史博物館, Ishikawa Kenritsu Rekishi Hakubutsukan) is a prefectural museum in Kanazawa, Japan, dedicated to the history and culture of Ishikawa Prefecture. The three ICP red brick buildings date to 1909-14 and functioned first as the local arsenal, then after the Pacific War as the Kanazawa College of Art, before being converted into a museum in 1986.

== See also ==
- List of Historic Sites of Japan (Ishikawa)
- Kaga Province
- Noto Province
- Ishikawa Prefectural Museum of Art
