= Chikamori Site =

Archaeological site in Kanazawa, Japan

- チカモリ遺跡 (Japanese)
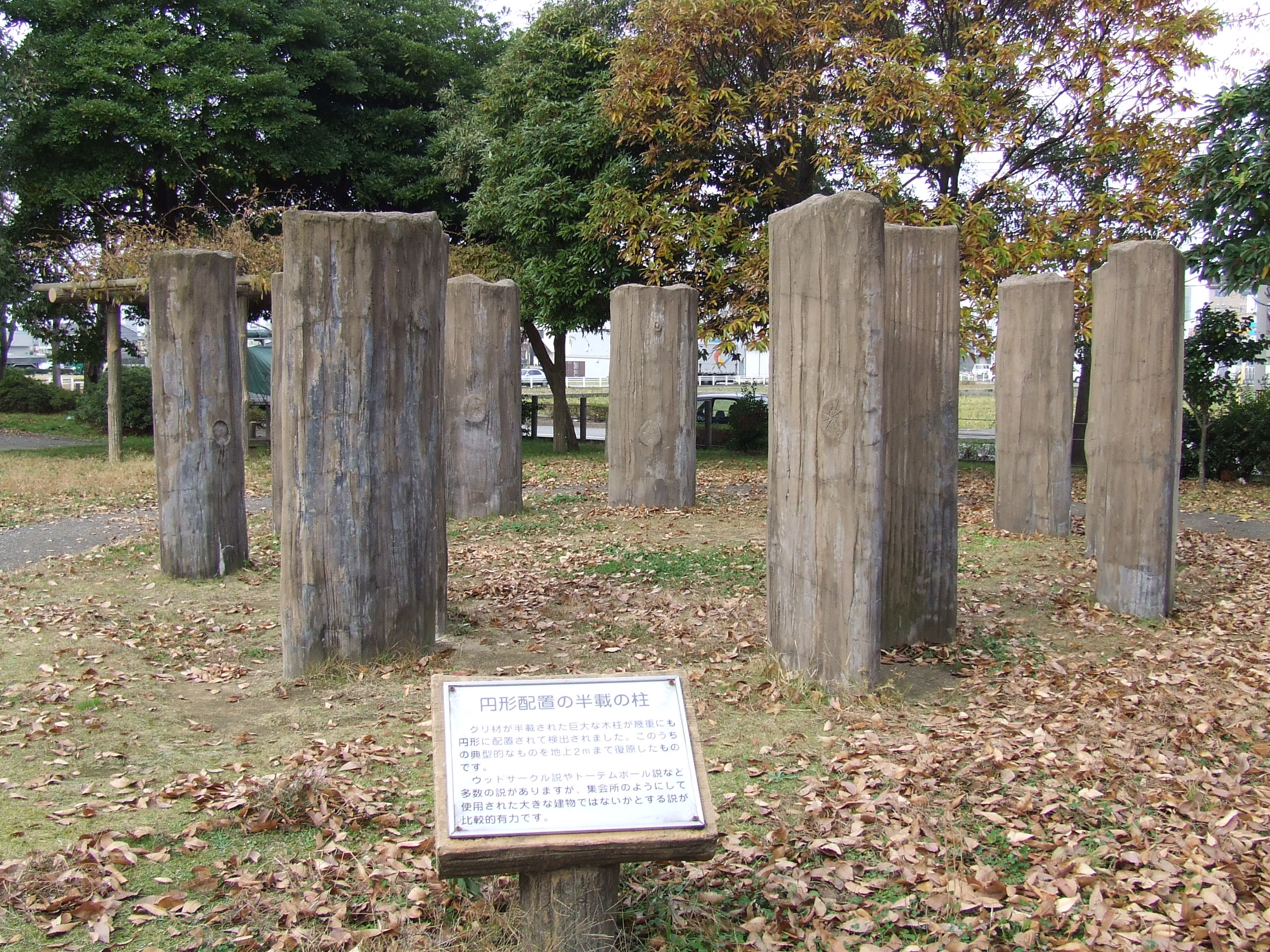
- Wooden pillars at Chikamori Site

- Chikamori Site Chikamori Site (Japan)
- 36°33′22.1″N 136°36′16.8″E
- Type: settlement
- Periods: Jōmon period
- Location: Kanazawa, Ishikawa, Japan
- Region: Hokuriku region

Site notes
- Area: 4,456.17 m^{2} (47,965.8 sq ft)
- Public access: Yes (Park, Museum)

The Chikamori Site (チカモリ遺跡, Chikamori iseki) is an archaeological site with the ruins of a late Jōmon period settlement in what is now the Shinbohon neighbourhood of the city of Kanazawa, Ishikawa in the Hokuriku region of Japan. It was designated a National Historic Site of Japan in 1987.

== Overview ==
The Chikamori Site is located in the river delta of the Sai River, with abundant underground water. Excavation surveys have been conducted several times since 1954, and it was presumed to be a ring-shaped settlement with a plaza in the center. Artifacts included a large amount of Jōmon pottery, stone tools, lacquer products and seeds. However, during the 1980 survey a ring of wooden columns forming a timber circle was discovered in conjunction with a land development project. In the subsequent survey, a total of 347 foundations of large pillars with a diameter of 30 to 85 centimetres arranged in timber circles were found. Many of these wooden pillars are divided vertically into halves, and the cross-section U-shaped. Of these wooden pillars, 23 gigantic pillars with a diameter of 50 centimeters or more are grouped in the vicinity of the central square in groups of eight to ten sets, regularly arranged in a circle with a diameter of 6 to 8 meters. The pillars were made of chestnut wood.

The foundations indicate that the structures were of three types: circular, square, and rectangular, and were located close together or even overlapping. Since only the pillar roots remain, the original height of the structures is unknown, as was their function or purpose, or even if these pillars were free-standing, forming a "Japanese Wood Henge" or were the supports for raised buildings. However, it can be inferred from the thickness of the pillars that these were not the foundations of ordinary residences, and may have been some form of religious facility. While the foundations of wooden foundation pillars is often found in Jōmon period ruins, the great number and large size of these pillars at this site is unusual.

The site is now an archaeological park with wooden pillars restored to a height of 2 meters erected in a ring, recreating the situation at that time. In the Kanazawa City Buried Cultural Property Collection (金沢市埋蔵文化財収蔵庫, Kanazawa-shi maizō bunkazai shūzō-ko), which is adjacent to the site, relics excavated from various archaeological sites in the city, including the Chikamori site, are displayed. In addition, in the permanent exhibition room of Kanazawa Jōmon World, a circular wooden pillar row has been restored indoors. The site is about ten minutes by car from the Kanazawa Nishi Interchange on the Hokuriku Expressway.

== See also ==
- List of Historic Sites of Japan (Ishikawa)
