= List of places of scenic beauty of Japan (Toyama) =

This list is of the places of scenic beauty of Japan located within the Prefecture of Toyama.

== National Places of Scenic Beauty ==
As of 1 August 2014, two Places have been designated at a national level (including one *Special Place of Scenic Beauty); Landscape of Oku no Hosomichi is a serial designation spanning ten prefectures.

Site	Municipality	Comments	Image	Coordinates	Type	Ref.
*Kurobe Valley 黒部峡谷附猿飛並びに奥鐘山; Kurobe-kyōkoku tsuketari Sarutobi narabini Okukane-yama	Tateyama/Kurobe	also a Special Natural Monument		36°36′15″N 137°40′35″E	6	
Shōmyō Falls 称名滝; Shōmyō-taki	Tateyama			36°34′33″N 137°31′36″E	6	
Landscape of Oku no Hosomichi - Arisoumi (Onna-iwa) おくのほそ道の風景地 有磯海(女岩); Oku no Hosomichi no fūkei-chi Ariso-umi Onna-iwa	Takaoka	designation spans ten prefectures		36°48′52″N 137°02′43″E		

== Prefectural Places of Scenic Beauty ==
As of 1 May 2014, three sites have been designated at a prefectural level.

Site	Municipality	Comments	Image	Coordinates	Type	Ref.
Shōmyō Falls and Basin 称名滝とその流域; Shōmyō-taki to sono ryūiki	Tateyama	also a Prefectural Historic Site and Natural Monument		36°34′33″N 137°31′36″E		
Kōkyū-ji Tea Garden 光久寺の茶庭; Kōkyūji no chatei	Himi			36°48′45″N 136°57′23″E		
Abugashima and Surroundings 虻が島とその周辺; Abugashima to sono shūhen	Himi			36°55′55″N 137°02′27″E		

== Municipal Places of Scenic Beauty ==
As of 1 May 2014, twenty-one sites have been designated at a municipal level.

== See also ==
- Cultural Properties of Japan
- List of Historic Sites of Japan (Toyama)
- List of parks and gardens of Toyama Prefecture
