= Kitadai Site =

Archaeological site in Japan

- 北代遺跡 (Japanese)
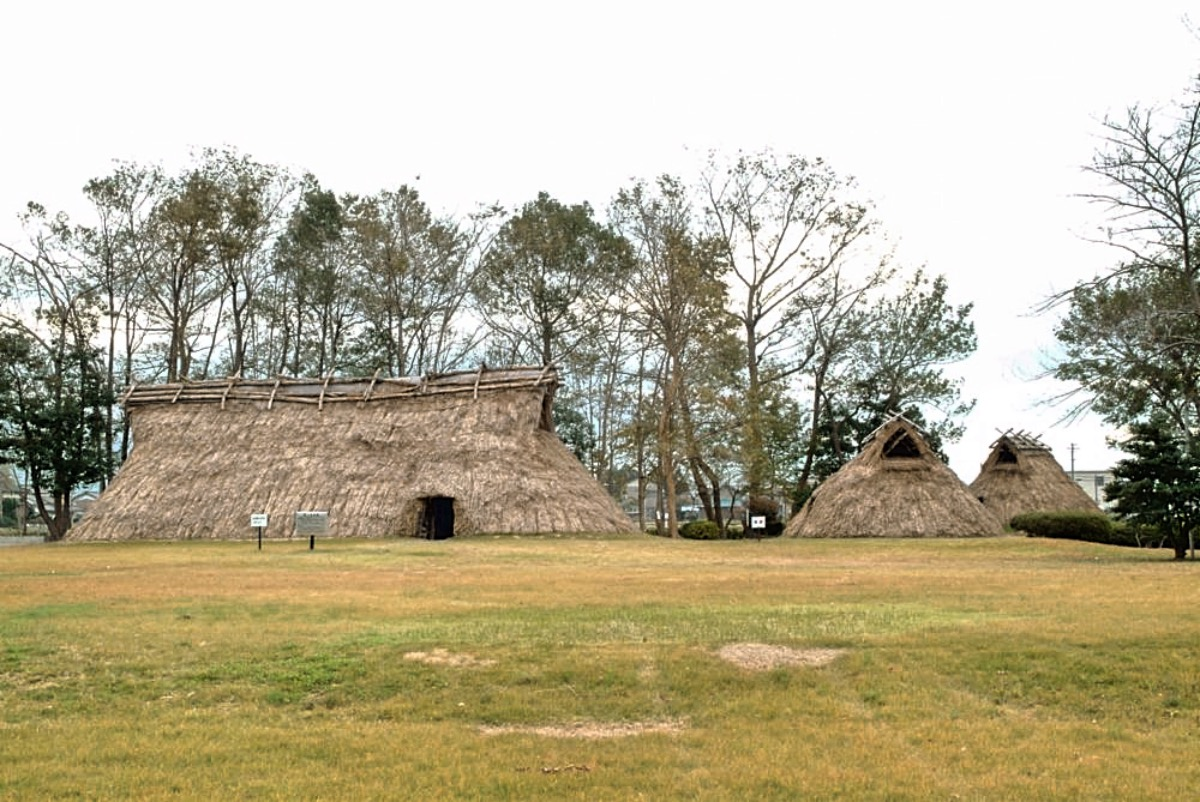
- Kitadai Site in 2017

- Location in Toyama, Japan
- 36°43′03″N 137°11′10″E
- Type: Settlement
- Periods: Jōmon period
- Location: Toyama, Toyama Prefecture, Japan

History
- Built: c. 2500 BC

Site notes
- Public access: Yes (park, museum)

Kitadai Site (北代遺跡, Kitadai Iseki) is an archaeological site with the ruins of a Jōmon period (around 2500 BC) settlement in the Kitadai neighborhood of the city of Toyama in the Hokuriku region of Japan. The site was designated a National Historic Site of Japan in 1986.

== Overview ==
The Kitadai site is located on at the northern end of the Kurehamachi hill, west of the city center of Toyama, at an elevation of 17 meters. It is approximately three kilometers northwest of Toyama Station and Toyama Castle. The settlement measured approximately 200 meters from north-to-south and 280 meters from east-to-west, and the foundations of four elevated floor buildings (possibly storehouses or ceremonial buildings) and more than 70 pit dwellings were discovered, making it one of the largest Jōmon settlements thus discovered in the Hokuriku region of Japan. The site has a complex stratification and appears to have been settled intermittently from the Japanese Paleolithic onwards into the Heian period. In the surrounding area are a number of shell middens and other remains. Only a small portion of the site has been excavated.

Artifacts recovered at this site include Kushidashin-style Jōmon pottery, jade beads, stone tools, clay figurines and various other items of ritual significance. It is probable that the location was a production center for stone tools and jade beads, as many rough stones and unfinished products were found.

The site is now the Kitadai Jōmon Square (北代縄文広場, Kitadai Jōmon Hiroba), an archaeological park and four pit dwellings and one elevated-floor building have been reconstructed, along with a small museum.

== See also ==
- List of Historic Sites of Japan (Toyama)
