= Ōzakai cave dwelling site =

Archaeological site in Himi, Japan

- 大境洞窟住居跡 (Japanese)
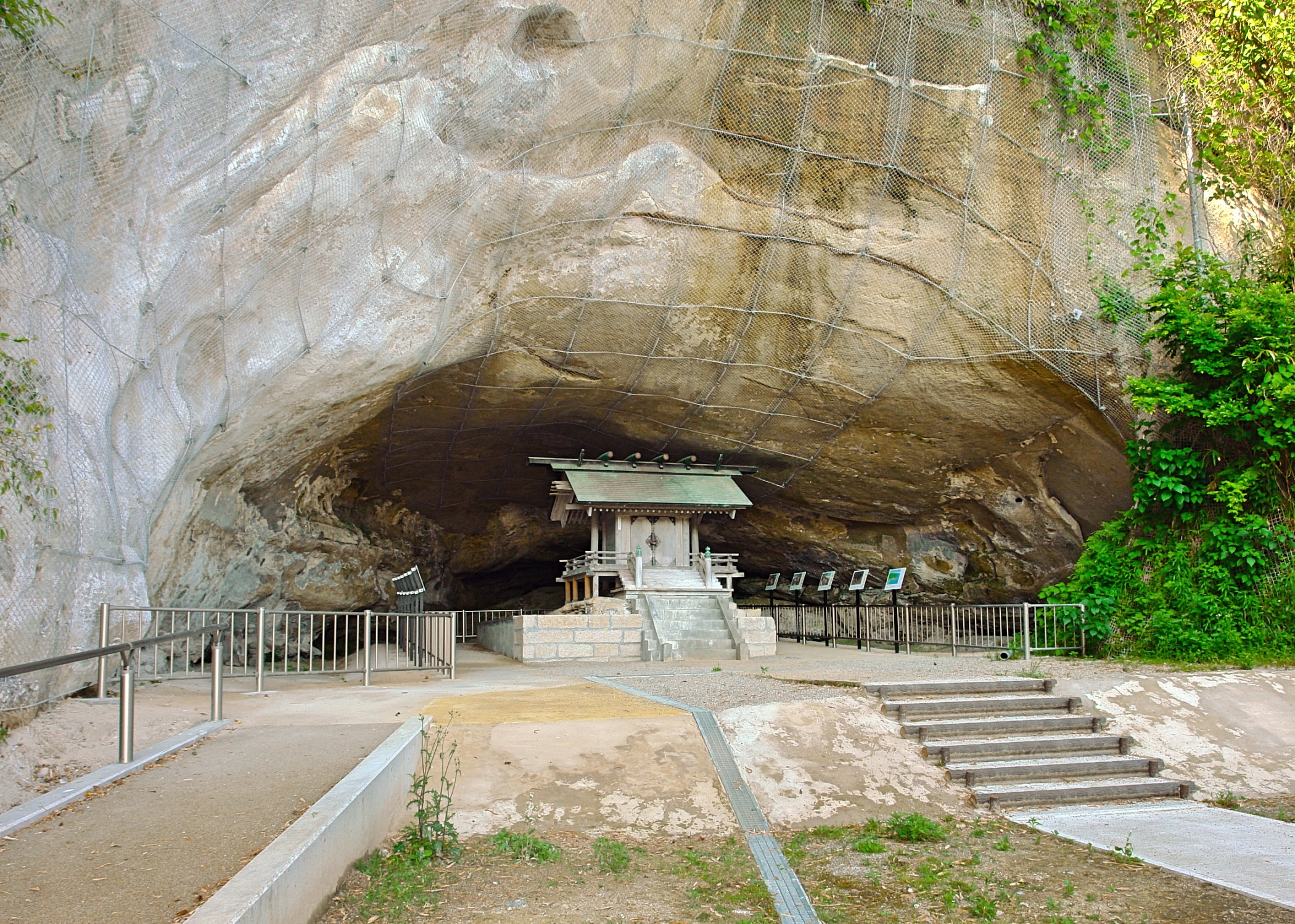
- Ōzakai cave dwelling site

- Ōzakai cave dwelling Ōzakai cave dwelling site (Japan)
- 36°55′22.0″N 137°1′48.8″E
- Type: settlement
- Periods: Jōmon to Kamakura
- Location: Himi, Toyama, Japan
- Region: Hokuriku region

Site notes
- Public access: Yes

The Ōzakai cave dwelling (大境洞窟住居跡, Ōzakai dōkutsu jūkyo ato) is an archaeological site consisting of a cave dwelling in the Ōzakai neighborhood of the city of Himi, Toyama Prefecture in the Hokuriku region of Japan. The site was designated a National Historic Site of Japan in 1986.

== Overview ==
The site was discovered when a Shinto shrine was being renovated near the fishing port of Himi in 1918. Within a large natural cave created by wave action, a number of bones and Jōmon pottery fragments were discovered and during a subsequent excavation by the Tokyo Imperial University, stone tools, earthenware, the bones of approximately 20 people were found.

The cave has a depth of 35 meters, with an entrance 16 meters wide, and eight meters high. The current floor is about four meters higher than the present sea level. The Ōzakai site was the first cave site in Japan and stratigraphic examination indicated that it had been occupied from the middle Jōmon period through the Kamakura period:

- Layer 1: Kamakura period to modern: ceramics, iron swords etc.
- Layer 2: Nara and Heian period: Sue ware, Haji pottery
- Layer 3: mid- to late-Kofun period: earthenware, animal remains
- Layer 4: mid-Yayoi period to early Kofun period: human bones, animal remains
- Layer 5: late Jōmon period to early Yayoi period: Yayoi pottery, stone tools, human bones, animal bones
- Layer 6: mid-Jōmon period: Jōmon pottery, stone tools, animal bones

The discovery of the Yayoi period human remains drew attention to the Yayoi custom of ritual tooth extractionand secondary burial (the skulls had red paint).

The site is located about 20 minutes by car from Himi Station on the JR West Himi Line.

== See also ==
- List of Historic Sites of Japan (Toyama)
