= List of historic sites of Japan (Toyama) =

This list is of the historic sites of Japan located within the Prefecture of Toyama.

== National Historic Sites ==
As of 1 August 2019, twenty-one Sites have been designated as being of national significance, including the Kaga Domain Maeda Clan Graves and Kaetsu border castle ruins, which span the prefectural borders with Ishikawa.

| Site | Municipality | Comments | Image | Coordinates | Type | Ref. |
|---|---|---|---|---|---|---|
| Jōbenoma Site じょうべのま遺跡 Jōbenoma iseki | Nyūzen | Heian shōen ruins | Jōbenoma Site | 36°57′15″N 137°29′42″E | 6 | 968 |
| Yasuda Castle Site 安田城跡 Yasuda-jō ato | Toyama | Sengoku period castle ruins | Yasuda Castle Site | 36°40′48″N 137°09′38″E | 2 | 969 |
| Etchū Gokayama Suganuma Hamlet 越中五箇山菅沼集落 Etchū Gokayama Suganuma shūraku | Nanto | forms part of the UNESCO World Heritage Site Historic Villages of Shirakawa-gō and Gokayama | Etchū Gokayama Suganuma Hamlet | 36°24′15″N 136°53′12″E | 6 | 962 |
| Etchū Gokayama Ainokura Hamlet 越中五箇山相倉集落 Etchū Gokayama Ainokura shūraku | Nanto | forms part of the UNESCO World Heritage Site Historic Villages of Shirakawa-gō and Gokayama | Etchū Gokayama Ainokura Hamlet | 36°25′33″N 136°56′07″E | 6 | 961 |
| Ōzuka-Senbōyama Sites 王塚・千坊山遺跡群 Ōzuka-Senbōyama iseki-gun | Toyama | Yayoi period settlement ruins | | 36°39′38″N 137°07′01″E | 1 | 959 |
| Kushidashin Site 串田新遺跡 Kushidashin iseki | Imizu | Jōmon period settlement | Kushidashin Site | 36°41′21″N 137°02′29″E | 1 | 967 |
| Takase Site 高瀬遺跡 Takase iseki | Nanto | early Heian period shōen ruins | Takase Site | 36°33′53″N 136°56′58″E | 6 | 963 |
| Sakuradani Kofun 桜谷古墳 Sakuradani kofun | Takaoka | Kofun period tumuli cluster | Sakuradani Kofun | 36°49′00″N 137°01′56″E | 1 | 952 |
| Kosugimaruyama Site 小杉丸山遺跡 Kosugimaruyama iseki | Imizu | Asuka period kiln ruins | Kosugimaruyama Site | 36°41′47″N 137°03′55″E | 1 | 972 |
| Kamiichi Kurokawa Sites 上市黒川遺跡群 Kamiichi Kurokawa iseki-gun | Kamiichi | Kamakura period ruins, designation includes the sites of the Ennenjiyama Sutra Mound (円念寺山経塚), Kurokawa Ueyama Graves (黒川上山墓跡), and Shingō-ji (伝真興寺跡) | | 36°42′53″N 137°24′09″E | 3, 7 | 00003468 |
| Masuyama Castle Site 増山城跡 Masuyama-jō ato | Tonami | Sengoku period castle ruins | Masuyama Castle Site | 36°39′08″N 137°02′36″E | 2 | 00003642 |
| Ōiwa Nissekiji Stone Buddhas 大岩日石寺石仏 Ōiwa Nissekiji sekibutsu | Kamiichi | Nara period bas-relief carvings | Ōiwa Nissekiji Stone Buddhas | 36°39′44″N 137°23′28″E | 3 | 951 |
| Ōzakai Cave Dwelling Site 大境洞窟住居跡 Ōzakai dōkutsu jūkyo ato | Himi | Jōmon period cave dwelling | Ōzakai Cave Dwelling Site | 36°55′22″N 137°01′49″E | 1 | 945 |
| Asahi Shell Mound 朝日貝塚 Asahi kaizuka | Himi | Jōmon period shell midden | Asahi Shell Mound | 36°50′55″N 136°59′04″E | 1 | 944 |
| Sugusaka Site 直坂遺跡 Sugusaka iseki | Toyama | Japanese Paleolithic settlement | | 36°33′35″N 137°13′12″E | 1 | 970 |
| Fudōdō Site 不動堂遺跡 Fudōdō iseki | Asahi | Jōmon period settlement | Fudōdō Site | 36°55′15″N 137°33′13″E | 1 | 966 |
| Kitadai Site 北代遺跡 Kitadai iseki | Toyama | Jōmon period settlement | Kitadai Site | 36°43′03″N 137°11′10″E | 1 | 971 |
| Yanaida Nunōyama Kofun 柳田布尾山古墳 Yanaida Nunōyama Kofun | Himi | Yayoi period tumuli | Yanaida Nunōyama Kofun | 36°49′24″N 136°59′27″E | 1 | 3278 |
| Kaga Domain Maeda Clan Graves 加賀藩主前田家墓所 Kaga-han-shu Maeda-ke bosho | Takaoka | designation includes an area of Kanazawa in Ishikawa Prefecture | Kaga Domain Maeda Clan Graves | 36°44′15″N 137°01′23″E | 7 | 00003621 |
| Kaetsu border castle ruins 加越国境城跡群及び道 切山城跡 松根城跡 小原越 Kaetsu-kuni-zakai shiro ato-gun oyobi michi Kiriyama-jō ato Matsune-jō ato Ohara-goe | Oyabe | Sengoku period castle ruins; designation includes the sites of Kiriyama Castle, Matsune Castle, and Ohara Pass spanning the Ishikawa-Toyama border | Kaetsu Territory Castle Sites and Roads | 36°36′58″N 136°47′00″E | 6 | 00003879 |
| Takaoka Castle ruins 高岡城跡 Takaoka Castle ruins | Takaoka | Edo Period Castle | Takaoka Castle ruins | 36°44′57″N 137°01′14″E | 6 | 00003893 |

== Prefectural Historic Sites ==
As of 1 May 2019, thirty Sites have been designated as being of prefectural importance.

| Site | Municipality | Comments | Image | Coordinates | Type | Ref. |
|---|---|---|---|---|---|---|
| Ao Castle Site 阿尾城跡; Ao-jō ato | Himi | | | 36°52′48″N 136°59′27″E | | |
| Sakai Ichirizuka 境一里塚; Sakai ichirizuka | Asahi | | | 36°58′35″N 137°37′28″E | | |
| Miyazaki Castle Site 宮崎城跡; Miyazaki-jō ato | Himi | | | 36°57′47″N 137°35′08″E | | |
| Chigozuka 稚児塚; Chigozuka | Tateyama | | | 36°41′34″N 137°19′08″E | | |
| Jōgahira Cave Tombs 城ガ平横穴古墳; Jōgahira ōketsu kofun-gun | Takaoka | | | 36°44′28″N 136°55′39″E | | |
| Ōzuka Kofun 大塚古墳; Ōzuka kofun | Imizu | | | 36°42′03″N 137°03′26″E | | |
| Sakuratōge Site 桜峠遺跡; Sakuratōge iseki | Uozu | | | 36°49′29″N 137°28′25″E | | |
| Matuskura Castle Site 松倉城跡; Matuskura-jō ato | Uozu | | | 36°45′44″N 137°26′27″E | | |
| Kitano Stone Buddha Niche 北野の石龕; Kitano no sekigan | Kurobe | | | 36°53′30″N 137°26′54″E | | |
| Gorintō 嘉暦四歳銘五輪石塔; Karyaku yonsai mei gorin sekitō | Kurobe | inscribed Karyaku 4 (1329) | | 36°53′19″N 137°25′56″E | | |
| Kareisawa Stone Buddhas 嘉例沢の石仏; Kareisawa sekibutsu | Kurobe | | | 36°49′42″N 137°32′04″E | | |
| Etchū Kokubun-ji Site 越中国分寺跡; Etchū Kokubunji ato | Takaoka | provincial temple of Etchū Province | | 36°47′52″N 137°02′57″E | | |
| Chokushizuka 勅使塚; Chokushizuka | Toyama | | | 36°39′38″N 137°07′01″E | | |
| Sakai Barrier Site 境関跡; Sakai seki ato | Asahi | | | 36°58′37″N 137°37′33″E | | |
| Inotani Barrier Site 猪谷関跡; Inotani seki ato | Toyama | | | 36°28′17″N 137°14′22″E | | |
| Kifune Castle Site 木舟城跡; Kifune-jō ato | Takaoka | | | 36°41′18″N 136°54′50″E | | |
| Ikuji Battery 生地台場; Ikuji daiba | Kurobe | | | 36°53′57″N 137°24′39″E | | |
| Miyanaga Jūzaemon Grave 宮永十佐エ門の墓; Miyanaga Jūzaemon no haka | Oyabe | | | 36°36′16″N 136°53′40″E | | |
| Zuiryū-ji Stone Tombs 瑞龍寺の石廟; Zuiryūji no sekibyō | Takaoka | | | 36°44′08″N 137°00′38″E | | |
| Aimotoshin Site 愛本新遺跡; Aimotoshin iseki | Kurobe | | | 36°53′14″N 137°32′31″E | | |
| Hongō Site 本江遺跡; Hongō iseki | Namerikawa | | | 36°43′38″N 137°23′05″E | | |
| Takase Site (Anada District) 高瀬遺跡 (穴田地区); Takase iseki (Anada chiku) | Nanto | | | 36°33′54″N 136°56′58″E | | |
| Hamayama Jewelry Workshop 浜山玉つくり遺跡; Hamayama tama-tsukuri iseki | Asahi | Kofun-period workshop for magatama, cylindrical beads, and other jewels | | 36°58′13″N 137°36′06″E | | |
| Nakayamaminami Site 中山南遺跡; Nakayamaminami iseki | Imizu | | | 36°42′19″N 137°06′32″E | | |
| Mizukamitani Site 水上谷遺跡; Mizukamitani iseki | Imizu | | | 36°39′56″N 137°04′03″E | | |
| Kanakusa No.1 Kiln Site 金草第一古窯跡; Kanakusa daiichi furu kama ato | Toyama | | | 36°41′51″N 137°09′21″E | | |
| Higashi-Kuromaki-Ueno Site 東黒牧上野遺跡; Higashi-Kuromaki-Ueno iseki | Toyama | | | 36°36′09″N 137°16′40″E | | |
| Kakoiyama Site 囲山遺跡; Kakoiyama iseki | Imizu | | | 36°42′33″N 137°05′24″E | | |
| Wakamiya Kofun 若宮古墳; Wakamiya kofun | Oyabe | | | 36°39′52″N 136°51′06″E | | |
| Shōmyō Falls Basin 称名滝とその流域; Shōmyō-daki to sono ryūiki | Tateyama | the falls are a national Place of Scenic Beauty and Natural Monument and a locus of Shugendō practice | | 36°34′33″N 137°31′36″E | | |

== Municipal Historic Sites ==
As of 1 May 2019, a further one hundred and eighty-five Sites have been designated as being of municipal importance.

== Registered Historic Sites ==
As of 1 July 2019, one Monument has been registered (as opposed to designated) as an Historic Site at a national level.

| Place | Municipality | Comments | Image | Coordinates | Type | Ref. |
|---|---|---|---|---|---|---|
| Tateyama Sabō Erosion Control Works Railway 立山砂防工事専用軌道; Tateyama sabō kōji sen-yō kidō | Tateyama | | | 36°33′55″N 137°29′20″E | | |

== See also ==
- Cultural Property (Japan)
- Etchū Province
- List of Places of Scenic Beauty of Japan (Toyama)
- List of Cultural Properties of Japan - historical materials (Toyama)
- List of Cultural Properties of Japan - paintings (Toyama)
