= Asahi Shell Mound =

Archaeological site in Japan

Asahi Shell Midden
- 朝日貝塚 (Japanese)
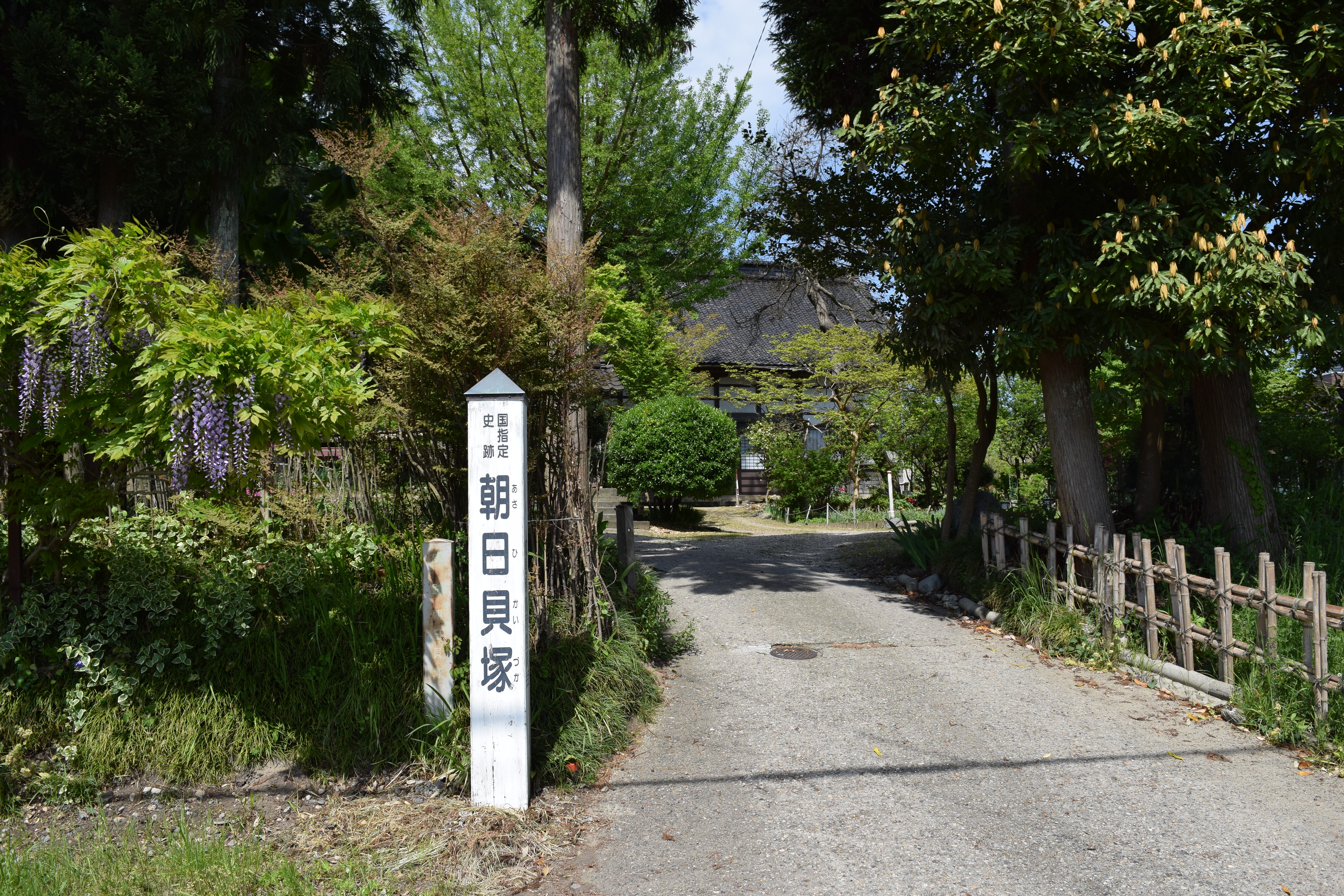
- Asahi Shell Midden

- Asahi Shell Midden Asahi Shell Mound (Japan)
- 36°50′54″N 136°58′0.7″E
- Type: shell midden
- Periods: Jōmon period
- Location: Himi, Toyama, Japan
- Region: Hokuriku region

Site notes
- Public access: Yes

The Asahi Shell Midden (朝日貝塚, Asahi kaizuka) is an archaeological site consisting of a shell midden and the remains of an adjacent Jōmon period settlement located in the Asahioka neighborhood the city of Himi, Toyama Prefecture in the Hokuriku region of Japan. The midden was designated a National Historic Site of Japan in 1922.

== Overview ==
During the early to middle Jōmon period (approximately 4000 to 2500 BC), sea levels were five to six metres (16 to 20 ft) higher than at present, and the ambient temperature was also 2 °C (3.6 °F) higher. During this period, the Hokuriku region was inhabited by the Jōmon people, many of whom lived in coastal settlements. The middens associated with such settlements contain bone, botanical material, mollusc shells, sherds, lithics, and other artifacts and ecofacts associated with the now-vanished inhabitants, and these features, provide a useful source into the diets and habits of Jōmon society. Most of the shell middens are found along the Pacific coast of Japan

The Asahi Shell midden is an unusual example of a shell midden on the Sea of Japan coastline. It is located in the southwestern part of Himi, on the Asahiyama hill which extends from the west to the east through the center of the city area. An excavation survey was conducted by Tokyo Imperial University several times since the discovery of the midden in July 1918 during the re-construction of Seido-ji, a Buddhist temple which had formerly covered most of the remains. The midden dates from the early to late Jōmon period. During a second survey in 1924, traces of at least two residences with hearths were discovered, overlapping earlier Jōmon period remains. This was highly significant as it was the first archaeological site on the Sea of Japan where a dwelling site was discovered. Jōmon pottery with a basket-weave pattern and a large jade cylindrical bead with a length of 16 centimetres (6.3 in) also drew scholarly attention.

Excavations in 1926 and 1949 unearthed a total of five sets of human remains. Yayoi pottery and Sue ware have also been excavated from the upper part of the shell layer and the topsoil layer.

== See also ==
- List of Historic Sites of Japan (Toyama)
