= Kaga Domain Maeda Clan Graves =

Edo period mausoleum in Takaoka, Japan

Maeda Toshinaga Masoleum
- 前田利長墓所 (Japanese)
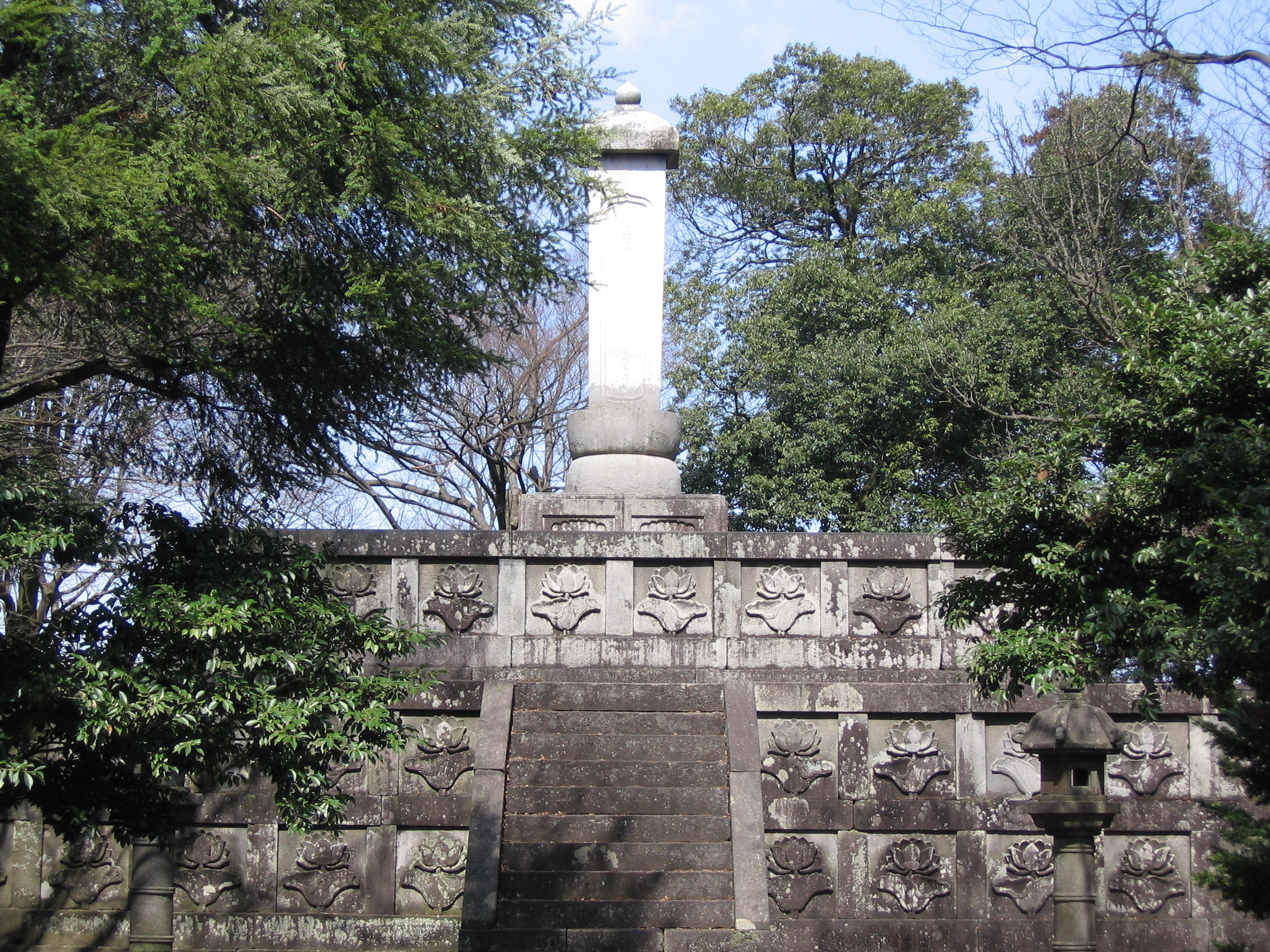
- Maeda Toshinaga Masoleum

- Maeda Toshinaga Masoleum Kaga Domain Maeda Clan Graves (Japan)
- 36°44′15″N 137°01′23″E
- Periods: Edo period
- Location: Takaoka, Toyama, Japan
- Region: Hokuriku region

History
- Built: 1646

Site notes
- Excavation dates: 2007
- Public access: Yes

Kaga Domain Maeda clan Graves (加賀藩主前田家墓所, Kaga-hanshu Maeda-ke Byōsho) is a National Historic Site covering the monumental mausoleum of the Sengoku samurai and early Edo period daimyō of Kaga Domain, Maeda Toshinaga located in the city of Takaoka, Toyama Prefecture and the large Nodayama cemetery containing 80 graves of the Maeda clan, located in the city of Kanazawa, Ishikawa Prefecture.

== Overview ==
=== Mausoleum of Maeda Toshinaga ===
Maeda Toshinaga Masoleum (前田利長墓所, Maeda Toshinaga Byōsho) is the monumental mausoleum of Maeda Toshinaga (1562–1614), a Sengoku samurai and early Edo period daimyō of Kaga Domain, located in the city of Takaoka, Toyama Prefecture.

Maeda Toshinaga was the eldest son of Maeda Toshiie and first daimyō of Kaga Domain. He died at Takaoka Castle in 1614. His brother, Maeda Toshinori, the third daimyō of Kaga Domain, built this massive mausoleum complex in the outskirts of Takaoka. The tombstone itself is an eight-meter tall slab of granite on a three tier base, surrounded by stone fences and two concentric moats and three sides. At present, the area of the mausoleum covers approximately 10,000 square meters; however, as a result of an archaeological survey conducted in 2007, its original extent was three times larger (i.e. 33,000 square meters) which is consistent with the dimensions found in historical records preserved by the Maeda clan. This makes it by far the largest tomb of any Sengoku period warlord. It was clearly designed for secondary use as a fortification in times of emergency. At present, the inner moat is largely filled in, and much of the outer area is part of the adjacent Takaoka Municipal Yoshiko Junior High School grounds or the Takaoka Municipal Maeda Tennis Courts.

On January 1, 1965, it was designated as a Toyama prefectural historic site, and on February 12, 2009, along with the Maeda clan cemetery in Nodayama in the city of Kanazawa it was designated a national historic site.

Nodayama Maeda clan cemetery
- 野田山加賀藩主前田家 墓所 (Japanese)
- Nodayama Maeda clan cemetery Kaga Domain Maeda Clan Graves (Japan)
- 36°31′36″N 136°39′52″E
- Periods: Edo period
- Location: Kanazawa, Ishikawa, Japan
- Region: Hokuriku region

Site notes
- Public access: Yes

=== Nodayama Maeda clan cemetery ===
Nodayama Maeda Clan cemetery (野田山加賀藩主前田家 墓所, Nodoyama Kaga-han Maeda-ke Byōsho) is a cemetery containing the graves of the various Edo period daimyō of Kaga Domain, located in the city of Kanazawa, Ishikawa Prefecture . The Nodayama cemetery is located to the south of the city center of Kanazawa, and is the largest public cemetery in the city. In addition to the tombs of successive generations of the Maeda clan, who served as daimyō over the provinces of Kaga, Noto and Etchū Provinces under the Tokugawa shogunate, the cemetery also has the graves of noted local residents and also numerous graves of the war dead from the region. The area protected under the National Historic Site designation is only the portion containing the Maeda clan graves, and covers and area of 86,294.35 square meters.

Within the Nodayama cemetery are the graves of some 80 members of the Maeda clan, including daimyō, official wives, and various children. The graves are unusual in that they take the form of dome-shaped tumuli in three layers, with a grave marker in front of each tumulus, resembling ancient dome-shaped kofun. Most of the daimyō graves have a diameter of 16 meters, with the exception of the grave of Maeda Toshiie, which is the largest at 19-meters. The size of these graves is unparalleled by other daimyō graveyards. Surrounding the tombs of each daimyō and his family are many smaller tombs for important retainers of the clan, as well as numerous Edo-period tombs of important residents of Kanazawa.

== See also ==
- List of Historic Sites of Japan (Toyama)
- List of Historic Sites of Japan (Ishikawa)
