= Yanaida Nunōyama Kofun =

- 柳田布尾山古墳 (Japanese)
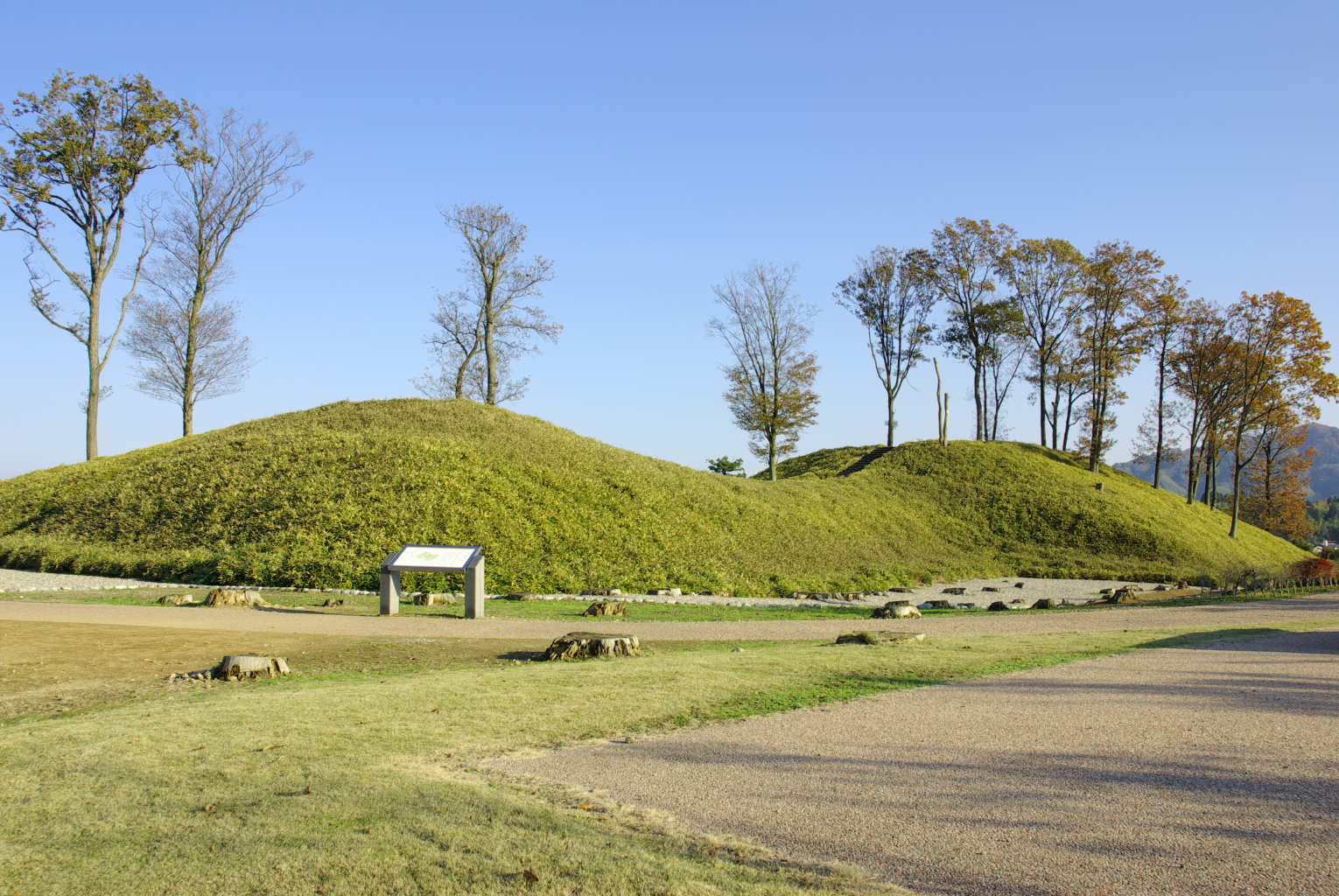
- Yanaida Nunooyama Kofun

- Yanaida Nunooyama Kofun Yanaida Nunōyama Kofun (Japan)
- 36°49′24″N 136°59′27″E
- Type: kofun
- Periods: Kofun period
- Location: Himi, Toyama, Japan
- Region: Hokuriku region

History
- Built: late 4th or early 5th century AD

Site notes
- Excavation dates: 1998-2001
- Public access: Yes (park and museum)

Yanaida Nunōyama Kofun (柳田布尾山古墳) is a kofun burial mound located in the Yanaida neighborhood of the city of Himi, Toyama in the Hokuriku region of Japan. The tumulus has been protected as a National Historic Site since 2001.

== Outline ==
The Yanaida Nunōyama Kofun is located in the northwest part of Toyama prefecture, near the eastern base of Noto Peninsula and approximately two kilometers from the shore of Toyama Bay, at an elevation of approximately 25 meters above sea level. With a length of 107.5 meters, it is the largest "two conjoined rectangles" type tumulus zenpō-kōhō-fun (前方後方墳) on the Sea of Japan coast, and the 10th largest in the country. It was discovered only in 1998, and was excavated from 1998 to 2001. No haniwa or fukiishi were discovered, and the tumulus was found to have been robbed at some time in antiquity. The time of its construction is estimated to date from the end of the 3rd to the late 4th century, and there is no indication of who was buried in this tomb. Keyhole-shaped tombs are commonly attributed to a connection with the Yamato kingdom, whereas "two conjoined rectangle"-type tumuli are found more commonly in western Japan, where there is a connection to the Izumo Kingdom. From its size and its location near an ancient port, it has been speculated that this was the tomb of a powerful chief with connections through trade to both polities.

- Total length: 107.5 meters
- Main Portion: 2-stages, 54 meter length x 53 meter width x 10 meter height
- Keyway Portion: 2-stages, 53.5 meter length x 49 meter width x 6 meter height

The tumulus was constructed by partly cutting away the ground on a narrow terrace, such that the embankment volume is about 60% of the total volume of the tumulus. It is orientated to the north-northwest. The tumulus was surrounded by an amorphous moat measuring 5 to 18 meters wide and 1.2 to 1.2 meters deep. The tomb appears to be built on the site of a Yayoi period settlement, as Yayoi pottery has been found in the area.

There is a smaller (25 meter diameter) circular tumulus (円墳) surrounded by a five-meter wide and 1.6 meter deep moat is located on the eastern rear side of the tomb. Details of its construction are unknown as it has not been excavated.

The area is now open to the public as part of an archaeological park with a small museum. It is about 10 minutes by car from Himi Station on the JR West Himi Line.

== Gallery ==
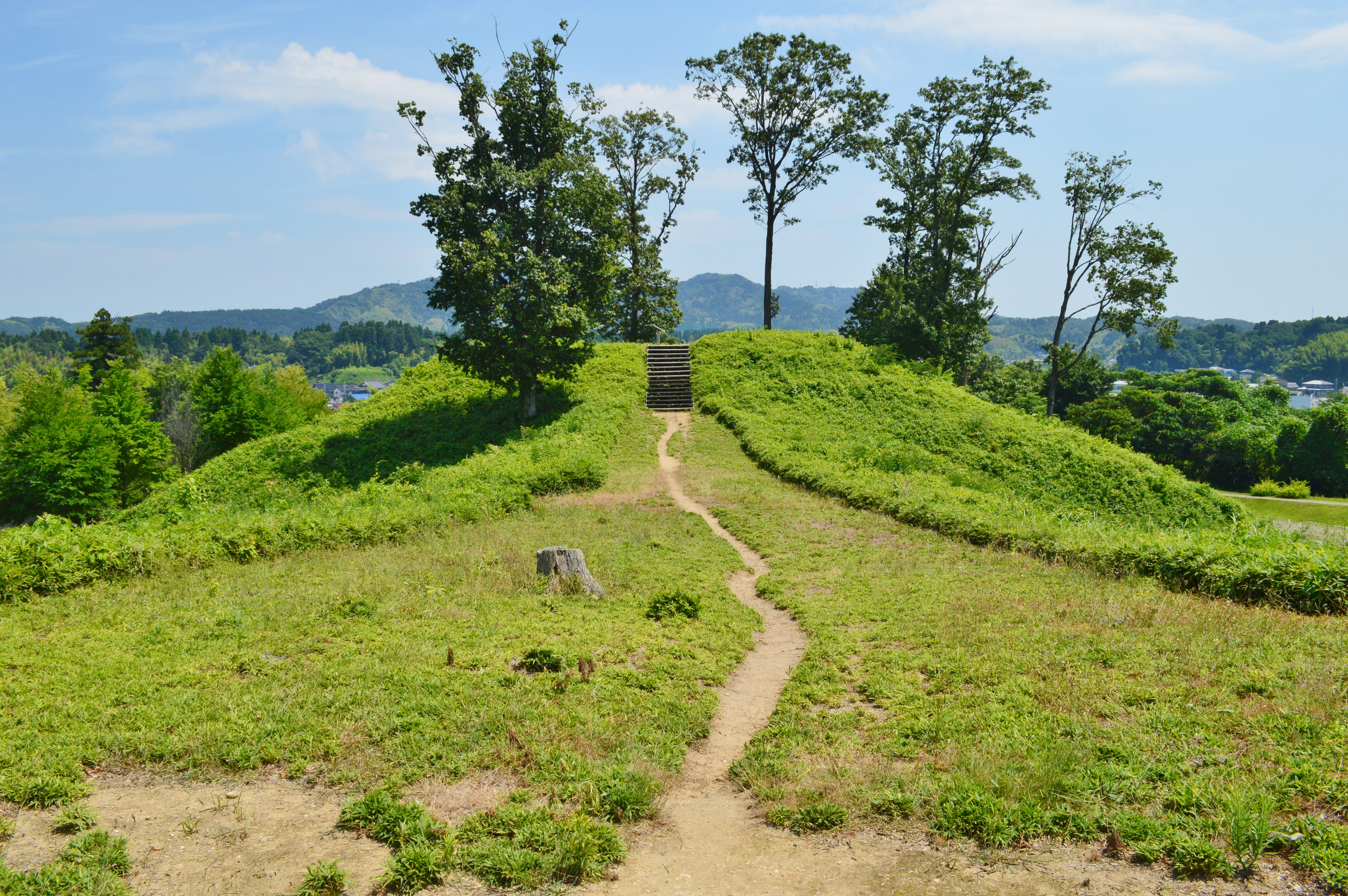
From front looking toward rear

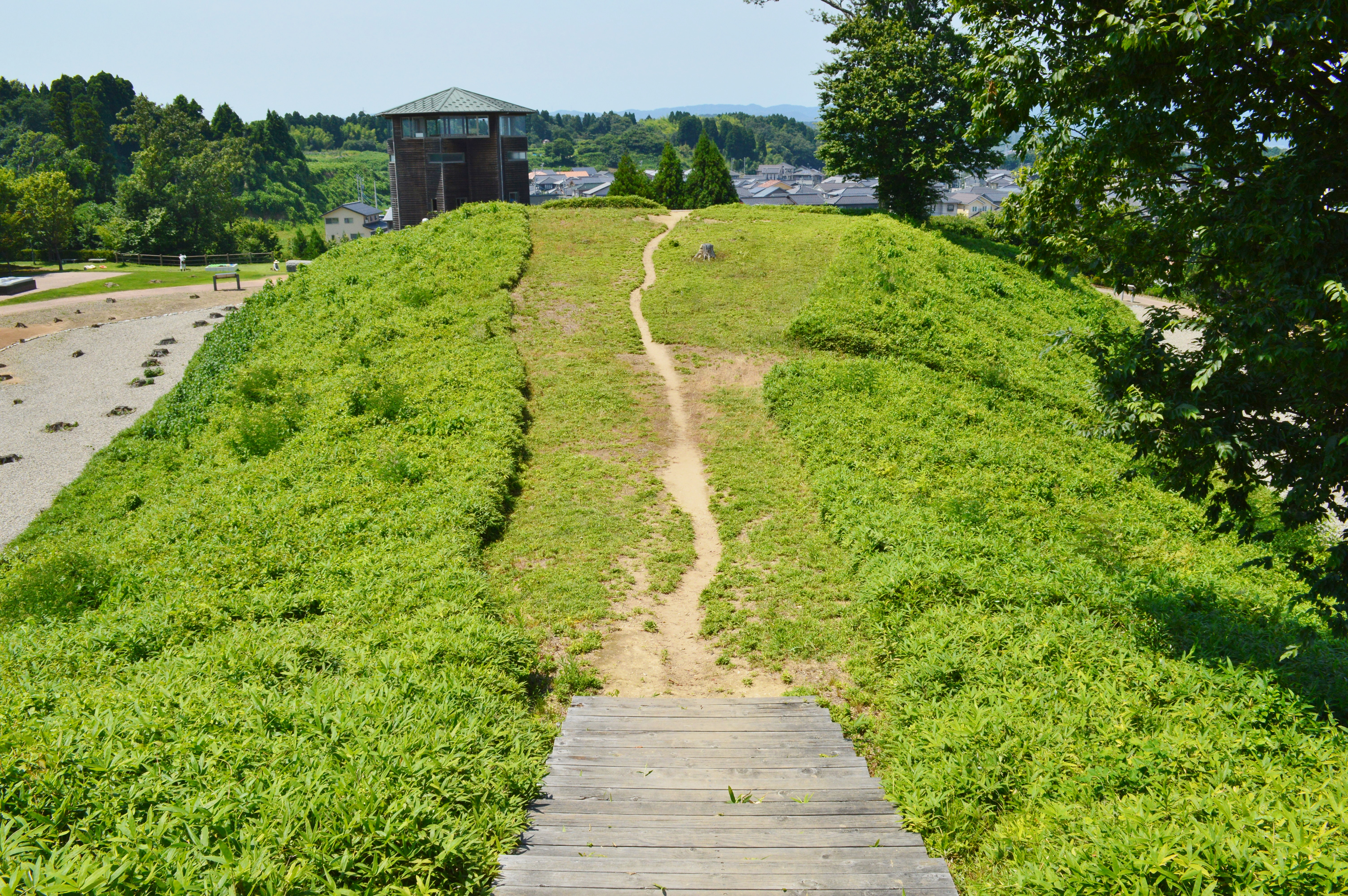
From rear looking towards front

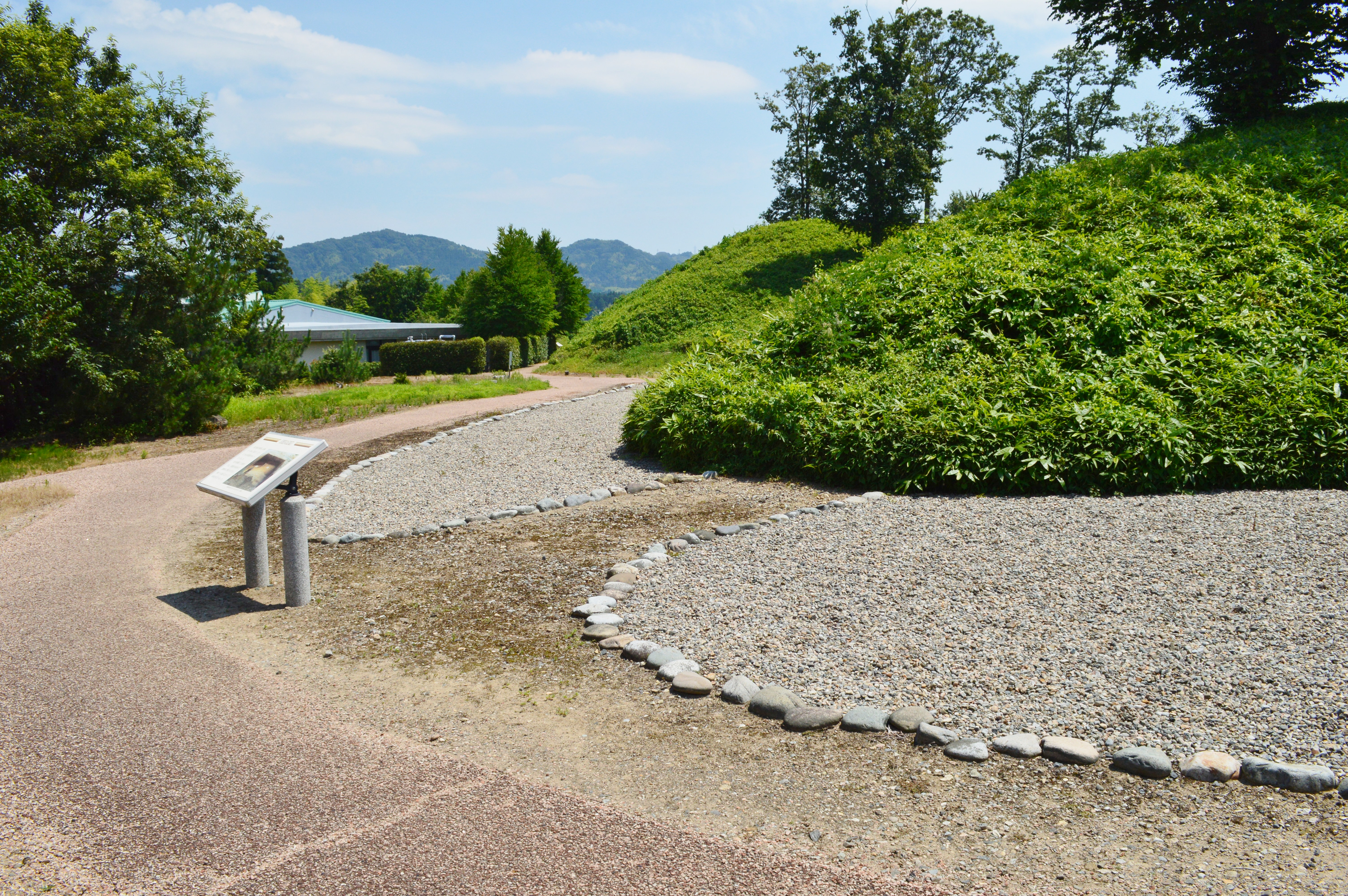
Bridge across moat on east side

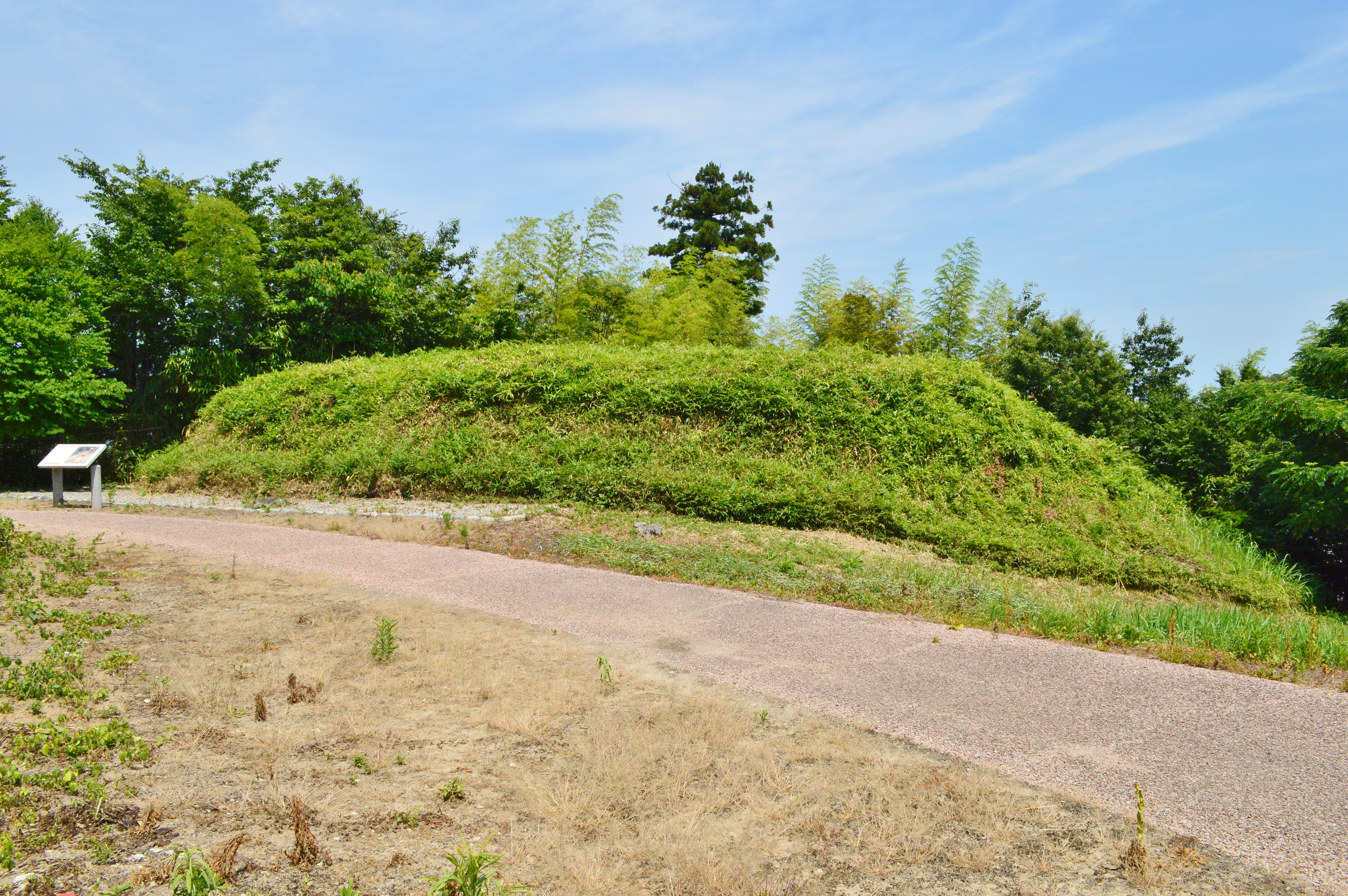
No.2 tumulus

== See also ==
- List of Historic Sites of Japan (Toyama)
