= Sugusaka Site =

Japanese Paleolithic settlement

- 直坂遺跡 (Japanese)
- Sugusaka Site Sugusaka Site (Japan)
- 36°33′35″N 137°13′12″E
- Periods: Japanese Paleolithic
- Location: Toyama, Toyama, Japan
- Region: Hokuriku region

Site notes
- Elevation: 175 m (574 ft)
- Excavation dates: 1971
- Public access: Yes

The Sugusaka Site (直坂遺跡) is an archaeological site in the Sugusaka neighborhood of the city of Toyama in the Hokuriku region of Japan containing the ruins of a settlement from the Japanese Paleolithic period to the Jōmon period. It has been protected as a National Historic Site since 1981.

== Location ==
The Sugusaka site is located on a fluvial terrace on the right bank of the Jinzū River in what is now part of the Sarukurayama ski resort on the outskirts of Toyama. This location marks the border between the mountainous interior of Toyama and the coastal plains. A number of other archaeological sites from the Japanese Palaeolithic to the Jōmon era are located in the vicinity, including the Nozawa site, Yagiyama Ono site, Naosaka II site, Naosaka III site, and Naosaka IV site, indicating that this area has been densely populated since the earliest times.

== Discovery & surveys ==
The Sugusaka site was discovered in 1971 when a stone hearth dating from the middle of the Jōmon period was discovered during construction work for the establishment of a ranch. In response, in 1972 the Toyama Board of Education conducted excavation surveys of the area.

== Archaeological findings ==
Some 1200 stone blades were found dating to the Japanese Paleolithic period. These blades were dated to about 25,000 to 30,000 years ago, and are thus the oldest thus found in the Hokuriku region. Apart from this, local polished stone axes, projectile points, and carving tools have been excavated. The site also contained thousands of fist-sized stones which had burn marks. These stones appear to have used for cooking purposes: they would be heated in a fire and then dropped into a container.

Early examples of embossed Jōmon pottery were also found, including pottery with patterns created by a rolling die. They mainly featured elliptical patterns. These pottery shards were from the Hida, Shinano, Kinki and Tōkai regions indicating the existence long range trade routes beginning very early in Japanese history. By the middle Jōmon period, the settlement had extended along the valley extending to the north and south, with numerous pit dwellings surrounding a central plaza.

== Current status ==
The site, which was backfilled after excavation and is now an empty lot.

== See also ==
- List of Historic Sites of Japan (Toyama)
