= Ōzuka-Senbōyama Sites =

Group of seven archaeological sites in Japan

- 王塚・千坊山遺跡群 (Japanese)
- Ōzuka-Senbōyama Sites Ōzuka-Senbōyama Sites (Japan)
- 36°39′38″N 137°07′01″E
- Type: settlement, kofun
- Periods: Yayoi period
- Location: Toyama, Japan
- Region: Hokuriku region

History
- Built: 3rd and 4th century AD

Site notes
- Public access: Yes (no facilities)

Ōzuka-Senbōyama Sites (王塚・千坊山遺跡群) is a group of seven archaeological sites located in what is now part of the city of Toyama in the Hokuriku region of Japan. The sites consist of the ruins of a settlement which existed from the late Jōmon period through Kofun period, and several necropolis with numerous kofun burial mounds. The Ōzuka Kofun received protection as a National Historic Site in 1948 and the area under protection was expanded to cover the other six sites in 2005.

== Outline ==
The site is located in central Toyama Prefecture, in an inland area some 12 kilometers from Toyama Bay on the Sea of Japan at an average elevation of 110 meters. The site is about ten minutes by car from Hayahoshi Station on the JR West Takayama Line. A total of seven areas are covered under the National Historic Site designation:

1. The Senbōyama Site (千坊山遺跡) (45,654 square meters) contains the ruins of a large Yayoi period settlement at an elevation of 35 to 52 meters, overlooking the Nei Plain to the east. Thus far, 25 pit dwellings have been discovered. The dwellings included large circular dwellings (9.5 to 11.5 meters in diameter), square dwellings (6 to 9 meters on each side) and small square dwellings ( 4 to 7 meters on each side). Numerous varieties of Yayoi pottery have been found. The latter half of the Yayoi period was a period of war, which was described in Chinese history books as the Civil War of Wa. Many lowland Yayoi settlement were abandoned, and new settlements were constructed on hilltop locations, with defensive moats, earthen ramparts and wooden palisades. The ruins of many such settlements have been found throughout the Hokuriku region. Although the Senbōyama Site was probably chosen for defensive purposes, no traces of a moat or rampart have yet been found.

2. The Rokuji Kozuka Kofun (六治古塚墳墓) (2,490 square meters)is a rectangular "corner protruding" (Yosumi tosshutsugata funkyūbo) tumulus from the late Yayoi period. This style of tomb was previously found only in the San'in region of Japan. It is located in the southern margin of a river terrace at an elevation of 57 meters near the Senbōyama Site and is believed to be contemporary with that settlement . It measures 24.5 meters on each side, with a height of 5.1 meters, with the protruding portion 7.2 meters long and 10.6 meters wide. Many fragments of Yayoi pottery were found at the site. The presence of such a tomb at this location indicates as strong political and cultural connection with the San'in region, possibly the ancient Kingdom of Izumo.

3. The Mukainozuka Kofun (向野塚墳墓) (1,896 square meters) is a late Yayoi to early Kofun period "two conjoined rectangle-shaped tumulus" (zenpō-kōhō-fun (前方後方墳)), located 110 meters northeast of the Rokuji Kozuka Kofun at an elevation of 52 meters. Its design shows a transition phase between the rectangular tombs of the Yayoi period and the true keyhole-shaped tombs of the Kofun period, and is believed to have been built by the same people who settled the Senbōyama Site. The tomb has a 25.2 meter total length with an anterior portion 10.2 meters long and 8.1 meters wide and a posterior portion 15.0 meters long and 16.5 meters wide and 1.7 meters high. There are traces of a moat. In the center, the existence of a burial chamber has been confirmed, but the mound has not been opened. Large quantities of Yayoi pottery have been recovered from the site. It is presumed to be the tomb of the chief of the area, who lived at the Senbōyama site 270 meters northeast.

4. The Tomisaki Kofungun (富崎墳墓群) (8,118 square meters) is a cluster of three late Yayoi period rectangular "corner protruding" tombs (Yosumi tosshutsugata funkyūbo) located on the right bank of the Yamadagawa River on the northern margin of Tomisaki hill at an elevation of about 70 meters. Mound No.1 is 21.7 meters on a side, with a height of 3 meters. Mound No.2 is estimated to be about the same size as Mound No.1, but it is extensively damaged. Both have moats. Mound No.3 is located 150 meters apart across a small valley and is slightly larger at 22 meters per side with a height of 3.9 meters, with moats only on the sides. In each case, the protrusion has a length of 6 meters.

5. The Tomisaki Chisato Kofungun (富崎千里古墳群) (27,651 square meters) is a necropolis built in the early Kofun period, of which 17 kofun (one keyhole shaped, one dome-shaped, and 15 rectangular-shaped) have thus far been discovered. It is located in the east margin of the Tomisaki Hills at an elevation of 55 meters. The necropolis is divided into a north group and a south group separated by a valley, but only the southern group is part of the National Historic Site. Mound No.9 is the only two conjoined-rectangle type tumulus in the group and is located at the highest elevation. It has a total length of 34 meters, with the anterior 14 meters long, 13.7 meters wide, 1.6 meters high, the posterior is 20 meters long, 19 meters wide, 4.1meters high, and the constricted part is 6.8 meters wide. Haji ware pottery, including jars and cups of pedestals with traces of red pigment have been found. Mound No. 10 is then only dome-shaped tumulus in the groups, and has a diameter of 20 meters and a height of 4.3 meters. The remaining are square tumuli. No.6 is representative of the remaining tumuli, and has a long side of 15.4 meters, a short side of 12 meters, and a height of 3.3 meters.

6. The Ōzuka Kofun (王塚古墳) (2,452 square meters) is one of the oldest and the fourth largest two conjoined rectangle-shaped kofun (zenpō-kōhō-fun (前方後方墳)) in Toyama Prefecture. It has a total length of 58 meters. The anterior portion is 27 meters by 26 meters and 3.6 meters high, and the posterior portion is 31 meters by 33 meters with a height of 7.6 meters. As the mound is considerably weathered, it may have originally been even larger. There are traces of a moat. This kofun has never been excavated, so its interior structure and the presence of any grave goods is unknown. It is presumed to be the tomb of the chief who ruled the Nei district, along with the Teshizuka tumulus, which is 400 meters south of the valley.

7. The Chokushizuka Kofun (勅使塚古墳) (27,651 square meters) is a large conjoined-rectangle style tumulus dating from the 3rd century. It measures 66 meters in total length, with a posterior portion 31 meters x 24 meters with height of 3.5 meters and an anterior portion of 35 meters x 37 meters (narrowing to 11 meters in the waist) and a height of 9 meters, with a partial moat. It was found to contain a rectangular burial chamber measuring 6.2 meters by 6.1 meters containing the remnants of a wooden sarcophagus and a large number of grave goods. These included red-coated Haji ware pottery, as well as pottery from the Kinai region. It is presumed to be the tomb of the chief who ruled the Nei district, along with the Ōzuka Kofun, which is 400 meters north of the valley.

== See also ==
- List of Historic Sites of Japan (Toyama)
