= Hannoki Falls =

Coordinates: 36°34′31″N 137°31′24″E

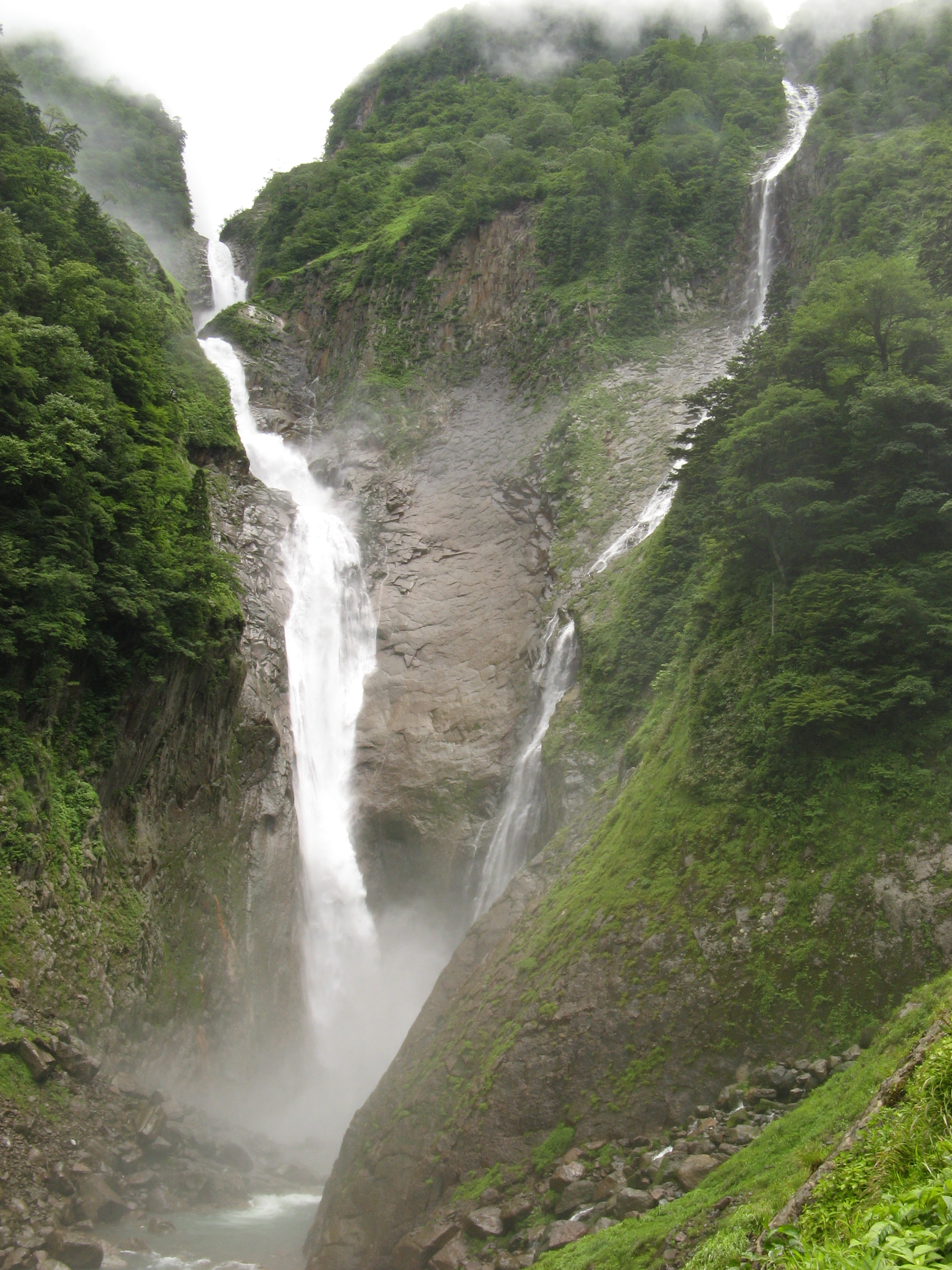
Shōmyō Falls (left) and Hannoki Falls (right)

Hannoki Falls, in Toyama Prefecture, Japan, is the tallest waterfall in Japan at a height of 497 m (1,640 feet). However, it is a seasonal waterfall, which only has water from April to July when the snow covering the Midagahara plateau melts, so its neighbor, Shōmyō Falls, is usually considered the tallest. Hannoki and Shōmyō falls are twin waterfalls that almost face each other.

== See also ==
- List of waterfalls
- List of waterfalls in Japan
