= Kamiichi Kurokawa Sites =

- 上市黒川遺跡群 (Japanese)
- Kamiichi Kurokawa Sites Kamiichi Kurokawa Sites (Japan)
- 36°42′53″N 137°24′09″E
- Periods: Heian to Kamakura period
- Location: Kamiichi, Toyama, Japan
- Region: Hokuriku region

Site notes
- Excavation dates: 1981
- Public access: Yes (no facilities)

The Kamiichi Kurokawa Sites (上市黒川遺跡群, Kamiichi Kurosawa iseki gun) is a group of archaeological sites in the town of Kamiichi, Toyama Prefecture in the Hokuriku region of Japan. It has been collectively protected as a National Historic Site since 1981.

== Outline ==
The National Historic Site designation encompasses three discontinuous but related areas within Kamiichi at the foot of Mount Tateyama which contain the ruins of a Buddhist temple, a cemetery, and a sutra mound built from the end of the Heian period through the Kamakura period, which are noteworthy both for their size but also for the quality of excavated items. The sites are located about 15 minutes by car from Kamiichi Station on the Toyama Chiho Railway Main Line; however, there are no public facilities.

=== Ennenjiyama Sutra Mound ===
The Ennenjiyama Sutra Mound (円念寺山経塚) is actually a cluster of 24 sutra mounds, making it the latest such cluster yet discovered in the Hokuriku region. The sutra containers include Suzu ware and ceramics imported from China during the early Kamakura period and also include a number of Shingon Buddhism ritual implements from the late Heian through Kamakura periods.

=== Kurokawa Ueyama Cemetery site ===
The Kurokawa Ueyama Cemetery (黒川上山墓跡) was in use from the end of the Heian period through the middle of the Kamakura period. Located on a hillside, some 67 densely-packed graves containing cremated remains have been discovered.

=== Shingō-ji ===
The temple of Shingō-ji (真興寺跡) is mentioned in historical records, but its exact location is not documented. This site was found to contain the foundations of monumental gate, pagoda, Hondō and a pond in a configuration which is in accord with what is known of the Shingon-sect temple of Shingō-ji in historical records.

== See also ==
- List of Historic Sites of Japan (Toyama)
