= Kushidashin Site =

Archaeological site in Imizu, Toyama, Japan

- 串田新遺跡 (Japanese)
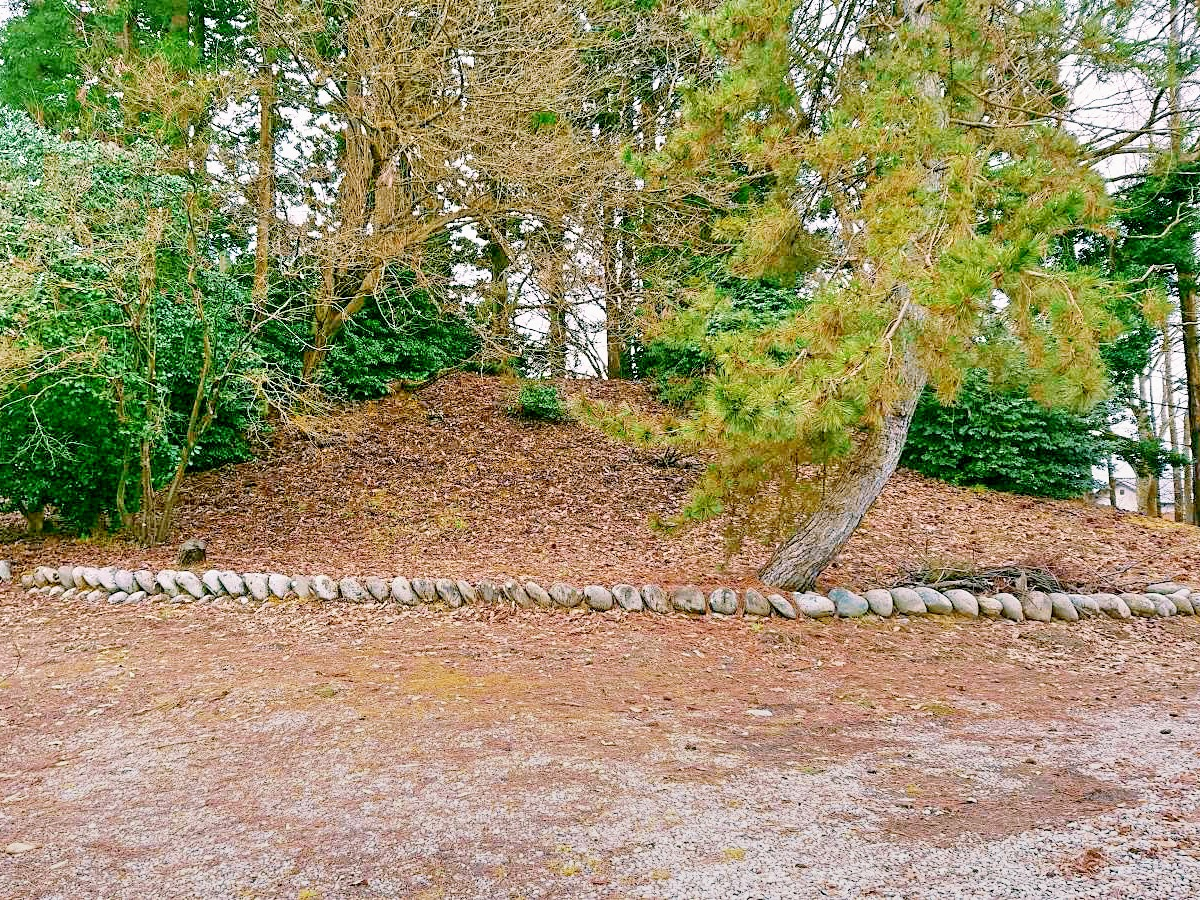
- Kushidashin kofun

- Kushidashin Site Kushidashin Site (Japan)
- 36°41′21″N 137°02′29″E
- Type: Settlement, Kofun
- Location: Imizu, Toyama, Japan
- Region: Hokuriku region

History
- Built: Jōmon, Kofun period

Site notes
- Elevation: 45 m (148 ft)
- Public access: Yes

The Kushidashin Site (串田新遺跡, Kushidashin Iseki) is an archaeological site containing the remnants of a late Jōmon period settlement and encompassing two circular Kofun period burial mounds located in what is now the Daimon neighborhood of the city of Imizu, Toyama in the Hokuriku region of Japan. The site was designated a National Historic Site of Japan in 1976.

== Overview ==
The Kushidashin Site is located on a hill with an elevation of approximately 45 meters. An excavation survey was conducted in 1949, and middle and late period Jōmon pottery of a style unique to this site was excavated. The ruins included the foundations of a number of pit dwellings with stone-lined hearths. Also within the close proximity were two small dome-shaped kofun (円墳) from the much later Kofun period. Currently, it is maintained as an archaeological park. It is located about 20 minutes by car from Takaoka Station on the JR West Hokuriku Main Line.

== See also ==
- List of Historic Sites of Japan (Toyama)
