= Takase Site =

- 高瀬遺跡 (Japanese)
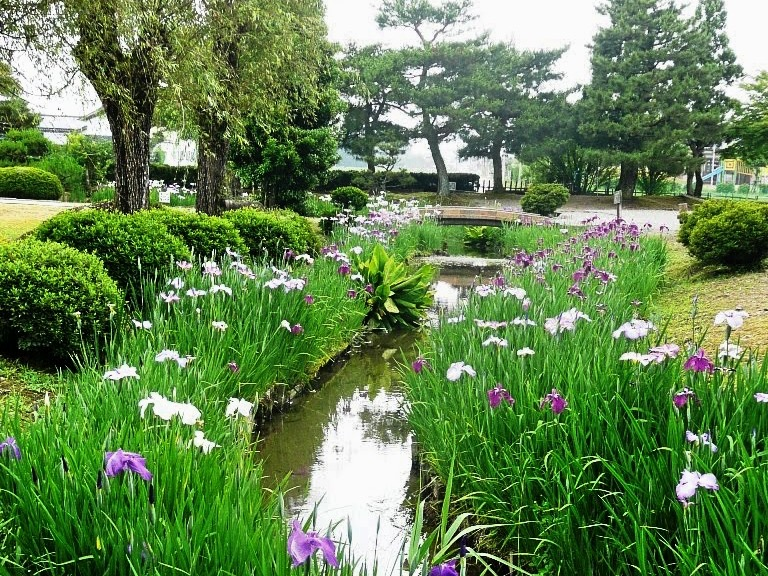
- Takase iseki Park

- Takase Site Takase Site (Japan)
- 36°33′53″N 136°56′58″E
- Periods: Heian period
- Location: Nanto, Toyama, Japan
- Region: Hokuriku region

Site notes
- Excavation dates: 1971
- Public access: Yes(park and museum)

The Takase Site (高瀬遺跡) is an archaeological site in the Ishibotoke neighborhood of the city of Nanto, Toyama Prefecture in the Hokuriku region of Japan containing the ruins of a shōen from the early Heian period. It has been protected by the central government as a National Historic Site since 1981. It was the first ruin of a shōen to receive such status.

== Outline ==
The shōen or landed estates were private, tax-free, and autonomous feudal manors which arose with the decline of the ritsuryō system. The earliest shōen developed in the Nara period to encourage land reclamation and provided for the succession of the right to cultivate reclaimed fields in perpetuity. Later shōen developed from land tracts assigned to officially sanctioned Shintō shrines or Buddhist temples or granted by the emperor as gifts to the Imperial relatives, nobles, or officials as tax-free grants. In either case, as these estates grew, they became independent of the civil administrative system and contributed to the rise of a local military class. At first, the hereditary steward of the estate (jitō) paid a portion of his revenues to the nominal "owner" in Kyoto for continued protection from taxes or other interference from the government, but by the Kamakura period, even this nominal relationship faded away.

The area south of the Takase Shrine was known for many years as a location where shards of Sue pottery and Haji pottery could be found. The Takase Shrine is one of the Shinto shrines calming the title of ichinomiya of Etchū Province, so it is of very ancient foundation. This area was located in paddy fields on the Tonami Plain at the foot of Mount Yaotome in the southwestern part of Toyama Prefecture. During field maintenance work in 1970, the foundations of a 5 x 4 bay building were discovered. In subsequent excavations in 1972, the foundations of two more buildings were discovered, arranged in a U-shape. These were determined to be the administrative buildings associated with a shōen from the early Heian period. Artifacts included pottery, wooden tags, bottles, lacquerware, inkstones, and other items. A stream meandered through the building group, which was surrounded by a moat. The ruins of a settlement were also found 300 meters to the east. Historical records indicate that the great temple of Tōdai-ji in Nara had such an estate in Etchū Province during the early Heian period.

The area is preserved as a park with concrete posts marking the locations of building foundations. Excavated items are on display at the adjacent Nanto City Buried Cultural Property Center (南砺市埋蔵文化財センター, Nantoshi maizō bunkazai sentā), a three-story museum which opened in 1973 to preserve and display artifacts excavated from the Takase ruins and other ruins in Nanto City, as well as the folk historical materials of the region. The site is about a 10-minute walk from the "Takase Jinja Mae" bus stop on the Kaetsuno Bus from Fukuno Station on the JR West Johana Line.

== See also ==
- List of Historic Sites of Japan (Toyama)
