= Sakuradani Kofun =

Sakuradani Kofun Cluster
- 桜谷古墳群 (Japanese)
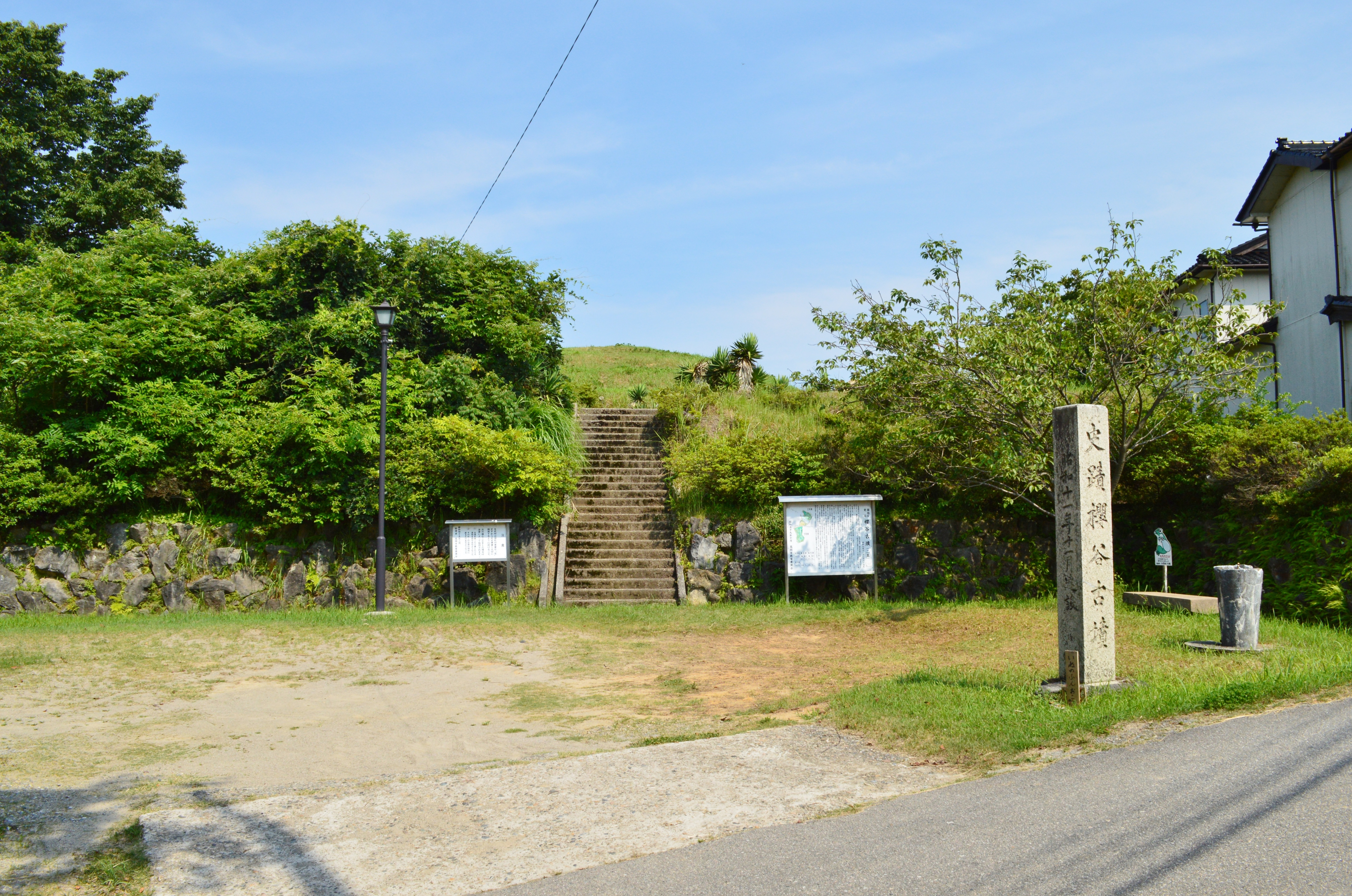
- Sakuradani Kofun No.2

- Shimofunazuka Kofun Sakuradani Kofun (Japan)
- 36°48′59.28″N 137°1′51.82″E
- Type: kofun
- Periods: Kofun period
- Location: Takaoka, Toyama, Japan
- Region: Hokuriku region

History
- Built: 5th century AD

Site notes
- Public access: Yes

The Sakuradani Kofun Cluster (桜谷古墳群, Sakuradani Kofun-gun) is a group of kofun burial mounds located in the Ōta neighborhood of the city of Takaoka, Toyama in the Hokuriku region of Japan. Two of the tumuli were designated as a National Historic Site of Japan in 1934.

== Overview ==
The Sakuradani Kofun Cluster of kofun is located on the margin of a hill at the base of Mount Futagami overlooking Toyama Bay in northwestern Toyama Prefecture. The site consisted of a (zenpō-kōen-fun (前方後円墳)) tumuli (No.1), which is shaped like a keyhole, having one square end and one circular end, when viewed from above and a scallop-shaped (hotategaigata-kofun (帆立貝型古墳)) tumuli (No.2) and ten or more smaller dome-shaped (empun (円墳)) tumuli. The first was discovered in 1918 when a tree was being planted at a local Shinto shrine, and nine more were discovered by 1924. Tombs No.1 and No.2 have not been surveyed internally in detail, but are presumed to date from the beginning of the fifth century in the late Kofun period.

These two tombs were protected as a National Historic Site since 1934; however, the remaining tombs were destroyed when the area was developed for agricultural land after World War II.

In 1976, one more dome-shaped tumulus and two box-shaped stone sarcophagus were discovered during the construction of a prefectural road. However, during this same construction work and despite the National Historic Site status, a portion of Tomb No.2 was destroyed.

Sakuradani Kofun cluster
Kofun	Type	Length	Posterior	Anterior	Excavated
No.1	keyhole	62m	35m diameter x 7m height	30m width x 5.45 m height	unexcavated
No.2	keyhole	50m	33m diameter x 6m height	?m width x 1 m height	1923, 1945

Numerous grave goods uncovered during various archaeological excavations, of which a 14-centimeter diameter bronze mirror (possibly of Chinese origin), 13 cylindrical beads, three gold rings, two knives, 17 small beads and a jasper spindle are designated as Important Tangible Cultural Properties of Takaoka City. The mirror is kept at the Tokyo National Museum and other artifacts at the Toyama City Museum. The site is about a 10-minute walk from Amaharashi Station on the JR West Himi Line.

== See also ==
- List of Historic Sites of Japan (Toyama)
