= Nisseki-ji =

Buddhist temple in Toyama Prefecture, Japan

- 日石寺
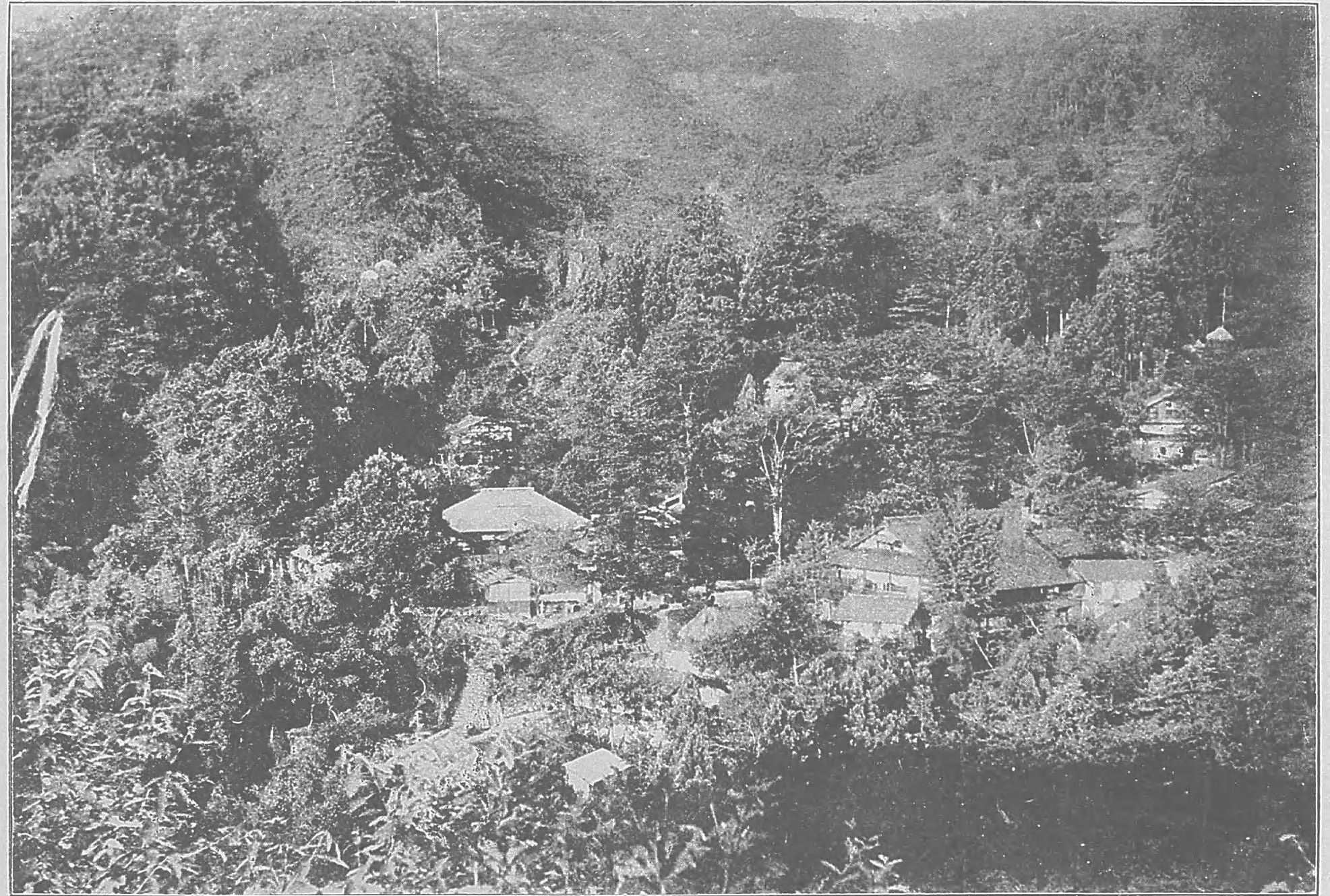
- Nisseki-ji in 1909

- Location within Toyama Prefecture Location within Japan

Religion
- Affiliation: Buddhist
- Deity: Fudō Myō-ō
- Rite: Shingon
- Status: functional

Location
- Location: Kamiichi, Toyama
- Country: Japan
- Interactive map of Nisseki-ji
- Coordinates: 36°39′44″N 137°23′28″E

Architecture
- Founder: Gyōki
- Completed: 725 AD

Website
- Official website

Nisseki-ji (日石寺) is a Buddhist temple in the town of Kamiichi, Toyama Prefecture, Japan. The temple belongs to the Shingon sect of Japanese Buddhism. It is more popularly known by the name of Ōiwa Fudō (大岩不動) after its main image.

== History ==
The temple claims to have been founded in 725 AD by the wandering priest/miracle-worker Gyōki, who carved a 2.8 meter statue of Fudō Myō-ō in bas-relief on a tuff cliff-face. While there are no historical records to back up this claim, the carving itself dates from the late Heian period and is a designated Important Cultural Property in 1974. The statue is part of a group, which includes two of Fudō Myō-ō's assistants Kiṃkara (矜羯羅童子, Kongara dōji) and Ceṭaka (吒迦童子, Seitaka dōji), a seated statue of Amida Nyōrai and a seated Buddhist priest (possibly Gyōki). The latter two statues may have been added at a later date. The Fudō Myō-ō is 2.8 meters high and remains in good very preservation as it have been protected by a building for most of history. The temple was connected with worship of the sacred mountain Mount Tateyama and at one point had 21 subsidiaries and 60 chapels. The Fudō-dō was destroyed by a windstorm in 1335, by a fire set by troops of the Uesugi clan during the late Muromachi period and again by a tree in 1967.

In 1930, the carvings were designated a National Historic Site of Japan in 1934. The temple's Sanmon and three-story pagoda are important cultural properties of Kamiichi town. The temple also has a waterfall which flows in six streams, which is used by practitioners of Shugendō for ritual purification.

== See also ==
- List of Historic Sites of Japan (Toyama)
