= Yasuda Castle =

Sengoku period castle located in Honshu

- 安田城
- Toyama, Toyama Prefecture, Japan
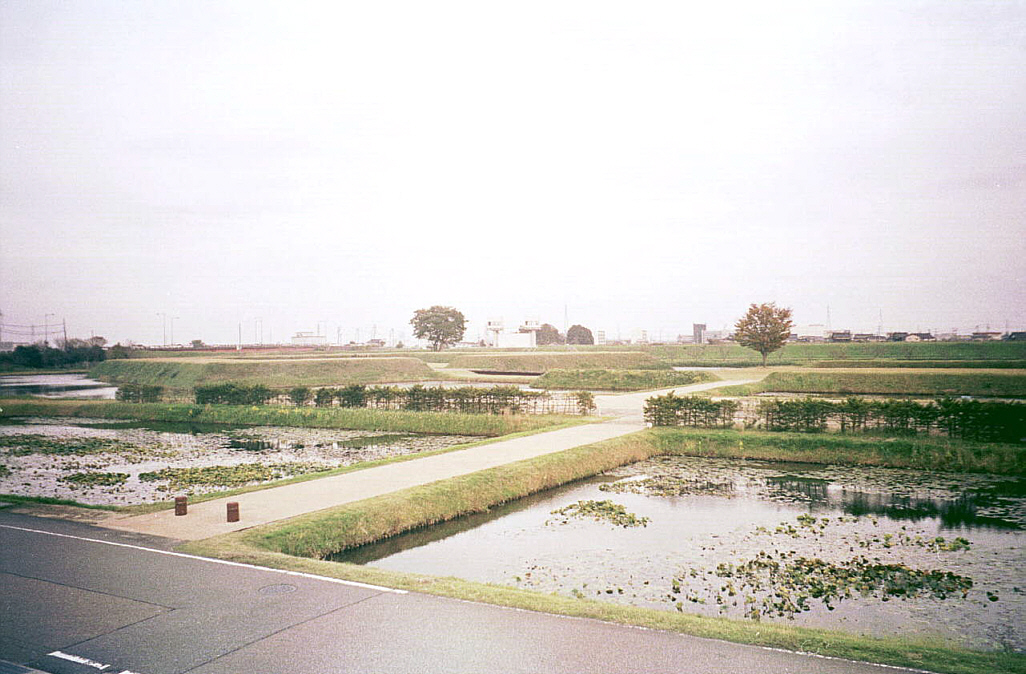
- restored moats of Yasuda Castle

Site information
- Type: flatland-style Japanese castle
- Open to the public: yes
- Condition: ruins

Location
- Yasuda Castle Yasuda Castle (Japan)
- Coordinates: 36°40′49″N 137°9′39″E

Site history
- Built by: Maeda Toshiie (?)
- In use: Sengoku period
- Demolished: c.1590

Yasuda Castle (安田城, Yasuda-jō) was a Sengoku period flatland-style Japanese castle located in the Fuchu neighborhood of the city of Toyama, Toyama Prefecture in the Hokuriku region of Honshu, Japan. The ruins have been protected as a National Historic Site since 1981.

== Background ==
Yasuda Castle is located on the western bank of the Ida River, a tributary of Jinzū River, on the site of the Kureha hills, which divides Etchū Province between the Toyama and Takaoka regions. The castle consist of three areas. The inner bailey is approximately 80 meters square and was surrounded by a two-meter clay rampart. Given its small size and secure location, it was intended to serve as the commander's residence. The inner bailey is connected to a secondary bailey, which apparently was used to store military supplies. As the castle faced its enemy to the west, the western side is further protected by a large kuruwa enclosure. The total size of the caste was thus approximately 200 meters in length by 150 meters in width.

== History ==
The actual foundation of Yasuda Castle is not certain. During the 16th century, the surrounding area was contested between the local Jinbō clan, the Uesugi clan and followers of the Ikkō-ikki movement. Approximately five kilometers north of Yasuda Castle was Shiratori Castle, which was part of the outer defences of Toyama, then under the control of the warlord Sassa Narimasa. In 1585, when Toyotomi Hideyoshi launched his invasion of Etchū Province, he expanded Yasuda Castle to serve as a temporary field headquarters for the Toyotomi army. Okajima Kazuyoshi, one of Maeda Toshiie's retainers, was appointed castellan; however, faced with overwhelming odds, Sassa Narimasa surrendered Toyama after only a week, and Yasuda Castle was never used in battle.

Following these events, Etchū Province was awarded to Maeda Toshiie, who appointed a magistrate based at Yasuda Castle. After the construction of Kanazawa Castle, Yasuda Castle was abandoned. Field headquarters such as Yasuda Castle normally disappear completely shortly after they are abandoned; however, due to the geography of the site, the outlines of the moats and clay ramparts were preserved.

== Current situation ==
All of the structures of Yasuda Castle have long been lost and by the modern period, the moats had been filled in and much of the site was covered by rice paddy. In the late 1960s, the site was targeted for redevelopment, and in 1977 to 1978, archaeologists found the outlines of the moats and ramparts, and confirmed that the layout matched that of a map which is preserved in the Kanazawa City Library. The area received protection from development in 1981 with its designation as a National Historic Site. From 1990 to 1994, the moats were restored and the site was opened as a public park with some excavated items on display at the nearby Yasuda Castle Ruins Museum (安田城跡資料館, Yasuda-jō ato shirokan).

== See also ==
- List of Historic Sites of Japan (Toyama)
