= Kaetsu border castle ruins =

Ruin in Toyama Prefecture, Japan

Kanetsu border castle ruins
- 加越国境城跡群
- Kanazawa, Ishikawa / Oyabe, Toyama, Japan
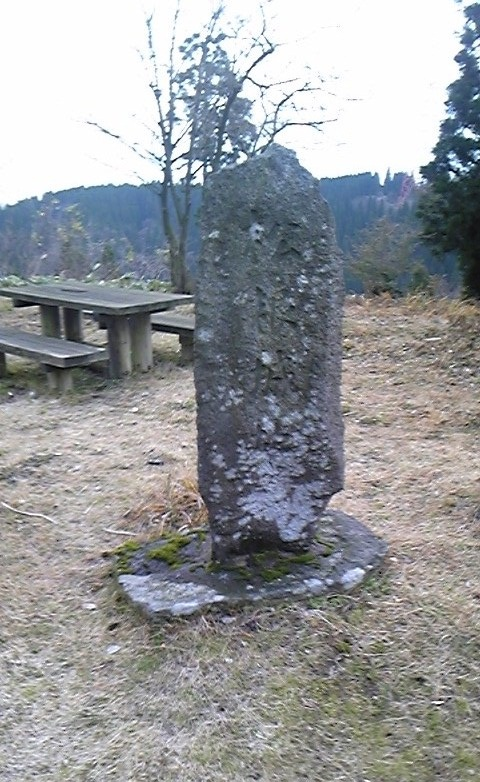

Site information
- Type: Japanese castle
- Open to the public: yes
- Condition: ruins

Location
- Matsune Castle ruins Kanetsu border castle ruins (Japan)
- Coordinates: 36°36′58″N 136°47′00″E

Site history
- Built: 1584
- In use: Sengoku period
- Demolished: 1585

The Kanetsu Border Castle ruins (加越国境城跡群及び道 切山城跡 松根城跡 小原越, Kaetsu-kuni-zakai shiro ato-gun oyobi michi Kiriyama-jō ato Matsune-jō ato Ohara-goe) is the name for a group of ruined castles and sites along the border of what is now Ishikawa Prefecture and Toyama Prefecture connected with the Sengoku period conflict between the warlords Maeda Toshiie and Sassa Narimasa. The ruins were designated a National Historic Site in 2015.

== Historical background ==
In 1582, Toyotomi Hideyoshi defeated Akechi Mitsuhide and became the successor to the assassinated Oda Nobunaga, who had been killed in the Honnō-ji Incident. Hideyoshi then destroyed Nobunaga's general Shibata Katsuie at the Battle of Shizugatake the following year. In 1584, he fought a largely inconclusive series of battles against a coalition of Oda Nobukatsu and Tokugawa Ieyasu called the Battle of Komaki and Nagakute. At the end of 1584, the warlord of Etchū Province, Sassa Narimasa declared fealty to Tokugawa Ieyasu, which placed him at odds with Hideyoshi's senior retainer, Maeda Toshiie, who was based in neighboring Kaga Province. Both sides fortified the border between their respective provinces and clashed on a frequent basis, with Sassa at one point invading Noto Province and taking Suemori Castle from the Maeda. Eventually, in 1585 Hideyoshi marched with an army to invest Etchū Province, laying siege to Tomiyama Castle and Sassa Narimasa was forced to surrender.

== Overview ==
The National Historic Site designation covers Kiriyama Castle (切山城), which was built by the Maeda and Matsune Castle (松根城), which was built by Sassa, and the Obara Pass (小原越) on the mountain road connecting these two castles. In an archaeological excavation undertaken before the National Historic Site designation, remnants of dry moats, fortified gates, earthen ramparts and musket balls made of lead from the Sonto mine in Thailand were found at both castle sites, and the old route of the road through the pass was identified. Traces of where the pass itself had been rendered impassible by a deep 25-meter wide cutting were also found.

The ruins of Kiriyama Castle are located at the top of a hill at an elevation of 139 meters between the Morishita River and its tributaries, the Kiriyama River and the Shimizu Tanigawa River. The castle area extended for about 200 meters east-to-west and 250 meters north-to-south, and excavation surveys have the remains of enclosures with dry moats, ramparts and fortified gates. The scale of moat at the eastern end of the castle is large, and it is highly possible that the castle was built or renovated in preparation for an attack from the Etchū side. The road running along the southern edge of the castle is a side road of the Hokkoku Kaidō highway and leads to Matsune Castle.

The ruins of Matsune Castle are located at the highest point of the Tonamiyama hill, which straddles the border between Kaga and Etchū. It is of uncertain foundation, and may have been the site of an earlier military camp under Kiso Yoshinaka in 1183. A fortification existed in the 15th century and was a base for the Ikkō-ikki uprising. Following the Battle of Komaki and Nagakute, the castle was seized by the forces of Sassa Narimasa and was quickly modernized. The Sassa army was also responsible for blocking the Obara Pass with its 25-meter cutting. The castle measured 140 meters east-to-west and about 440 meters north-to-south. During Hideyoshi's invasion of Etchū, the castle was taken by Murai Naganori, a vassal of Maeda Toshiie. It later became part of the territories of Kaga Domain under the Tokugawa shogunate and was abolished in 1615 under the shogunate's "One-country - One Castle" decree.

== See also ==
- List of Historic Sites of Japan (Toyama)
- List of Historic Sites of Japan (Ishikawa)
