= Takaoka Castle =

Castle in Japan

- 高岡城
- 1-9 Kojo, Takaoka, Toyama 933-0044 Japan
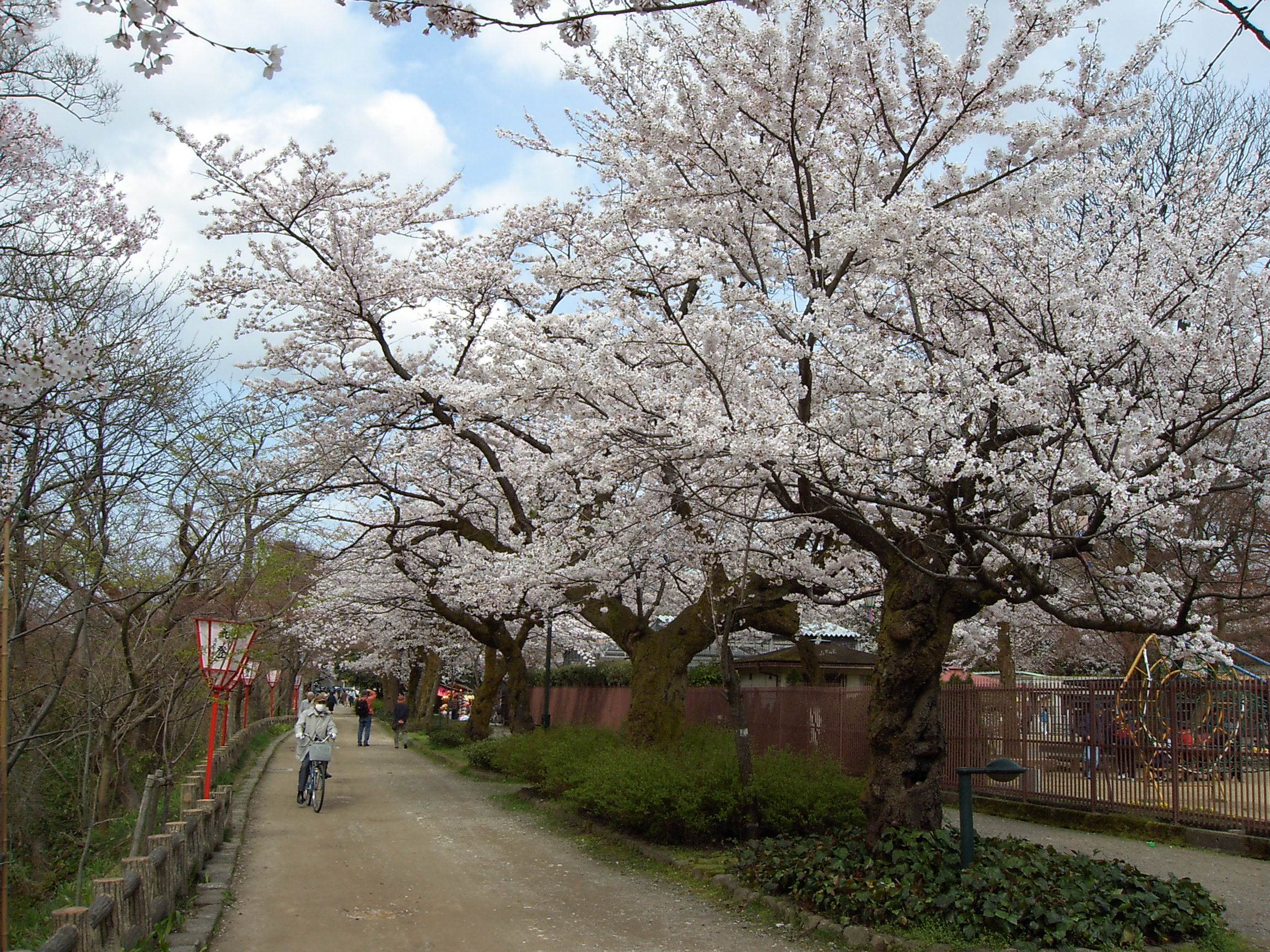
- The site of Takaoka castle is now Takaoka Kojō park, which has many cherry trees.

Site information
- Type: flatland-style Japanese castle
- Open to the public: yes
- Condition: Ruins

Location
- Coordinates: 36.7492°N 137.0206°E

Site history
- Built: 1609
- Built by: Maeda clan
- In use: Edo period
- Demolished: 1615

Takaoka Castle (高岡城, Takaoka-jō) was a flatland-style Japanese castle in what is now the city of Takaoka, Toyama Japan. It was originally constructed in 1609, and was only used for a few years before being dismantled. The site of its ruins is now a park. The castle is designated one of Japan's Top 100 Castles by the Japanese Castle Foundation. The ruins are protected as a National Historic Site.

== Background ==
Takaoka Castle is located at the center of what is now the city of Takaoka, in the western part of Etchū Province. The Takaoka area was considered the center of Etchū Province until the Muromachi period, as it was the location of the provincial capital and was an important junction point for the Hokuriku kaidō highway and the road to Noto Province. The area came under the control of the Maeda clan under Maeda Toshiie of Kaga Domain of the Tokugawa shogunate from the early Edo period.

== Design ==
Takaoka Castle was a rectangle of 400 meters long and 200 meters wide. The castle originally had five enclosures, all surrounded by a single, or in places, a double, moat. The inner bailey was 200 meters square and located at the middle part of western edge, surrounded by moats, with smaller enclosures to the north, east and south. As the west side of the castle was a marsh, and there was no need for a secondary enclosure on this side. Each enclosure was guarded by stone walls and a wide moat. The design was influenced by the Jurakudai palace of Toyotomi Hideyoshi in Kyoto, as the small secondary enclosures were poorly designed for defence, but were instead intended to enhance the prestige of the inner bailey as well as to provide beautiful views along the moats. It is uncertain if a tenshu, or even if yagura watchtowers were ever built.

== History ==
Maeda Toshinaga, the son of Maeda Toshiie and second daimyō of Kaga Domain retired in 1605 at the age of 43, and moved from Kanazawa Castle to Toyama Castle. The reason for his early retirement is uncertain, but one reason could have been that he wanted to ensure the succession of the Maeda clan by turning the position of daimyō to his younger brother Maeda Toshitsune, who was married to the daughter of shōgun Tokugawa Hidetada. Toyama Castle burned down in 1609, and Toshinaga relocated to Uozu Castle while waiting for permission from the shogunate to build a new castle at a place named Sekino. The design of the castle was done by Takayama Ukon, who had been exiled to Kaga Province by Toyotomi Hideyoshi. When the castle was completed, the location was renamed "Takaoka".

Toshinaga developed a castle town surrounding the new castle: however, in 1614 Toshinaga died due to illness, and the Tokugawa shogunate proclaimed the Ikkoku-ichijo (一国一城, "One Castle Per Province") rule the following year, resulting in the destruction of the castle. Later the Maeda clan rebuilt Toyama Castle as the administrative center of Etchū Province, but kept the site of Takaoka Castle as a location for warehouses to store tax rice for Kaga Domain. Within the castle grounds were also a sake brewery, salt warehouses, a gunpowder factory, and the offices of the local governor, the Takaoka Machi-bugyō. Many of these buildings were destroyed in a fire in 1821. After the Meiji restoration, the government district office for Imizu District, Toyama was built in the castle site.

== Current situation ==
The ruins of the castle are mainly just remnants of its stone ramparts. The ruins sit at the Takaoka Kojō Park (高岡古城公園, Takaoka Kojō Kōen), which was established in 1875, became a Toyama Prefectural park in 1967. The park contains a Shinto shrine, the Imizu Jinja, which is the ichinomiya of Etchū Province, the Takaoka Municipal Museum, Takaoka Public Hall and a zoo. The park's sakura is the city's major location for cherry blossom viewing. The castle ruins are located about ten minutes on foot from Takaoka Station on the JR West Hokuriku Main Line, or a five-minute walk from Etchū-Nakagawa Station on the Himi Line.

== See also ==
- List of Historic Sites of Japan (Toyama)

== Literature ==
- De Lange, William (2021). An Encyclopedia of Japanese Castles. Groningen: Toyo Press. pp. 600 pages. ISBN 978-9492722300.
- Schmorleitz, Morton S. (1974). Castles in Japan. Tokyo: Charles E. Tuttle Co. pp. 144–145. ISBN 0-8048-1102-4.
- Motoo, Hinago (1986). Japanese Castles. Tokyo: Kodansha. p. 200 pages. ISBN 0-87011-766-1.
- Mitchelhill, Jennifer (2004). Castles of the Samurai: Power and Beauty. Tokyo: Kodansha. p. 112 pages. ISBN 4-7700-2954-3.
- Turnbull, Stephen (2003). Japanese Castles 1540–1640. Osprey Publishing. p. 64 pages. ISBN 1-84176-429-9.
