= Shōmyō Falls =

Coordinates: 36°34′31″N 137°31′24″E

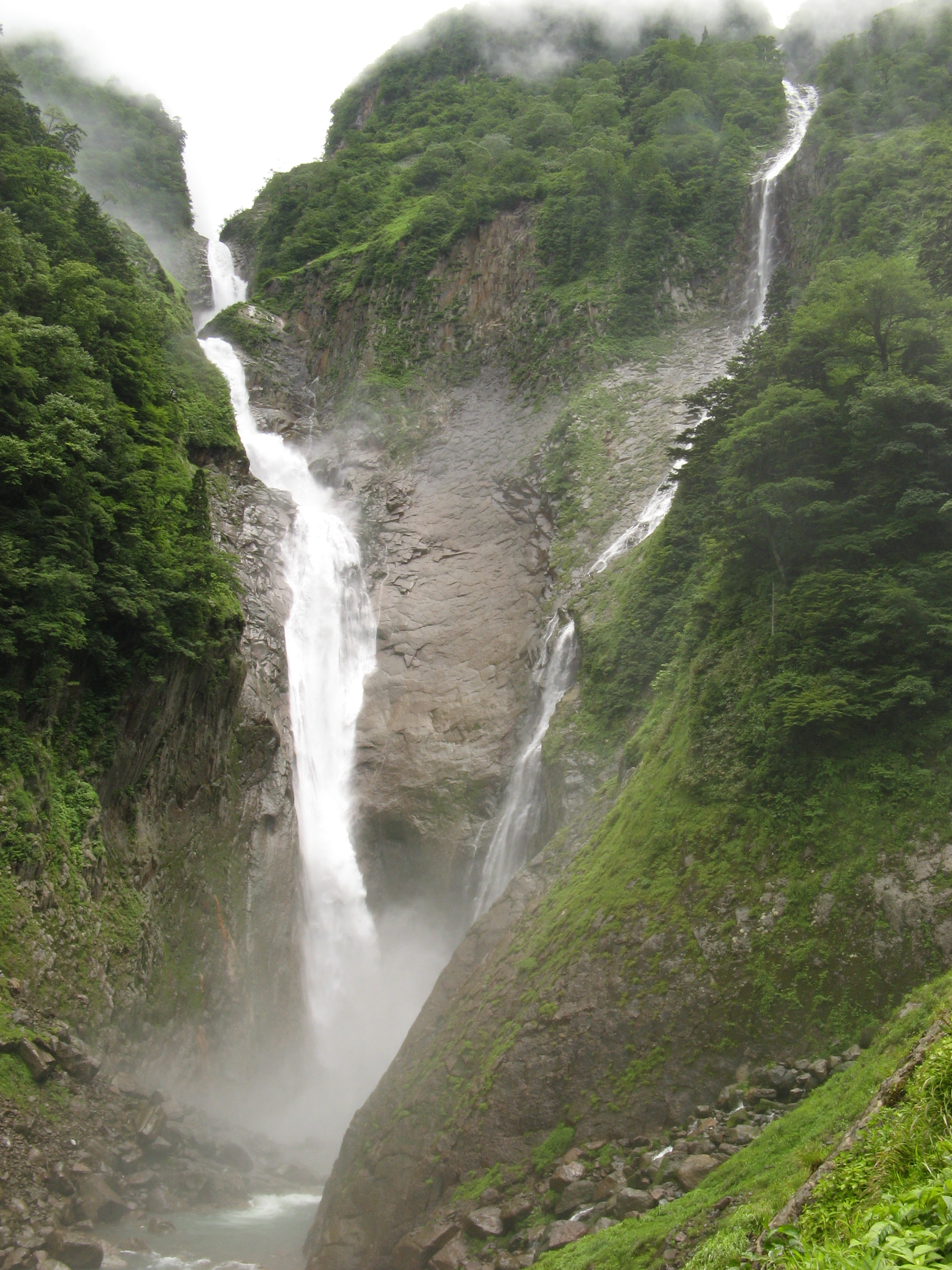
- Shōmyō Falls (left) and Hannoki Falls (right)

- Location within Japan
- Location: Tateyama, Toyama Prefecture, Japan
- Type: multi-step
- Total height: 350 m (1,150 ft)
- Number of drops: 4

Shōmyō Falls (称名滝, Shōmyō-daki) are located in the town of Tateyama, Toyama Prefecture, Japan. It is the highest waterfall in Japan at 350 m (1,150 ft). The falls have four stages: the first 70 m (230 ft), the second 58 m (190 ft), the third 96 m (315 ft) and the last 126 m (413 ft) high. The greatest amount of water flows over the falls in the early to mid-summer, when the snow in the Tateyama Mountains melts.

Its neighbor, Hannoki Falls, is usually considered the seasonably tallest at 497 m (1,631 ft), as it only has water from April to July when the snow on the Midagahara plateau melts. As seen in the photo, Hannoki and Shōmyō falls are twin waterfalls that almost face each other.

== See also ==
- List of waterfalls
- List of waterfalls in Japan
