= Himi =

Himi 氷見市
- City
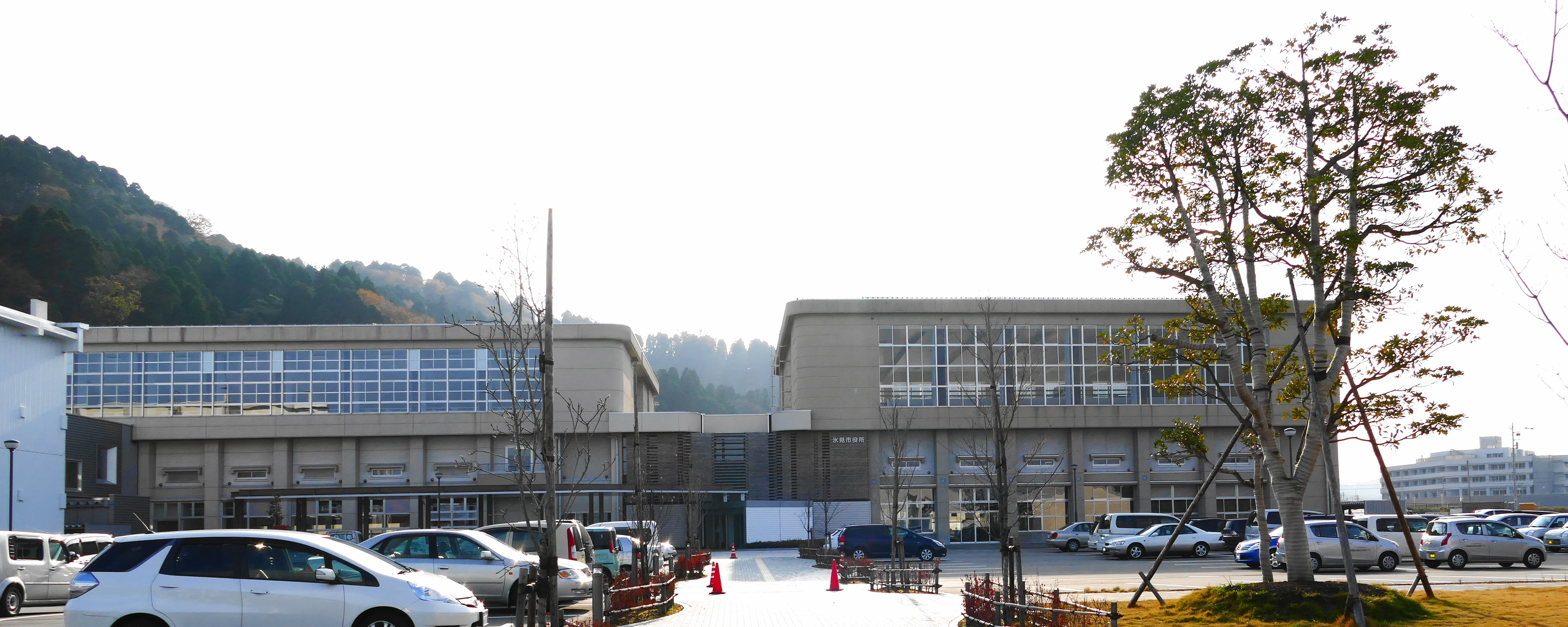
- Himi City Hall

- Flag Seal

- Location of Himi in Toyama Prefecture

- Coordinates: 36°51′24″N 136°58′23″E
- Country: Japan
- Region: Chūbu (Hokuriku)
- Prefecture: Toyama

Government
  - Mayor: Masayuki Hayashi

Area
  - Total: 230.56 km^{2} (89.02 sq mi)

Population (October 1, 2020)
  - Total: 43,995
  - Density: 190.9/km^{2} (494/sq mi)
- Time zone: UTC+09:00 (JST)
- Postal code: 935-8686
- Phone number: 0766-74-8100
- Address: 1060 Kurakawa, Himi-shi, Toyama-ken
- Climate: Cfa
- Website: Official website
- Symbols
- Bird: Motacilla
- Flower: Chrysanthemum
- Tree: Osmanthus

Himi (氷見市, Himi-shi) is a city in western Toyama Prefecture, Japan. As of 1 March 2018, the city had an estimated population of 48,275 in 17,632 households, and a population density of 210 persons per km^{2}. Its total area is 230.56 square kilometres (89.02 sq mi). Himi is known primarily for its commercial fishing industry. The city was founded on August 1, 1952.

== Geography ==
Himi is in the far northwestern Toyama Prefecture, and is bordered by Ishikawa Prefecture (the Noto Peninsula to the west and north, and the Sea of Japan (Toyama Bay) to the east. Much of the area is a dispersed settlement typical of this region of Japan.

=== Surrounding municipalities ===
- Ishikawa Prefecture
  - Hakui
  - Hōdatsushimizu
  - Nakanoto
  - Nanao
- Toyama Prefecture
  - Takaoka

=== Climate ===
Himi has a humid subtropical climate (Köppen Cfa) characterized by mild summers and cold winters with heavy snowfall. The average annual temperature in Himi is 13.9 °C. The average annual rainfall is 2409 mm with September as the wettest month. The temperatures are highest on average in August, at around 26.4 °C, and lowest in January, at around 2.8 °C.

Climate data for Himi (1991−2020 normals, extremes 1978−present)
Month	Jan	Feb	Mar	Apr	May	Jun	Jul	Aug	Sep	Oct	Nov	Dec	Year
Record high °C (°F)	17.5 (63.5)	22.3 (72.1)	28.6 (83.5)	30.3 (86.5)	31.7 (89.1)	35.6 (96.1)	37.3 (99.1)	37.4 (99.3)	36.5 (97.7)	32.3 (90.1)	27.1 (80.8)	22.8 (73.0)	37.4 (99.3)
Mean daily maximum °C (°F)	6.0 (42.8)	6.9 (44.4)	10.9 (51.6)	16.3 (61.3)	21.2 (70.2)	24.4 (75.9)	28.7 (83.7)	30.4 (86.7)	26.3 (79.3)	21.0 (69.8)	15.1 (59.2)	9.1 (48.4)	18.0 (64.4)
Daily mean °C (°F)	2.4 (36.3)	2.6 (36.7)	5.8 (42.4)	10.8 (51.4)	16.0 (60.8)	20.2 (68.4)	24.5 (76.1)	25.8 (78.4)	21.8 (71.2)	16.0 (60.8)	10.2 (50.4)	5.0 (41.0)	13.4 (56.2)
Mean daily minimum °C (°F)	−0.7 (30.7)	−1.1 (30.0)	1.1 (34.0)	5.6 (42.1)	11.3 (52.3)	16.5 (61.7)	21.1 (70.0)	22.2 (72.0)	18.0 (64.4)	11.6 (52.9)	5.8 (42.4)	1.5 (34.7)	9.4 (48.9)
Record low °C (°F)	−9.6 (14.7)	−10.6 (12.9)	−9.3 (15.3)	−3.4 (25.9)	2.1 (35.8)	7.7 (45.9)	12.8 (55.0)	12.8 (55.0)	7.4 (45.3)	0.5 (32.9)	−1.7 (28.9)	−7.0 (19.4)	−10.6 (12.9)
Average precipitation mm (inches)	242.3 (9.54)	143.4 (5.65)	135.6 (5.34)	116.5 (4.59)	110.2 (4.34)	156.5 (6.16)	229.3 (9.03)	184.5 (7.26)	192.2 (7.57)	142.3 (5.60)	217.3 (8.56)	274.4 (10.80)	2,156.5 (84.90)
Average snowfall cm (inches)	111 (44)	72 (28)	11 (4.3)	1 (0.4)	0 (0)	0 (0)	0 (0)	0 (0)	0 (0)	0 (0)	0 (0)	46 (18)	239 (94)
Average precipitation days (≥ 1.0 mm)	23.7	18.2	16.5	12.2	10.4	10.5	12.6	9.5	12.5	12.9	17.0	22.8	178.8
Average snowy days (≥ 3 cm)	10.5	7.6	1.3	0.1	0	0	0	0	0	0	0.1	4.7	24.3
Mean monthly sunshine hours	59.5	89.7	145.6	187.3	213.2	162.9	163.9	213.1	149.5	150.0	106.5	67.0	1,708.1
Source: Japan Meteorological Agency

== Demographics ==
Per Japanese census data, the population of Himi has declined over the past 40 years.

Historical population
Year	Pop.	±%
1970	60,883	—
1980	62,413	+2.5%
1990	60,766	−2.6%
1995	58,786	−3.3%
2000	56,680	−3.6%
2005	54,495	−3.9%
2010	51,726	−5.1%
2015	47,992	−7.2%
2020	43,950	−8.4%
2025	39,149	−10.9%
Himi population statistics

== History ==
The area of present-day Himi was part of ancient Etchū Province. The town of Himi was created within Imizu District, Toyama with the establishment of the municipalities system on April 1, 1889. Izumi District was divided on March 29, 1896 into Izumi District and Himi District. The town annexed the neighboring villages of Kanno and Inazumi in 1940, and the villages of Goishi, Yashiro, Yokawa in 1952. In 1953, the town further annexed the villages of Kubo, Miyata, Kamijo and Kumanashi. In 1954, Himi annexed the villages of Ao, Yabuta, Unami, Mera, Kume, Kojiro, Junicho, Hayakawa, Fuse, and Busshoji, so that in its final form it encompassed the entire district of Himi with the exception of the village of Ota (which was annexed by Takaoka).

== Government ==
Himi has a mayor-council form of government with a directly elected mayor and a unicameral city legislature of 17 members.

== Education ==
Himi has twelve public elementary schools and five public junior high schools operated by the town government, and one public high school operated by the Toyama Prefectural Board of Education.

== Transportation ==
=== Railway ===
- West Japan Railway Company (JR West) - Himi Line
  - Shimao-Himi

=== Highway ===
- Nōetsu Expressway
- National Route 160
- National Route 415

== Regional specialties ==
- Cold Yellowtail
- Himi Beef
- Himi Buri
- Himi Curry
- Himi Hatomugi Tea
- Himi Iwashi
- Himi Udon
- Kintsuba

== Points of interest ==
- Asahi Shell Mound, a National Historic Site
- Himi Banya
- Himi Seaside Botanical Garden
- Ōzakai Cave Dwelling Site, a National Historic Site
- Shimao Seaside Park
- Yanaidanu-no-Oyama Kofun, a National Historic Site
- Himi City Fureai Sports Center
- Himi Arts and Culture Center
- Fujiko Fujio A Manga World

== Notable People and Media References ==
- Fujiko Fujio (A) - Manga Artist
- Umino Mizuki - former top musumeyaku of Takarazuka Revue's Moon Troupe
- Soukyuu Boys - Manga Series
