= Yayoi pottery =

Ancient pottery of Japan

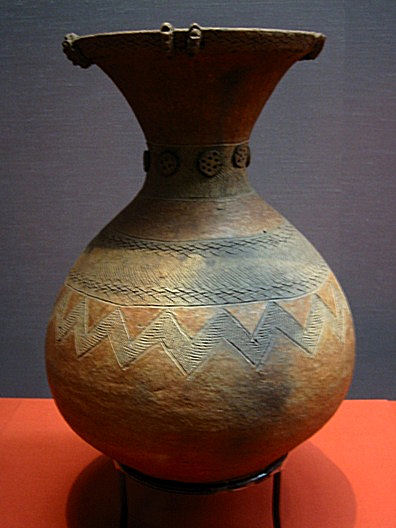
Ceramic jar from the Yayoi period

Yayoi pottery (弥生土器 Yayoi doki) is earthenware pottery produced during the Yayoi period, an Iron Age era in the history of Japan traditionally dated 300 BC to AD 300. The pottery allowed for the identification of the Yayoi period and its primary features such as agriculture and social structure.

== History ==
Distinguishing characteristics of the Yayoi period include the appearance of new pottery styles that distinguishes it from the earlier Jōmon pottery. A point of difference is evident in the way Yayoi pottery is technically superior but artistically less advanced due to the way Jōmon pottery featured greater freedom of design and more variety of shape. It was followed by the Haji pottery of the Kofun period.

There are accounts that cited a relationship between Yayoi pottery and the pseudo-Korean-style Late Mumun pottery. This link is said to be based on hybridization or imitation and demonstrated in the case of the hybrid style of pottery produced in the Neug-To Islands.
