= Jōmon pottery =

Japanese ancient pottery

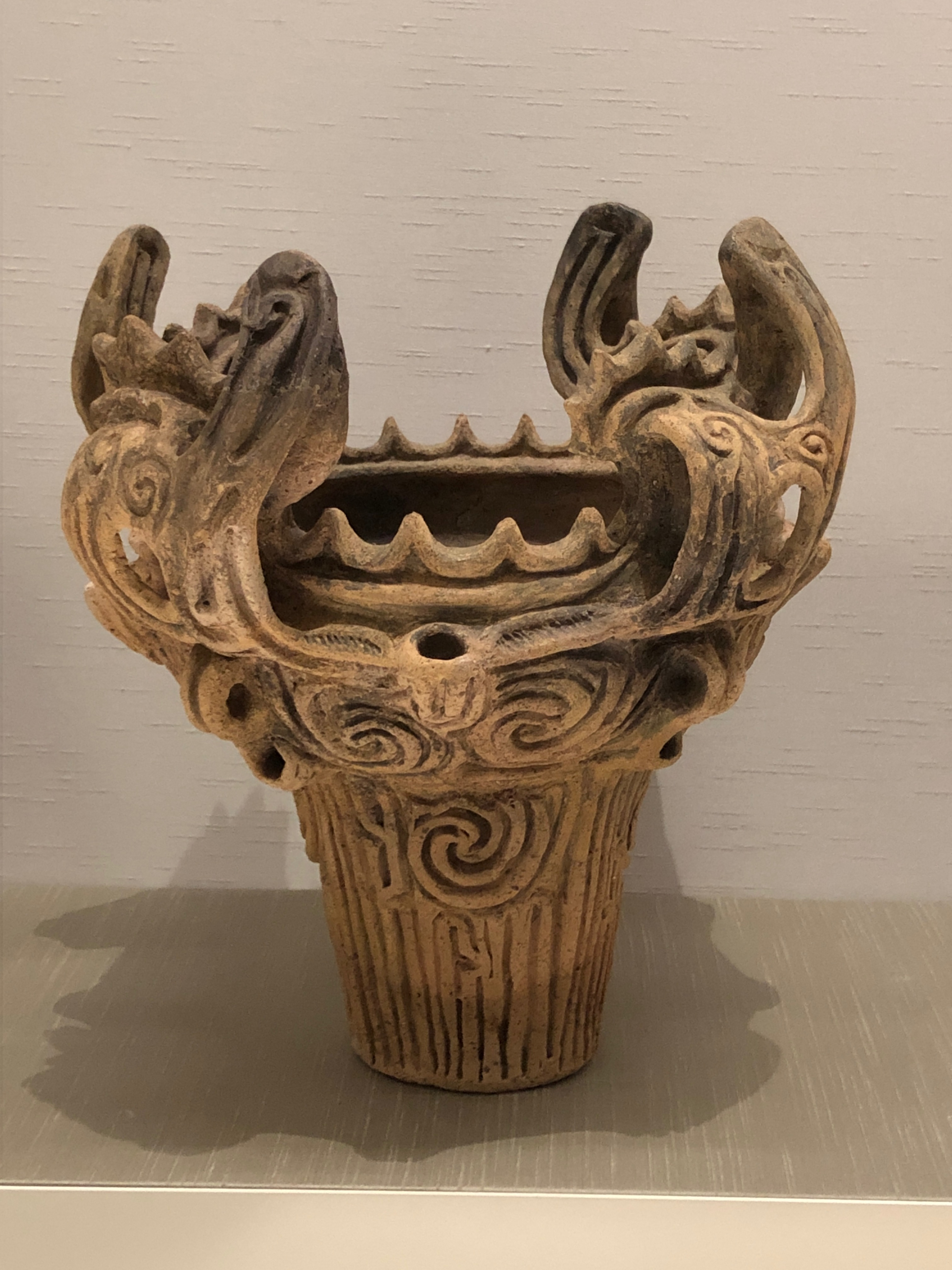
Jomon flame-style pottery, 3,000 BC, excavated at the Iwanohara site, Niigata Prefecture

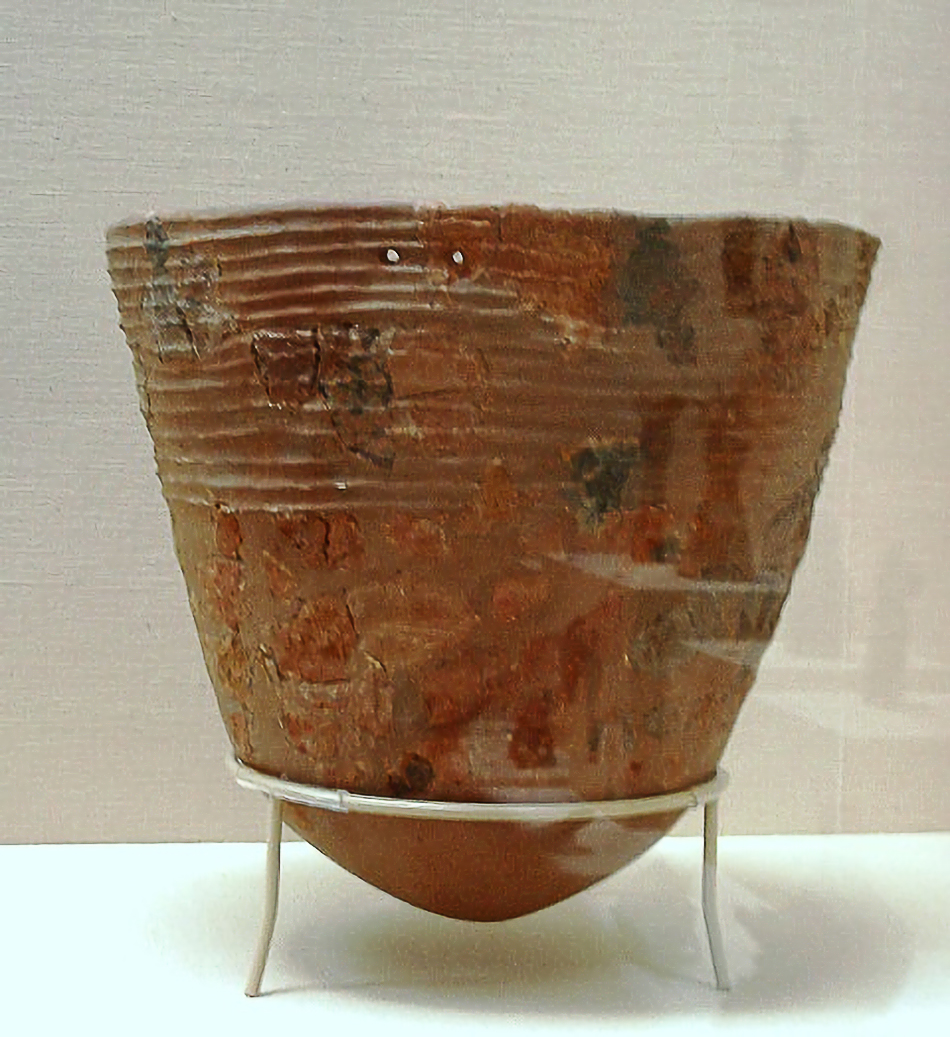
Incipient Jomon rope pottery 10000–8000 BCE

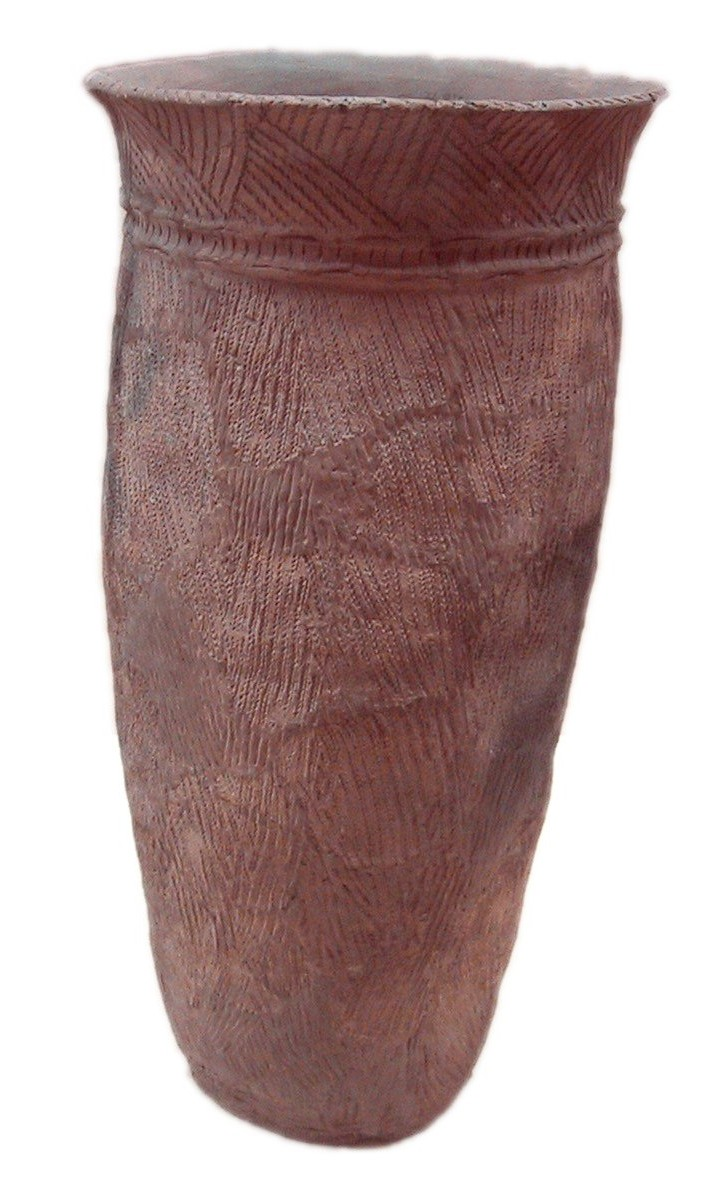
Middle Jomon Period rope pottery 5000–4000 BCE

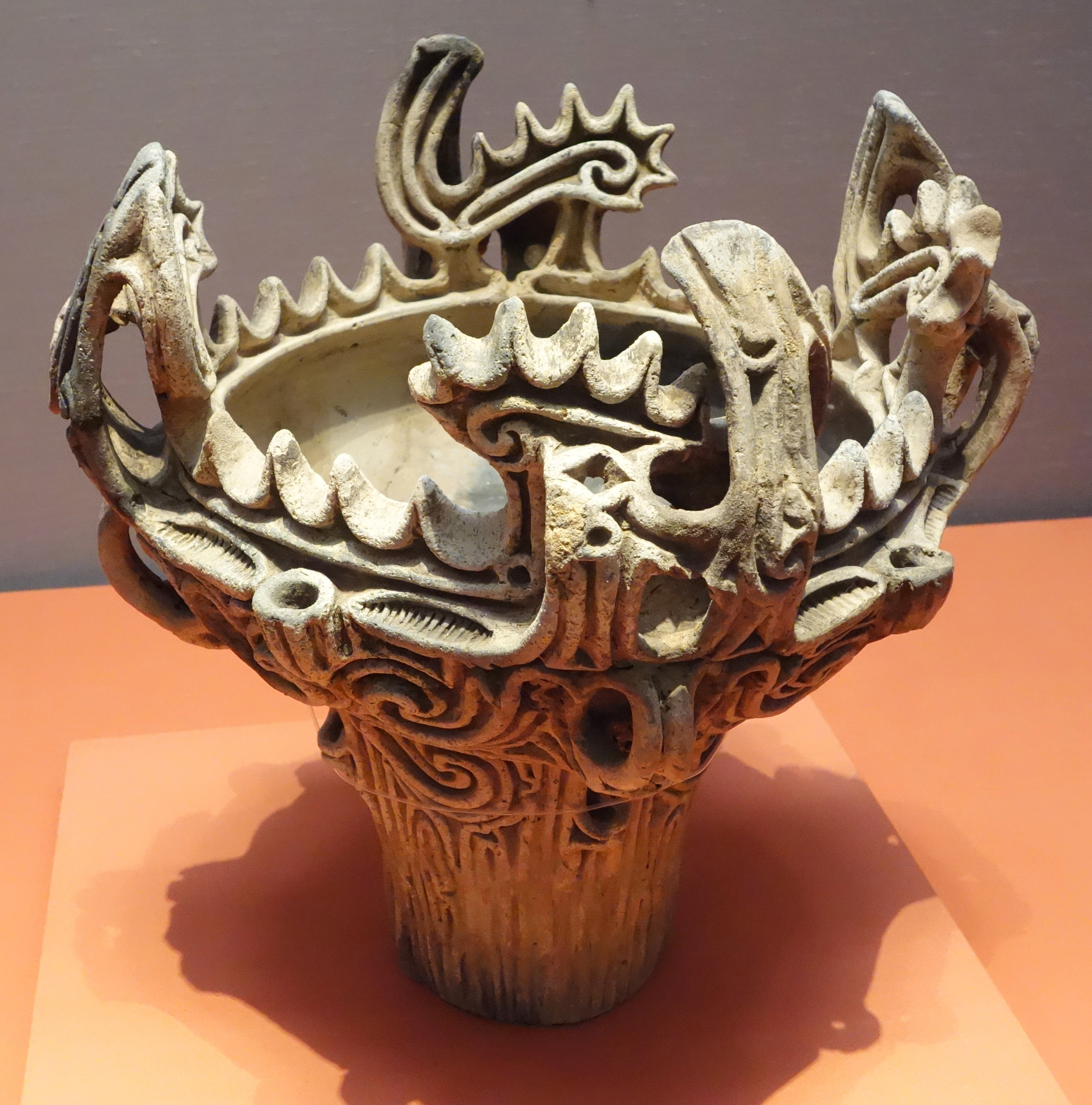
Jomon vessel 3000–2000 BCE, Flame-style Pottery (Flamboyant Ceramic, Kaen-doki)

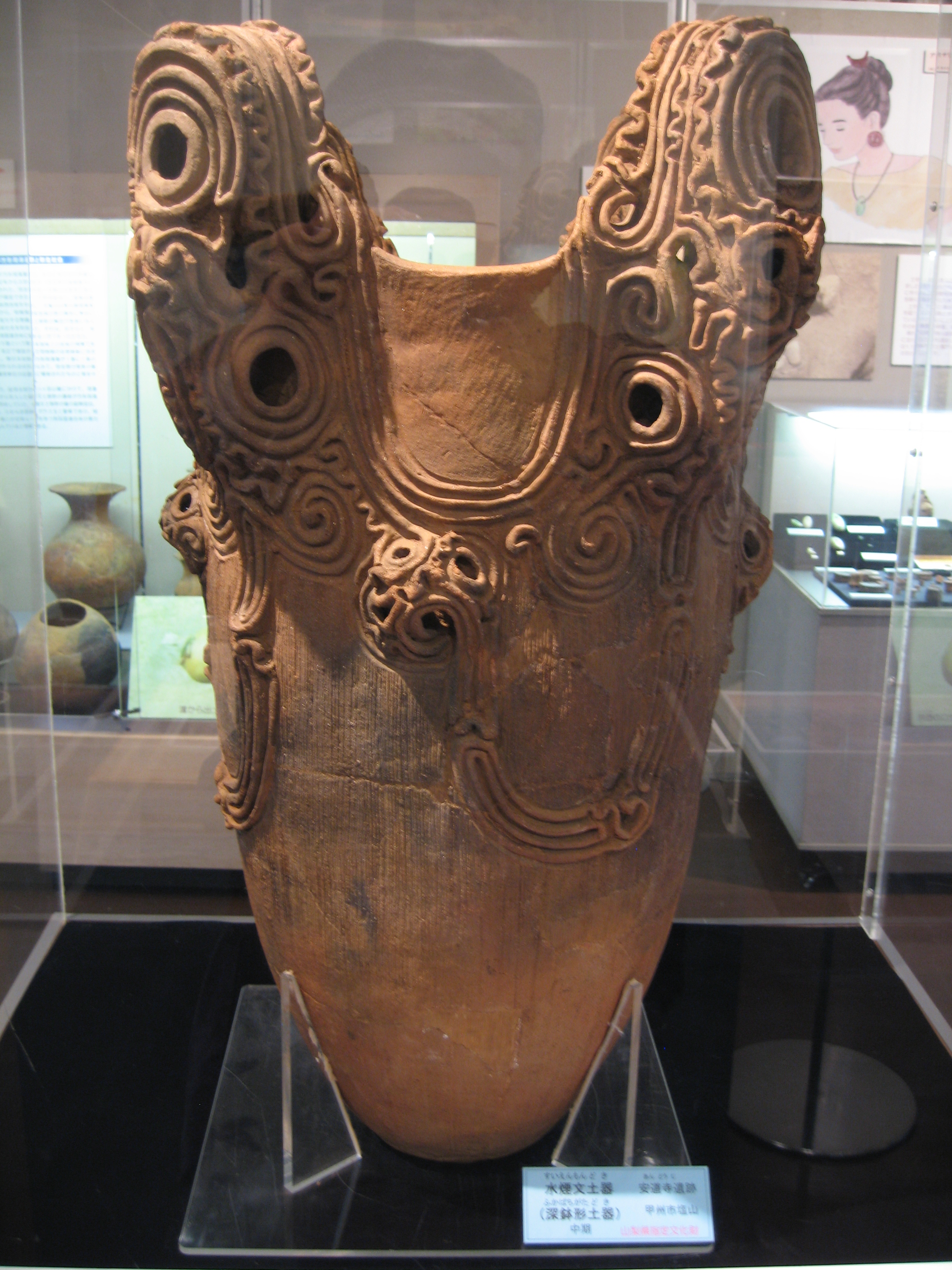
Spray style Jōmon pottery

The Jōmon pottery (縄文土器, Jōmon doki) is a type of ancient earthenware pottery which was made during the Jōmon period in Japan. The term "Jōmon" (縄文) means "rope-patterned" in Japanese, describing the patterns that are pressed into the clay.

== Outline ==
=== Oldest pottery in Japan ===
The pottery vessels crafted in Ancient Japan during the Jōmon period are generally accepted to be the oldest pottery in Japan and among the oldest in the world.

=== Dating ===
Odai Yamamoto I site in Aomori Prefecture currently has the oldest pottery in Japan. Excavations in 1998 uncovered forty-six earthenware fragments which have been dated as early as 14,500 BCE (ca 16,500 BP); this places them among the earliest pottery currently known. This appears to be plain, undecorated pottery. Such a date puts the development of pottery before the warming at the end of the Pleistocene.

'Linear-relief' pottery was also found at Fukui cave Layer III dating to 13,850–12,250 BCE. This site is located in Nagasaki Prefecture, Kyushu. Both linear-relief, and 'nail-impressed' pottery were found at Torihama shell mound, in Fukui prefecture, dating to 12000-11000 BCE.

Bits of pottery discovered in a cave in the northwest coast of modern-day Kyushu date back to as far as 12,700 BCE in radiometric dating tests.

It is believed by many that Jōmon pottery was probably made even earlier than this date. However, due to ambiguity and multiple sources claiming different dates based on different dating techniques, it is difficult to say for sure how far back Jōmon Pottery was made. Some sources claim archaeological discoveries as far back as the 14th millennium BCE.

=== Chronology ===
The Jōmon Period in Ancient Japan lasted until roughly 300 BCE. From there, it is divided into six periods: Incipient Jōmon, from 10,500–8,000 BCE, Earliest Jōmon, from 8,000–5,000 BCE, Early Jōmon, from 5,000–2,500 BCE, Middle Jōmon, from 2,500- 1,500 BCE, Late Jōmon, from 1,500–1,000 BCE, and Final Jōmon, from 1,000–300 BCE. There are over 80 sites in Japan where Incipient Jōmon pottery vessels have been found, but the majority of Jōmon pottery remains come from the later periods.

It was later followed by the Yayoi pottery.

=== Characteristics ===
The majority of Jōmon pottery has rounded bottoms and the vessels are usually small. All of the elaborately decorated vessels, as well as most others, show that the vessels would typically be used to cook food due to the residue and soot found on the pots. Later Jōmon pottery pieces are more elaborate, especially during the Middle Jōmon period, where the rims of pots became much more complex and decorated.

The name Jōmon itself means “rope-patterned”. This refers to the impressions on the surface of the pottery which were created by pressing rope into the clay before it was heated to approximately 600–900 degrees Celsius.

A specific type of clay figurines produced during this period are the dogū.

== See also ==
- Comb Ceramic
- Corded Ware culture, a prehistoric European culture also characterised by pottery with cord and rope impressions
- Emishi people
