= List of cities in Ishikawa Prefecture by population =

The following list sorts all cities (including towns) in the Japanese prefecture of Ishikawa with a population of more than 5,000 according to the 2020 Census. As of October 1, 2020, 19 places fulfill this criterion and are listed here. This list refers only to the population of individual cities, towns and villages within their defined limits, which does not include other municipalities or suburban areas within urban agglomerations.

== List ==
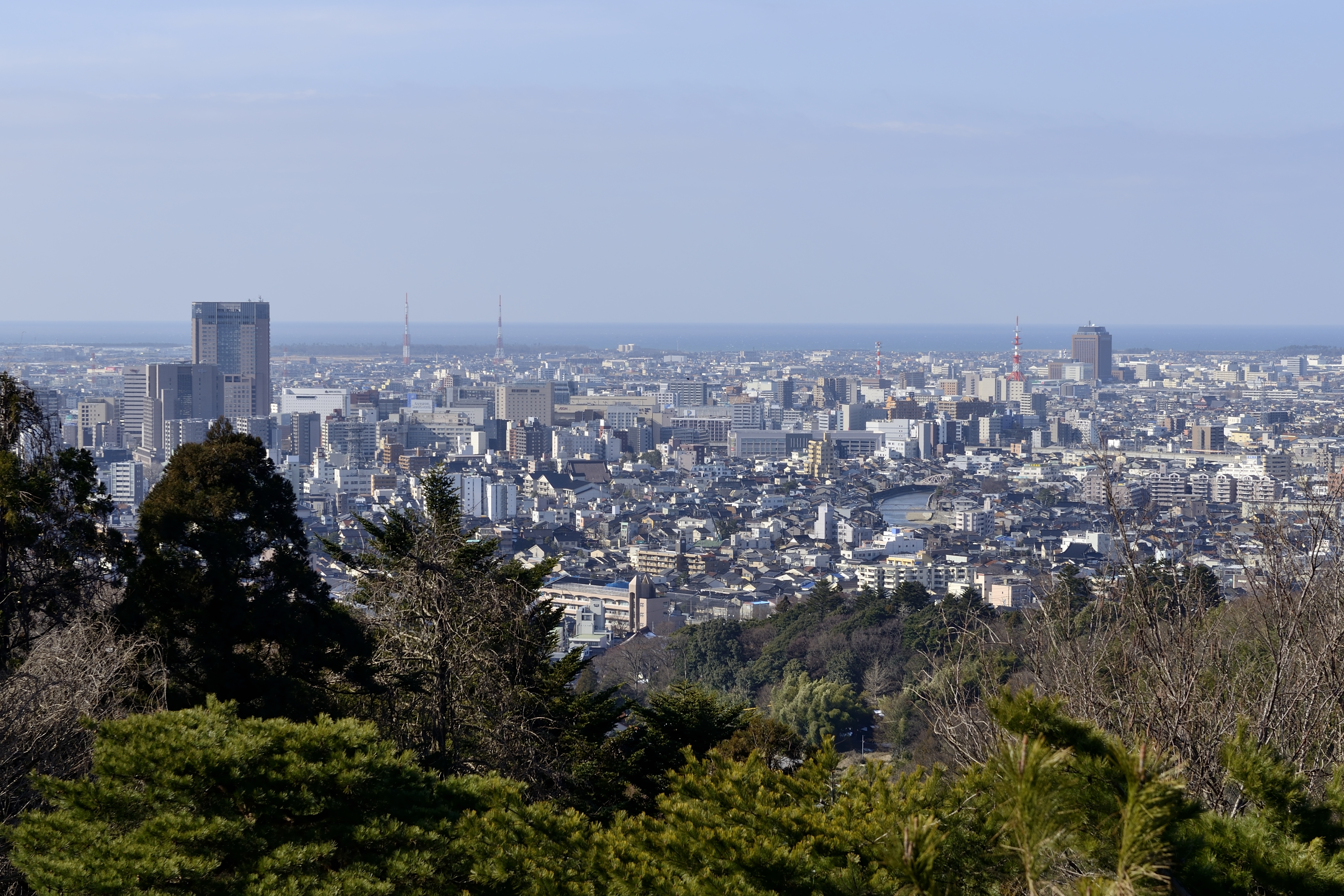
01.Kanazawa

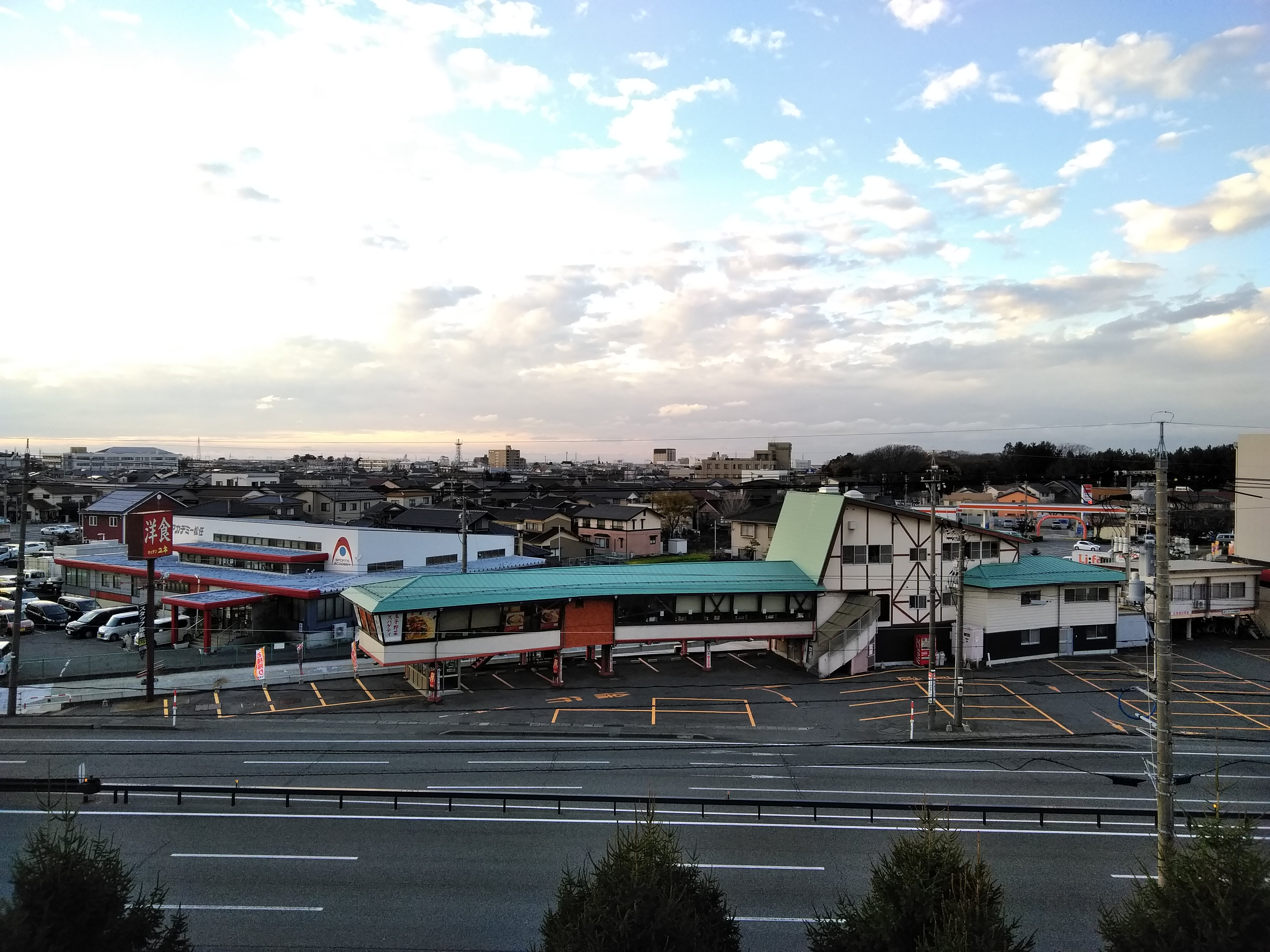
02.Hakusan

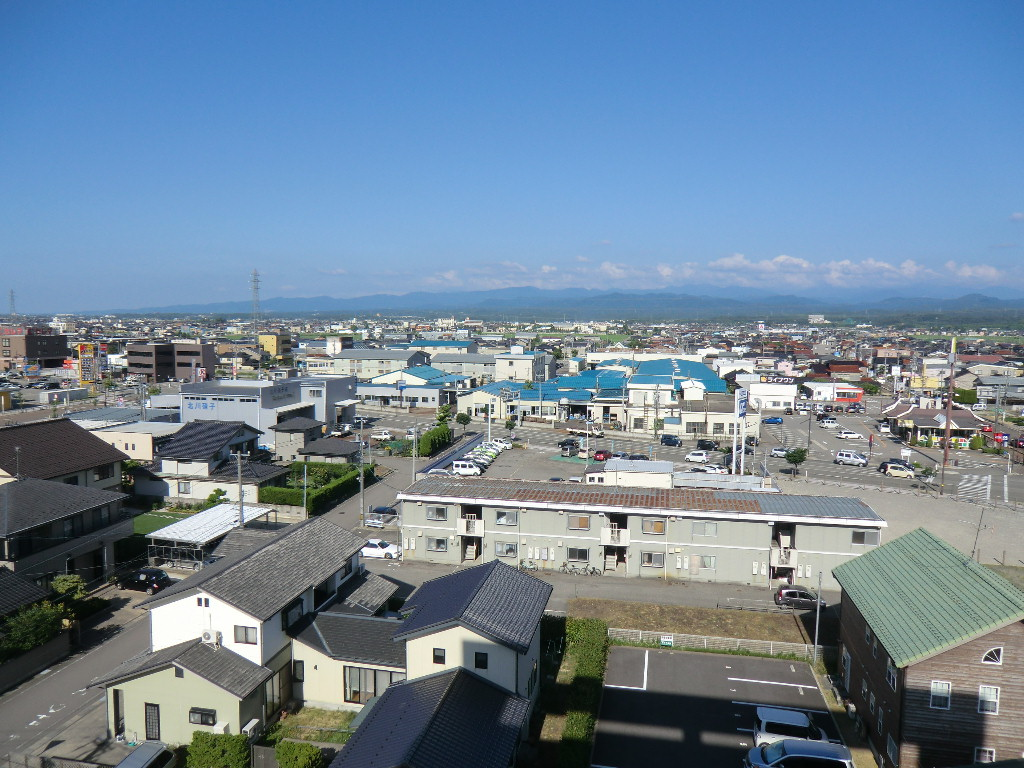
03.Komatsu

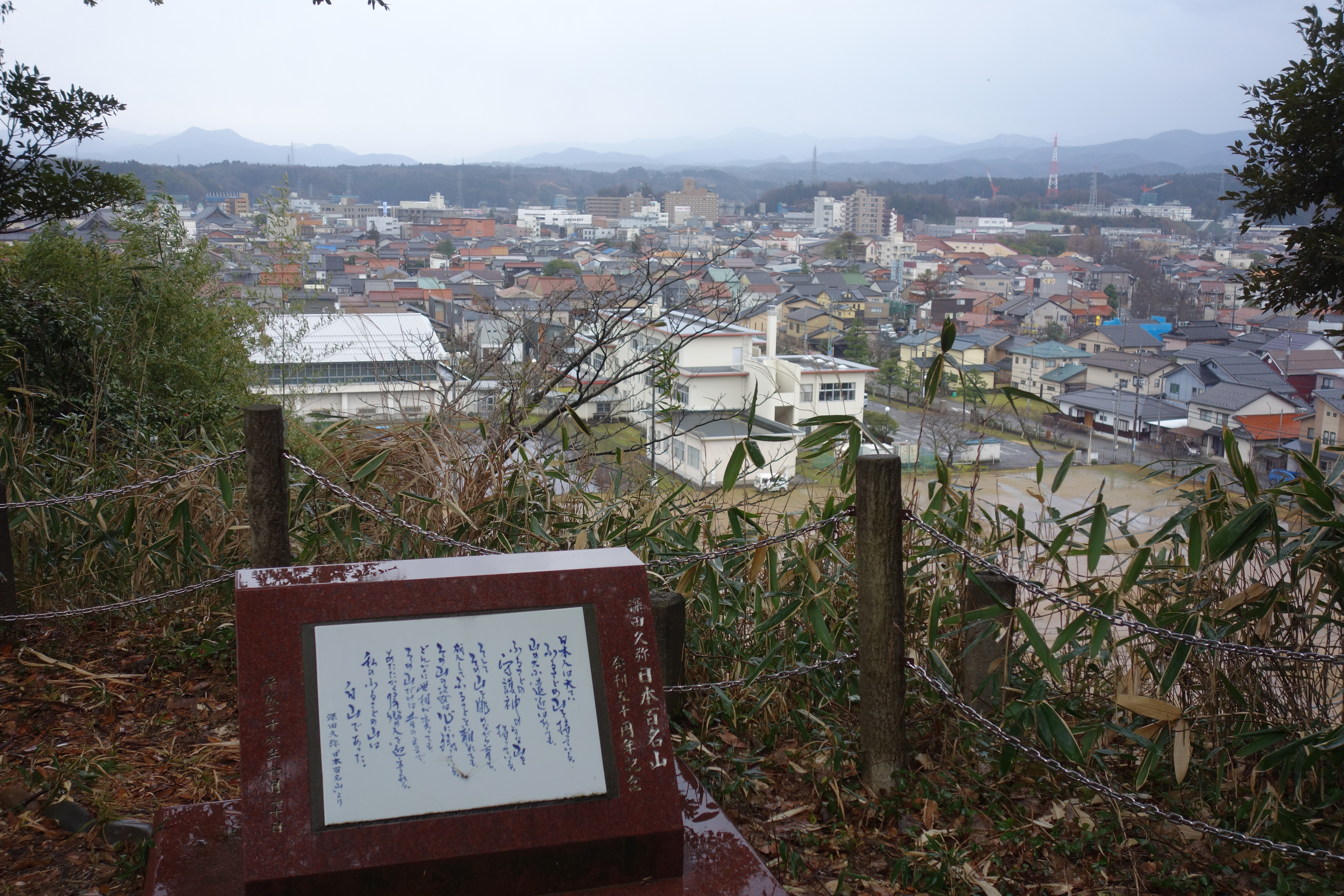
04.Kaga

The following table lists the 19 cities and towns in Ishikawa with a population of at least 5,000 on October 1, 2020, according to the 2020 Census. The table also gives an overview of the evolution of the population since the 1995 census.

Rank (2020)	Name	Status	2020	2015	2010	2005	2000	1995
1	Kanazawa	City	463,583	465,699	462,361	454,607	456,438	453,975
2	Hakusan	City	110,497	109,287	110,459	109,450	106,977	103,580
3	Komatsu	City	106,292	106,919	108,433	109,084	108,622	107,965
4	Kaga	City	63,263	67,186	71,887	74,982	78,563	80,333
5	Nonoichi	City	57,260	55,099	51,885	47,977	45,581	42,945
6	Nanao	City	50,336	55,325	57,900	61,871	63,963	67,368
7	Nomi	City	48,547	48,881	48,680	47,207	45,077	42,033
8	Tsubata	Town	36,966	36,968	36,940	35,712	34,304	30,318
9	Kahoku	City	34,911	34,219	34,651	34,847	34,670	34,722
10	Uchinada	Town	26,588	26,987	26,927	26,896	26,560	26,367
11	Wajima	City	24,633	27,216	29,858	32,823	34,531	37,133
12	Hakui	City	20,429	21,729	23,032	24,517	25,541	26,502
13	Shika	Town	18,641	20,422	22,216	23,790	25,396	26,965
14	Nakanoto	Town	16,552	17,571	18,535	18,959	19,149	19,716
15	Noto	Town	15,693	17,568	19,565	21,792	23,673	25,590
16	Suzu	City	12,934	14,625	16,300	18,050	19,852	21,580
17	Hōdatsushimizu	Town	12,129	13,174	14,277	15,236	15,891	16,409
18	Anamizu	Town	7,897	8,786	9,735	10,549	11,267	12,053
19	Kawakita	Town	6,143	6,347	6,147	5,677	4,922	4,514
