= 2009 Asian Athletics Championships – Women's 20 kilometres walk =

The women's 20 kilometres walk event at the 2009 Asian Athletics Championships was held on November 13.

== Results ==
| Rank | Name | Nationality | Time | Penalties | Notes |
|---|---|---|---|---|---|
| 1st place, gold medalist(s) | Mayumi Kawasaki | Japan | 1:30:12 | | CR |
| 2nd place, silver medalist(s) | Yang Yawei | China | 1:34:11 | ~ | |
| 3rd place, bronze medalist(s) | Svetlana Tolstaya | Kazakhstan | 1:36:42 | | |
| 4 | Galina Kichigina | Kazakhstan | 1:47:14 | | |
| | Liu Hong | China | DQ | ~~~ | |
