= Major League Baseball Rookie of the Year Award =

American professional sports award

In Major League Baseball, the Rookie of the Year Award is given annually to two outstanding rookie players, one each for the American League (AL) and National League (NL), as voted on by the Baseball Writers' Association of America (BBWAA). The award was established in 1940 by the Chicago chapter of the BBWAA, which selected an annual winner from 1940 through 1946. The award became national in 1947; Jackie Robinson, the Brooklyn Dodgers' second baseman, won the inaugural award. One award was presented for all of MLB in 1947 and 1948; since 1949, the honor has been given to one player each in the NL and AL. Originally, the award was known as the J. Louis Comiskey Memorial Award, named after the Chicago White Sox owner of the 1930s. The award was renamed the Jackie Robinson Award in July 1987, 40 years after Robinson broke the baseball color line.

Twenty-one players have been elected to the National Baseball Hall of Fame—Robinson, seven AL players, and eleven others from the NL. The award has been shared twice: once by Butch Metzger and Pat Zachry of the NL in 1976; and once by John Castino and Alfredo Griffin of the AL in 1979. Members of the Brooklyn and Los Angeles Dodgers have won the most awards of any franchise (with 18). Fred Lynn and Ichiro Suzuki are the only two players who have been named Rookie of the Year and Most Valuable Player in the same year, and Fernando Valenzuela is the only player to have won Rookie of the Year and the Cy Young Award in the same year. Sam Jethroe is the oldest player to have won the award, at age 32, 33 days older than 2000 winner Kazuhiro Sasaki (also 32). Kevin McGonigle of the Detroit Tigers and Sal Stewart of the Cincinnati Reds are the most recent winners.

== Qualifications and voting ==
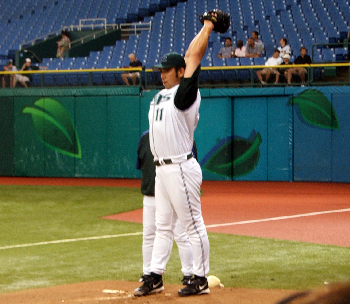
Hideo Nomo won in 1995, the first of several players to win with past professional baseball experience in Nippon Professional Baseball.

From 1947 through 1956, each BBWAA voter used discretion as to who qualified as a rookie. In 1957, the term was first defined as someone with fewer than 75 at-bats or 45 innings pitched in any previous Major League season. This guideline was later amended to 90 at-bats, 45 innings pitched, or 45 days on a Major League roster before September 1 of the previous year. The current standard of 130 at-bats, 50 innings pitched, or 45 days on the active roster of a Major League club (excluding time in military service or on the injury list) before September 1 was adopted in 1971.

Since 1980, each voter names three rookies: a first-place choice is given five points, a second-place choice three points, and a third-place choice one point. The award goes to the player who receives the most overall points. Edinson Vólquez received three second-place votes in 2008 balloting despite no longer being a rookie under the award's definition.

The award has drawn criticism in recent years because several players with experience in Nippon Professional Baseball (NPB) have won the award, such as Hideo Nomo in 1995, Kazuhiro Sasaki in 2000, Ichiro Suzuki in 2001, and Shohei Ohtani in 2018. The current definition of rookie status for the award is based only on Major League experience, but some feel that past NPB players are not true rookies because of their past professional experience. Others, however, believe it should make no difference since the first recipient and the award's namesake played for the Negro leagues before his MLB career and thus could also not be considered a "true rookie". This issue arose in 2003 when Hideki Matsui narrowly lost the AL award to Ángel Berroa. Jim Souhan of the Minneapolis Star Tribune said he did not see Matsui as a rookie in 2003 because "it would be an insult to the Japanese league to pretend that experience didn't count." The Japan Times ran a story in 2007 on the labeling of Daisuke Matsuzaka, Kei Igawa, and Hideki Okajima as rookies, saying "[t]hese guys aren't rookies." Past winners such as Jackie Robinson, Don Newcombe, and Sam Jethroe had professional experience in the Negro leagues.

== Winners ==
=== Key ===
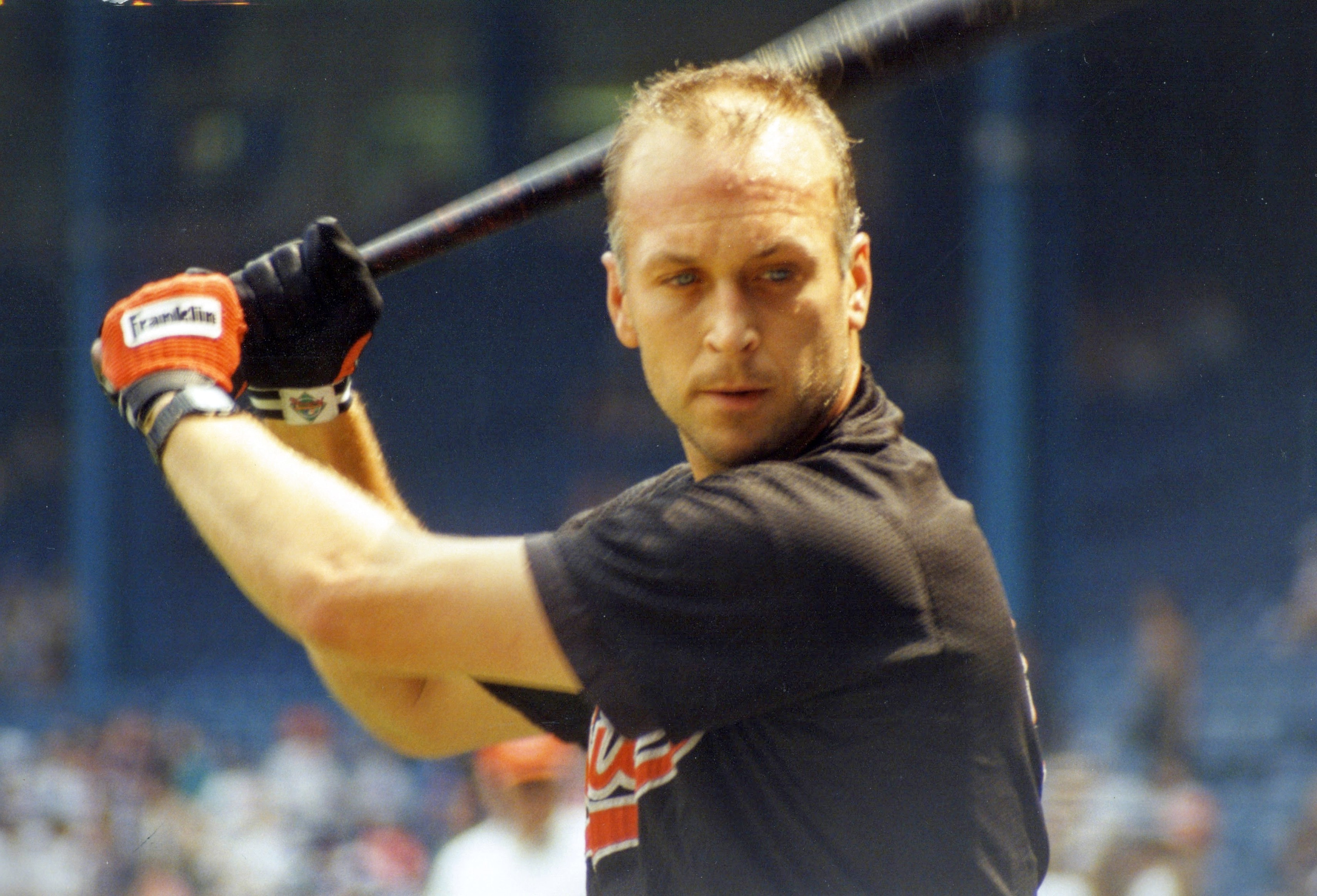
Cal Ripken Jr. won in 1982, and is one of 21 Hall of Famers to win Rookie of the Year honors.

Year	Links to the article about the corresponding Major League Baseball season
†	Member of the National Baseball Hall of Fame and Museum
^	Denotes player who is still active
*	Denotes year in which the award was shared
§	Unanimous selection
+	Denotes lead Major Leagues in that category

=== Major Leagues combined (1947–48) ===
Year	Player	Team	Position	Selected statistics	Ref
1947	Jackie Robinson^{†}	Brooklyn Dodgers	1B	.297 batting average; 125 runs scored; 29 stolen bases	
1948	Alvin Dark	Boston Braves	SS	.322 batting average; 3 home runs; 48 runs batted in	

=== American League winners (1949–present) ===
Year	Player	Team	Position	Selected statistics	Ref
1949	Roy Sievers	St. Louis Browns	OF	.306 batting average; 16 home runs; 91 runs batted in	
1950	Walt Dropo	Boston Red Sox	1B	.322 batting average; 34 home runs; 144 runs batted in	
1951	Gil McDougald	New York Yankees	3B	.306 batting average; 14 home runs; 63 runs batted in	
1952	Harry Byrd	Philadelphia Athletics	P	3.31 earned run average; 15 complete games; 15–15 record in 37 appearances (28 games started)	
1953	Harvey Kuenn	Detroit Tigers	SS	.308 batting average; 94 runs scored; 209 hits	
1954	Bob Grim	New York Yankees	P	3.26 earned run average; 199 innings pitched; 20–6 record in 37 appearances (20 games started)	
1955	Herb Score	Cleveland Indians	P	2.85 earned run average; 227 1/3 innings pitched; 16–10 record in 32 games started	
1956	Luis Aparicio^{†}	Chicago White Sox	SS	.266 batting average; 21 stolen bases; 69 runs scored	
1957	Tony Kubek	New York Yankees	SS	.297 batting average; 56 runs scored; 39 runs batted in	
1958	Albie Pearson	Washington Senators	OF	.275 batting average; 3 home runs; 63 runs scored	
1959	Bob Allison	Washington Senators	OF	.261 batting average; 30 home runs; 85 runs batted in	
1960	Ron Hansen	Baltimore Orioles	SS	.255 batting average; 22 home runs; 86 runs batted in	
1961	Don Schwall	Boston Red Sox	P	3.22 earned run average; 178 2/3 innings pitched; 15–7 record in 25 games started	
1962	Tom Tresh	New York Yankees	SS	.286 batting average; 20 home runs; 93 runs batted in	
1963	Gary Peters	Chicago White Sox	P	2.33 earned run average; 243 innings pitched; 19–8 record in 41 appearances (30 games started)	
1964	Tony Oliva^{†}	Minnesota Twins	OF	.323 batting average; 32 home runs; 94 runs batted in	
1965	Curt Blefary	Baltimore Orioles	OF	.260 batting average; 22 home runs; 70 runs batted in	
1966	Tommie Agee	Chicago White Sox	OF	.273 batting average; 44 stolen bases; 98 runs scored; 29.3 Power-Speed #^{+}	
1967	Rod Carew^{†}	Minnesota Twins	2B	.292 batting average; 8 home runs; 66 runs scored	
1968	Stan Bahnsen	New York Yankees	P	2.05 earned run average; 267 1/3 innings pitched; 17–12 record in 34 games started	
1969	Lou Piniella	Kansas City Royals	OF	.282 batting average; 11 home runs; 68 runs batted in	
1970	Thurman Munson	New York Yankees	C	.302 batting average; 53 runs batted in; 52% caught stealing percentage in the field	
1971	Chris Chambliss	Cleveland Indians	1B	.275 batting average; 9 home runs; 48 runs batted in	
1972	Carlton Fisk^{†§}	Boston Red Sox	C	.293 batting average; 22 home runs; 61 runs batted in	
1973	Al Bumbry	Baltimore Orioles	OF	.337 batting average; 11 triples; 73 runs scored	
1974	Mike Hargrove	Texas Rangers	1B	.323 batting average; .395 on-base percentage; 66 runs batted in	
1975	Fred Lynn	Boston Red Sox	OF	.331 batting average; 47 doubles; 105 runs batted in	
1976	Mark Fidrych	Detroit Tigers	P	2.34 earned run average; 24 complete games; 19–9 record in 29 games started	
1977	Eddie Murray^{†}	Baltimore Orioles	DH	.283 batting average; 27 home runs; 88 runs batted in	
1978	Lou Whitaker	Detroit Tigers	2B	.285 batting average; 3 home runs; 58 runs batted in	
1979*	John Castino	Minnesota Twins	3B	.285 batting average; 8 triples; 52 runs batted in	
1979*	Alfredo Griffin	Toronto Blue Jays	SS	.287 batting average; 10 triples; 81 runs scored	
1980	Joe Charboneau	Cleveland Indians	OF	.289 batting average; 23 home runs; 87 runs batted in	
1981	Dave Righetti	New York Yankees	P	2.05 earned run average; 105 1/3 innings pitched; 8–4 record in 15 games started	
1982	Cal Ripken Jr.^{†}	Baltimore Orioles	SS	.264 batting average; 28 home runs; 93 runs batted in	
1983	Ron Kittle	Chicago White Sox	OF	.254 batting average; 35 home runs; 100 runs batted in	
1984	Alvin Davis	Seattle Mariners	1B	.284 batting average; 27 home runs; 116 runs batted in	
1985	Ozzie Guillén	Chicago White Sox	SS	.273 batting average; 9 triples; 71 runs scored	
1986	Jose Canseco	Oakland Athletics	OF	.240 batting average; 33 home runs; 117 runs batted in	
1987	Mark McGwire^{§}	Oakland Athletics	1B	.289 batting average; 49 home runs; 118 runs batted in	
1988	Walt Weiss	Oakland Athletics	SS	.250 batting average; 3 home runs; 39 runs batted in	
1989	Gregg Olson	Baltimore Orioles	P	1.69 earned run average; 85 innings pitched; 27 saves	
1990	Sandy Alomar Jr.^{§}	Cleveland Indians	C	.290 batting average; 9 home runs; 66 runs batted in	
1991	Chuck Knoblauch	Minnesota Twins	2B	.281 batting average; 25 stolen bases; 78 runs scored	
1992	Pat Listach	Milwaukee Brewers	SS	.290 batting average; 54 stolen bases; 93 runs scored	
1993	Tim Salmon^{§}	California Angels	OF	.283 batting average; 31 home runs; 95 runs batted in	
1994	Bob Hamelin	Kansas City Royals	DH	.282 batting average; 24 home runs; 65 runs batted in	
1995	Marty Cordova	Minnesota Twins	OF	.277 batting average; 24 home runs; 84 runs batted in	
1996	Derek Jeter^{†§}	New York Yankees	SS	.314 batting average; 10 home runs; 104 runs scored	
1997	Nomar Garciaparra^{§}	Boston Red Sox	SS	.306 batting average; 30 home runs; 122 runs scored	
1998	Ben Grieve	Oakland Athletics	OF	.288 batting average; 18 home runs; 89 runs batted in	
1999	Carlos Beltrán^{†}	Kansas City Royals	OF	.293 batting average; 22 home runs; 108 runs batted in	
2000	Kazuhiro Sasaki	Seattle Mariners	P	3.16 earned run average; 78 strikeouts; 37 saves	
2001	Ichiro Suzuki^{†}	Seattle Mariners	OF	.350 batting average; 56 stolen bases^{+}; 242 Hits^{+}; 127 runs scored	
2002	Eric Hinske	Toronto Blue Jays	3B	.279 batting average; 24 home runs; 84 runs batted in	
2003	Ángel Berroa	Kansas City Royals	SS	.287 batting average; 21 stolen bases; 92 runs scored	
2004	Bobby Crosby	Oakland Athletics	SS	.239 batting average; 22 home runs; 64 runs batted in	
2005	Huston Street	Oakland Athletics	P	1.72 earned run average; 78 1/3 innings pitched; 23 saves	
2006	Justin Verlander	Detroit Tigers	P	3.63 earned run average; 186 innings pitched; 17–9 record in 30 games started	
2007	Dustin Pedroia	Boston Red Sox	2B	.317 batting average; 39 doubles; 86 runs scored	
2008	Evan Longoria^{§}	Tampa Bay Rays	3B	.272 batting average; 27 home runs; 85 runs batted in	
2009	Andrew Bailey	Oakland Athletics	P	1.84 earned run average; 83 1/3 innings pitched; 26 saves	
2010	Neftalí Feliz	Texas Rangers	P	2.73 earned run average; 69 1/3 innings pitched; 40 saves	
2011	Jeremy Hellickson	Tampa Bay Rays	P	2.95 earned run average; 117 strikeouts; 13–10 record in 29 games started	
2012	Mike Trout^{^§}	Los Angeles Angels of Anaheim	OF	.326 batting average; 30 home runs; 129 runs scored; 49 stolen bases	
2013	Wil Myers^{^}	Tampa Bay Rays	OF	.293 batting average; 13 home runs; 53 runs batted in	
2014	José Abreu^{^§}	Chicago White Sox	1B	.317 batting average; 36 home runs; 107 runs batted in	
2015	Carlos Correa^{^}	Houston Astros	SS	.279 batting average; 22 home runs; 68 runs batted in	
2016	Michael Fulmer^{^}	Detroit Tigers	P	3.06 earned run average; 132 strikeouts; 11–7 record in 26 games started	
2017	Aaron Judge^{^§}	New York Yankees	OF	.284 batting average; 52 home runs; 114 runs batted in; 128 runs scored	
2018	Shohei Ohtani^{^}	Los Angeles Angels	P/DH	.285 batting average; 22 home runs; 4–2 record in 11 games started; 63 strikeouts	
2019	Yordan Alvarez^{^§}	Houston Astros	DH/OF	.313 batting average; 27 home runs; 78 runs batted in; 58 runs scored	
2020	Kyle Lewis^{^§}	Seattle Mariners	OF	.267 batting average; 11 home runs; 28 runs batted in; 37 runs scored	
2021	Randy Arozarena^{^}	Tampa Bay Rays	OF	.274 batting average; 20 home runs; 69 runs batted in; 94 runs scored	
2022	Julio Rodríguez^{^}	Seattle Mariners	OF	.284 batting average; 28 home runs; 25 stolen bases; 75 runs batted in; 84 runs scored	
2023	Gunnar Henderson^{^}§	Baltimore Orioles	SS/3B	.255 batting average; 28 home runs; 82 runs batted in; 100 runs scored	
2024	Luis Gil^{^}	New York Yankees	P	3.50 earned run average; 171 strikeouts; 15–7 record in 29 games started	
2025	Nick Kurtz^{^§}	Athletics	1B	.290 batting average; 36 home runs; 86 runs batted in; 90 runs scored	
2026	Kevin McGonigle^{^}	Detroit Tigers	SS	.278 batting average; 18 home runs; 72 runs batted in; 97 runs scored	

=== National League winners (1949–present) ===
Year	Player	Team	Position	Selected statistics	Ref
1949	Don Newcombe	Brooklyn Dodgers	P	3.17 earned run average; 5 shutouts; 17–8 record in 31 games started	
1950	Sam Jethroe	Boston Braves	OF	.273 batting average; 35 stolen bases; 100 runs scored	
1951	Willie Mays^{†}	New York Giants	OF	.274 batting average; 20 home runs; 68 runs batted in	
1952	Joe Black	Brooklyn Dodgers	P	2.15 earned run average; 15 saves; 15–4 record in 56 appearances	
1953	Jim Gilliam	Brooklyn Dodgers	2B	.278 batting average; 17 triples; 125 runs scored	
1954	Wally Moon	St. Louis Cardinals	OF	.304 batting average; 12 home runs; 106 runs scored	
1955	Bill Virdon	St. Louis Cardinals	OF	.281 batting average; 17 home runs; 68 runs batted in	
1956	Frank Robinson^{†§}	Cincinnati Reds	OF	.290 batting average; 38 home runs; 122 runs scored	
1957	Jack Sanford	Philadelphia Phillies	P	3.08 earned run average; 188 strikeouts; 19–8 record in 33 games started	
1958	Orlando Cepeda^{†§}	San Francisco Giants	1B	.312 batting average; 25 home runs; 96 runs batted in	
1959	Willie McCovey^{†§}	San Francisco Giants	1B	.354 batting average; 13 home runs; 38 runs batted in	
1960	Frank Howard	Los Angeles Dodgers	OF	.268 batting average; 23 home runs; 77 runs batted in	
1961	Billy Williams^{†}	Chicago Cubs	OF	.278 batting average; 25 home runs; 86 runs batted in	
1962	Ken Hubbs	Chicago Cubs	2B	.260 batting average; 90 runs scored; Gold Glove Award	
1963	Pete Rose	Cincinnati Reds	2B	.273 batting average; 9 triples; 101 runs scored	
1964	Dick Allen^{†}	Philadelphia Phillies	3B	.318 batting average; 13 triples; 125 runs scored	
1965	Jim Lefebvre	Los Angeles Dodgers	2B	.250 batting average; 12 home runs; 69 runs batted in	
1966	Tommy Helms	Cincinnati Reds	2B	.284 batting average; 9 home runs; 72 runs scored	
1967	Tom Seaver^{†}	New York Mets	P	2.76 earned run average; 251 innings pitched; 16–13 record in 34 games started	
1968	Johnny Bench^{†}	Cincinnati Reds	C	.275 batting average; 15 home runs; 82 runs batted in	
1969	Ted Sizemore	Los Angeles Dodgers	2B	.271 batting average; 4 home runs; 69 runs scored	
1970	Carl Morton	Montreal Expos	P	3.60 earned run average; 284 2/3 innings pitched; 18–11 record in 43 appearances (37 games started)	
1971	Earl Williams	Atlanta Braves	C	.260 batting average; 33 home runs; 87 runs batted in	
1972	Jon Matlack	New York Mets	P	2.32 earned run average; 244 innings pitched; 15–10 record in 32 games started	
1973	Gary Matthews	San Francisco Giants	OF	.300 batting average; 12 home runs; 74 runs scored	
1974	Bake McBride	St. Louis Cardinals	OF	.309 batting average; 30 stolen bases; 81 runs scored	
1975	John Montefusco	San Francisco Giants	P	2.88 earned run average; 215 strikeouts; 15–9 record on 34 games started	
1976*	Butch Metzger	San Diego Padres	P	2.92 earned run average; 16 saves; 11–4 record in 77 appearances	
1976*	Pat Zachry	Cincinnati Reds	P	2.74 earned run average; 204 innings pitched; 14–7 record in 38 appearances (28 games started)	
1977	Andre Dawson^{†}	Montreal Expos	OF	.282 batting average; 19 home runs; 65 runs batted in	
1978	Bob Horner	Atlanta Braves	3B	.266 batting average; 23 home runs; 63 runs batted in	
1979	Rick Sutcliffe	Los Angeles Dodgers	P	3.46 earned run average; 242 innings pitched; 17–10 record in 39 appearances (30 games started)	
1980	Steve Howe	Los Angeles Dodgers	P	2.66 earned run average; 84 2/3 innings pitched; 17 saves	
1981	Fernando Valenzuela	Los Angeles Dodgers	P	2.48 earned run average; 8 shutouts; 13–7 record in 25 games started	
1982	Steve Sax	Los Angeles Dodgers	2B	.282 batting average; 49 stolen bases; 88 runs scored	
1983	Darryl Strawberry	New York Mets	OF	.257 batting average; 26 home runs; 74 runs batted in	
1984	Dwight Gooden	New York Mets	P	2.60 earned run average; 276 strikeouts^{+}; 17–9 record in 31 games started; 218 innings pitched; 7 Complete Games/3 Shutouts; 1.073 WHIP^{+}; 1.69 FIP^{+}	
1985	Vince Coleman^{§}	St. Louis Cardinals	OF	.267 batting average; 110 stolen bases^{+}; 107 runs scored	
1986	Todd Worrell	St. Louis Cardinals	P	2.08 earned run average; 103 2/3 innings pitched; 36 saves	
1987	Benito Santiago^{§}	San Diego Padres	C	.300 batting average; 18 home runs; 79 runs batted in	
1988	Chris Sabo	Cincinnati Reds	3B	.271 batting average; 46 stolen bases; 74 runs scored	
1989	Jerome Walton	Chicago Cubs	OF	.293 batting average; 24 stolen bases; 64 runs scored	
1990	David Justice	Atlanta Braves	OF	.282 batting average; 28 home runs; 78 runs batted in	
1991	Jeff Bagwell^{†}	Houston Astros	1B	.294 batting average; 15 home runs; 82 runs batted in	
1992	Eric Karros	Los Angeles Dodgers	1B	.257 batting average; 20 home runs; 88 runs batted in	
1993	Mike Piazza^{†§}	Los Angeles Dodgers	C	.318 batting average; 35 home runs; 112 runs batted in	
1994	Raúl Mondesí^{§}	Los Angeles Dodgers	OF	.306 batting average; 16 home runs; 56 runs batted in	
1995	Hideo Nomo	Los Angeles Dodgers	P	2.54 earned run average; 236 strikeouts; 13–6 record in 28 games started	
1996	Todd Hollandsworth	Los Angeles Dodgers	OF	.291 batting average; 12 home runs; 59 runs batted in	
1997	Scott Rolen^{†§}	Philadelphia Phillies	3B	.283 batting average; 21 home runs; 92 runs batted in	
1998	Kerry Wood	Chicago Cubs	P	3.40 earned run average; 233 strikeouts; 13–6 record in 26 games started	
1999	Scott Williamson	Cincinnati Reds	P	2.41 earned run average; 19 saves; 12–7 record in 62 appearances	
2000	Rafael Furcal	Atlanta Braves	SS	.295 batting average; 40 stolen bases; 87 runs scored	
2001	Albert Pujols^{§}	St. Louis Cardinals	3B	.329 batting average; 37 home runs; 130 runs batted in	
2002	Jason Jennings	Colorado Rockies	P	4.52 earned run average; 185 1/3 innings pitched; 16–8 record in 32 games started	
2003	Dontrelle Willis	Florida Marlins	P	3.30 earned run average; 160 2/3 innings pitched; 14–6 record in 27 games started	
2004	Jason Bay	Pittsburgh Pirates	OF	.282 batting average; 26 home runs; 82 runs batted in	
2005	Ryan Howard	Philadelphia Phillies	1B	.288 batting average; 22 home runs; 63 runs batted in	
2006	Hanley Ramírez	Florida Marlins	SS	.292 batting average; 51 stolen bases; 119 runs scored	
2007	Ryan Braun	Milwaukee Brewers	3B	.324 batting average; 34 home runs; 97 runs batted in	
2008	Geovany Soto	Chicago Cubs	C	.285 batting average; 23 home runs; 86 runs batted in	
2009	Chris Coghlan	Florida Marlins	OF	.321 batting average; 162 base hits; 84 runs scored	
2010	Buster Posey	San Francisco Giants	C	.305 batting average; 18 home runs; 67 runs batted in	
2011	Craig Kimbrel^{^§}	Atlanta Braves	P	2.10 earned run average; 127 strikeouts in 77 innings pitched; 46 saves	
2012	Bryce Harper^{^}	Washington Nationals	OF	.270 batting average; 22 home runs; 59 runs batted in	
2013	José Fernández	Miami Marlins	P	2.19 earned run average; 0.98 WHIP; 12 wins	
2014	Jacob deGrom^{^}	New York Mets	P	2.69 earned run average; 1.14 WHIP; 9 wins	
2015	Kris Bryant^{^§}	Chicago Cubs	3B	.275 batting average; 26 home runs; 99 runs batted in	
2016	Corey Seager^{^§}	Los Angeles Dodgers	SS	.308 batting average; 26 home runs; 72 runs batted in	
2017	Cody Bellinger^{^§}	Los Angeles Dodgers	1B	.267 batting average; 39 home runs; 97 runs batted in	
2018	Ronald Acuña Jr.^{^}	Atlanta Braves	OF	.293 batting average; 26 home runs; 64 runs batted in	
2019	Pete Alonso^{^}	New York Mets	1B	.260 batting average; 53 home runs^{+}; 120 runs batted in; 103 runs scored	
2020	Devin Williams^{^}	Milwaukee Brewers	P	0.33 earned run average; 0.63 WHIP; 53 strikeouts in 27 innings pitched	
2021	Jonathan India^{^}	Cincinnati Reds	2B	.269 batting average; 21 home runs; 69 runs batted in; 98 runs scored	
2022	Michael Harris II^{^}	Atlanta Braves	OF	.297 batting average; 19 home runs; 64 runs batted in; 75 runs scored	
2023	Corbin Carroll^{^} §	Arizona Diamondbacks	OF	.285 batting average; 25 home runs; 76 runs batted in; 116 runs scored; 54 stolen bases	
2024	Paul Skenes^{^}	Pittsburgh Pirates	P	1.96 earned run average; 0.95 WHIP; 170 strikeouts in 133 innings pitched; 11–3 record in 23 games started	
2025	Drake Baldwin^{^}	Atlanta Braves	C	.274 batting average; 80 runs batted in; 19 home runs	
2026	Sal Stewart^{^}	Cincinnati Reds	OF	.263 batting average; 111 runs batted in; 32 home runs	

=== Wins by team ===
Following Corbin Carroll winning the award as a member of the Arizona Diamondbacks, every MLB franchise has had at least one Rookie of the Year winner. The Brooklyn/Los Angeles Dodgers have won more than any other team with 18.

Teams	Awards	Years
Brooklyn/Los Angeles Dodgers	18	1947, 1949, 1952, 1953, 1960, 1965, 1969, 1979–1982, 1992–1996, 2016, 2017
New York Yankees	10	1951, 1954, 1957, 1962, 1968, 1970, 1981, 1996, 2017, 2024
Boston/Atlanta Braves	10	1948, 1950, 1971, 1978, 1990, 2000, 2011, 2018, 2022, 2025
Philadelphia/Oakland/Athletics	9	1952, 1986–1988, 1998, 2004, 2005, 2009, 2025
Cincinnati Reds	9	1956, 1963, 1966, 1968, 1976, 1988, 1999, 2021, 2026
St. Louis Browns/Baltimore Orioles	8	1949, 1960, 1965, 1973, 1977, 1982, 1989, 2023
Washington Senators/Minnesota Twins	7	1958, 1959, 1964, 1967, 1979, 1991, 1995
St. Louis Cardinals	6	1954, 1955, 1974, 1985, 1986, 2001
Boston Red Sox	6	1950, 1961, 1972, 1975, 1997, 2007
New York/San Francisco Giants	6	1951, 1958, 1959, 1973, 1975, 2010
Chicago White Sox	6	1956, 1963, 1966, 1983, 1985, 2014
Chicago Cubs	6	1961, 1962, 1989, 1998, 2008, 2015
New York Mets	6	1967, 1972, 1983, 1984, 2014, 2019
Detroit Tigers	6	1953, 1976, 1978, 2006, 2016, 2026
Seattle Mariners	5	1984, 2000, 2001, 2020, 2022
Cleveland Indians/Guardians	4	1955, 1971, 1980, 1990
Kansas City Royals	4	1969, 1994, 1999, 2003
Philadelphia Phillies	4	1957, 1964, 1997, 2005
Florida/Miami Marlins	4	2003, 2006, 2009, 2013
Tampa Bay Rays	4	2008, 2011, 2013, 2021
Montreal Expos/Washington Nationals	3	1970, 1977, 2012
California/Los Angeles Angels of Anaheim/Los Angeles Angels	3	1993, 2012, 2018
Houston Astros	3	1991, 2015, 2019
Milwaukee Brewers	3	1992, 2007, 2020
Pittsburgh Pirates	2	2004, 2024
San Diego Padres	2	1976, 1987
Toronto Blue Jays	2	1979, 2002
Texas Rangers	2	1974, 2010
Arizona Diamondbacks	1	2023
Colorado Rockies	1	2002

== See also ==
- Esurance MLB Awards Best Rookie (in MLB)
- Players Choice Awards Outstanding Rookie (in each league)
- Baseball America Rookie of the Year (in MLB)
- Sporting News Rookie of the Year Award (in each league)
- Rookie of the Month
- Topps All-Star Rookie Teams
- Baseball awards
- Rookie of the Year (award) (all sports)
