= Mayumi Kawasaki =

Japanese race walker

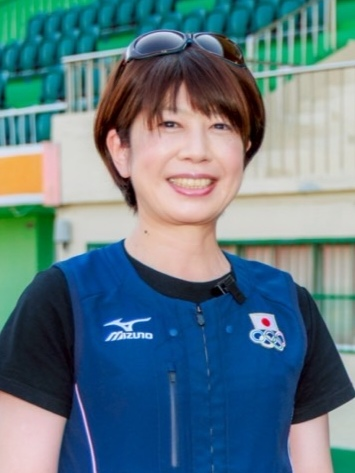
- Kawasaki in 2025

Personal information
- Native name: 喜多 真裕美, Kita Mayumi
- Born: Mayumi Kawasaki (川崎 真裕美, Kawasaki Mayumi); May 10, 1980 (age 46) Ibaraki Prefecture, Japan
- Height: 1.67 m (5 ft 5 1/2 in)
- Weight: 52 kg (115 lb)

Sport
- Country: Japan
- Sport: Athletics
- Event: 20km Race Walk
Medal record
Asian Athletics Championships
| Gold medal – first place | 2009 Guangzhou | 20 km race walk |

Mayumi Kita (喜多 真裕美, Kita Mayumi; née Kawasaki (川崎), born 10 May 1980) is a Japanese race walker from Ibaraki Prefecture. She represented her country in the 20 km race walk at the 2004, 2008 and 2012 Summer Olympics. Her personal best time for the 20 km race walk is 1:28:49 hours.

A three-time Asian Race Walk Champion, she is a former national record holder and the second fastest Japanese race walker after Masumi Fuchise. Kawasaki has competed at the World Championships in Athletics on four occasions, with her best finish being tenth in 2007.

== Career ==
Born in Fukushima Prefecture, she grew up in Kasama, Ibaraki and began competing in racewalking as a teenager. Her first international success came at the 1999 Asian Junior Athletics Championships, where she came second behind China's Li Yurui in the 10,000 metres track walk. She made her senior breakthrough in 2003 with wins at the Japanese Corporate event and the Japanese National Games, before going on to set a national record time of 1:32:16 hours. She improved this to 1:31:19 hours at the 2004 Japanese Championships and was selected for the Olympic team, although injuries resulted in a slow finish in 40th place.

Kawasaki defended her national title in 2005 and competed for Japan at the 2005 World Championships in Athletics, improved upon her previous global level performance by ranking 31st overall. She closed the year with an appearance at the 2005 East Asian Games, where she was beaten into fourth place by compatriot Sachiko Konishi. Injuries affected her the following year, forcing a withdrawal from the 2006 Asian Games, although she managed to place sixth at that year's Asian Race Walking Championships and 52nd at the IAAF World Race Walking Cup. In 2007 her national record was beaten by Masumi Fuchise, but Kawasaki rebounded with a personal best and record time of 1:28:56 hours to win the 2007 Asian Race Walking Championships. Later that season she came tenth at the 2007 World Championships in Athletics held in Osaka – this was the best ever finish by a Japanese woman in the event.

She took part in her second race under one and a half hours in Kobe in 2008, winning the national title race in 1:29:28 hours. Kawasaki won the Asian title for a second year running and was selected for the 2008 Beijing Olympics, where she was the third best Asian finisher with her 13th-place finish in 1:29:43 hours. She joined Fujitsu's track and field club in November 2008. The 2009 Japanese Race Walking Championships saw Kawasaki and national rival Fuchise deliver the fastest times for Japanese walkers: Kawasaki improved her best to 1:28:49 hours, but Fuchise won the title 46 seconds ahead of her. Kawasaki adopted an aggressive walking tactic at the 2009 World Championships in Athletics, but the method did not pay off as she was disqualified for lifting – the first such disqualification in her professional career.

She won her third consecutive Asian title at the end of 2009 and went on to post a high finish of seventh place at the 2010 IAAF World Race Walking Cup. She was fourth in the race walk at the 2010 Asian Games and made her fourth straight appearance at the World Championships with her 22nd-place finish at the 2011 World Championships in Athletics in Daegu. At the 2012 Japanese championships in Nomi City she came second behind Masumi Fuchise.

== Retirement ==
Kawasaki retired soon after returning to Japan from the 2012 London Olympics. She left Fujitsu in January 2013. She got married and, with her husband, runs Kitahachi Onsen Inn in Komatsu City, Ishikawa Prefecture.

== Achievements ==
| Year | Competition | Venue | Position | Event | Notes |
Representing Japan
| 1999 | Asian Junior Championships | Singapore | 2nd | 10,000 m | 52:36.98 |
| 2004 | Olympic Games | Athens, Greece | 40th | 20 km | 1:37:56 |
| 2005 | World Championships | Helsinki, Finland | 31st | 20 km | 1:37:30 |
| 2007 | World Championships | Osaka, Japan | 10th | 20 km | 1:33:35 |
| 2008 | Olympic Games | Beijing, China | 13th | 20 km | 1:29:43 |
| 2009 | World Championships | Berlin, Germany | – | 20 km | DQ |
| 2009 | Asian Championships | Guangzhou, China | 1st | 20 km | 1:30:12 |
| 2010 | World Race Walking Cup | Chihuahua, Mexico | 7th | 20 km | 1:34:53 |
| 2010 | Asian Games | Guangzhou, China | 4th | 20 km | 1:35:13 |
| 2011 | World Championships | Daegu, South Korea | 22nd | 20 km | 1:35:03 |
| 2012 | Olympic Games | London, United Kingdom | 18th | 20 km | 1:30:20 |
