= Ángel Berroa =

Dominican baseball player (born 1977)

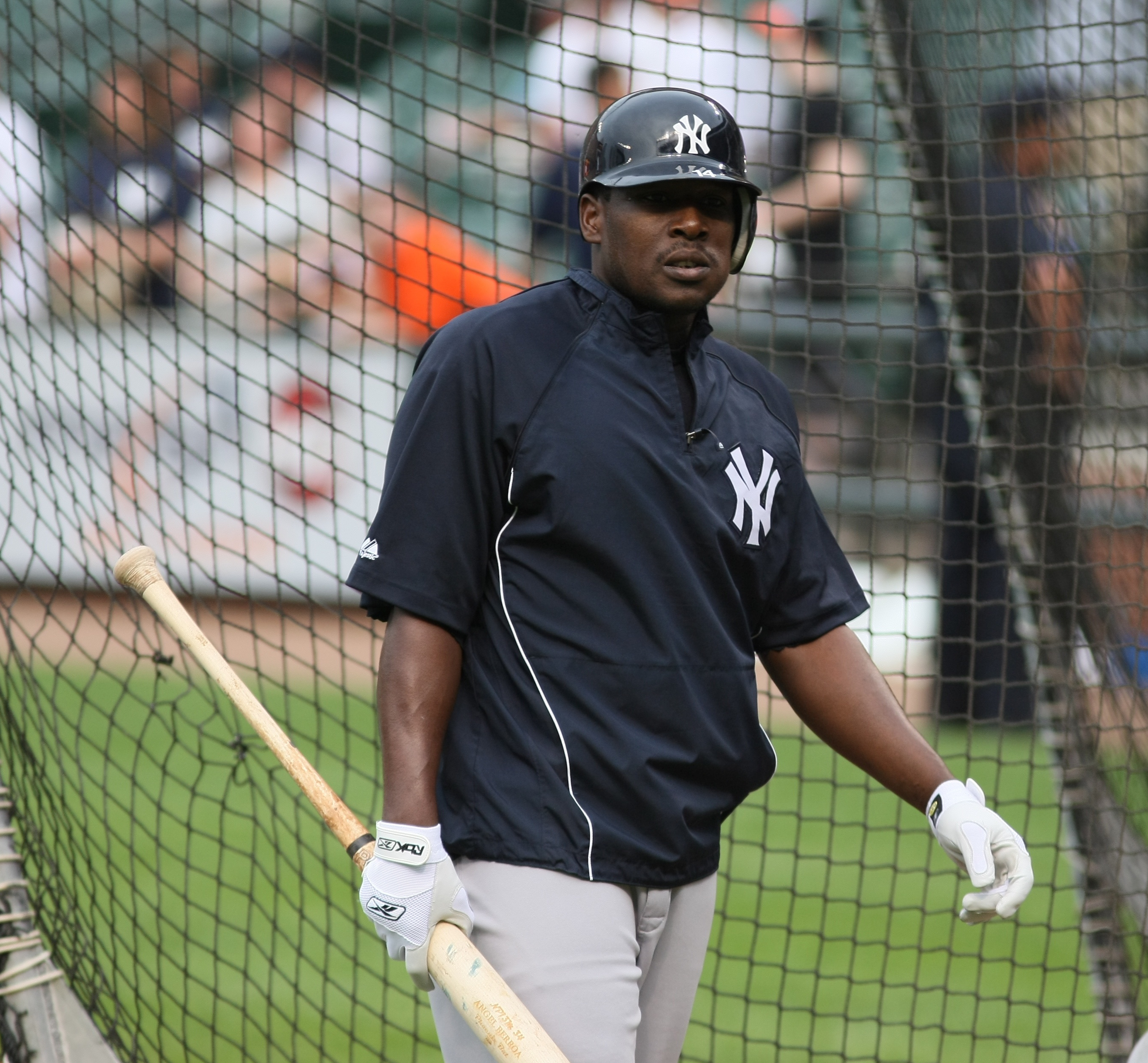
- Berroa with the New York Yankees
- Shortstop
- Born: January 27, 1977 (age 49); Santiago de los Caballeros, Dominican Republic
- Batted: Right Threw: Right

MLB debut
- September 18, 2001, for the Kansas City Royals

Last MLB appearance
- August 6, 2009, for the New York Mets

MLB statistics
- Batting average: .258
- Home run: 46
- Runs batted in: 254
- Stats at Baseball Reference

Teams
- Kansas City Royals (2001–2007); Los Angeles Dodgers (2008); New York Yankees (2009); New York Mets (2009)

Career highlights and awards
- AL Rookie of the Year (2003)

Ángel Maria Berroa Selmo (born January 27, 1977) is a Dominican professional baseball coach and former professional baseball infielder. He played in Major League Baseball (MLB) for the Kansas City Royals, Los Angeles Dodgers, New York Yankees and New York Mets. Berroa was selected as the 2003 American League Rookie of the Year.

== Playing career ==
=== Oakland Athletics ===
Berroa was signed out of the Dominican Republic by the Oakland Athletics on August 14, 1997. After spending the 1998 season with the A's Dominican Summer League affiliate, he debuted stateside in the Arizona League for the 1999 season. There, he hit .290 in 46 games and was named to the league's All-Star team. In 2000, he played for the Visalia Oaks in the California League and received an honorable mention on that year's All-Star team for recording 11 doubles and 11 stolen bases in 129 games. He also committed 54 errors that year, third most in the league.

=== Kansas City Royals ===
On January 8, 2001, Berroa was acquired by the Kansas City Royals in a three-way trade that also included the Tampa Bay Devil Rays. Kansas City acquired Berroa, relief pitcher Roberto Hernández, and backup catcher A. J. Hinch in exchange for Johnny Damon and infielder Mark Ellis. In 2001, he hit a combined .304 with 14 home runs, 67 RBI, and 25 stolen bases between the Wilmington Blue Rocks in High-A and the Wichita Wranglers in Double-A. He played for the World Team in the 2001 All-Star Futures Game. He made his major league debut on September 18 as a defensive replacement against the Cleveland Indians. Berroa made his first start on September 25 and got his first major league hit off Detroit Tigers pitcher José Lima. He hit .302 in 15 games that season.

Berroa's 2002 season was a disaster. It was discovered that he had lied about his age and was actually two years older than he originally claimed to be. Berroa was born in 1978, not 1980, making him 23 during his breakout 2001 season, not 21 like originally believed. He also missed much to a knee injury that required surgery, as well as hamstring and back issues, playing just 77 games for the Omaha Royals in Triple-A and hitting .216 with eight home runs and 35 RBI. Still, he was selected to play for the World Team in the All-Star Futures Game and also played for the Pacific Coast League in the Triple-A All-Star Game. He was called up in September and appeared in twenty games for the Royals.

Following the departure of Neifi Pérez, Berroa was made the team's starting shortstop. He started the season hitting ninth in the batting order but was moved up later in the season. After committing 19 errors in his first 63 games, he had only five errors the rest of the year. Berroa finished the season with a .287 batting average, 17 home runs, 73 RBI, and 21 stolen bases. His performance sparked a media debate over who should be the American League Rookie of the Year: Berroa, Tampa Bay's outfielder Rocco Baldelli, Cleveland's outfielder Jody Gerut, or New York Yankees outfielder Hideki Matsui, a former star in the Central League of Nippon Professional Baseball. In the end, Berroa narrowly beat out Matsui by just four points to become the fourth member of the Royals to win the Rookie of the Year award, following Lou Piniella (1969), Bob Hamelin (1994), and Carlos Beltrán (1999).

Berroa took a step back in 2004. After just 14 games, he hit the disabled list with migraine headaches. In May, the Royals signed him to a four-year, $11 million deal with an option for the 2009 season. He slashed .249/.295/.368 through August 9 and made numerous mental mistakes in the field and on the base paths before he was demoted to Double-A Wichita for two weeks. Following his return, Berroa hit .291 with three home runs and 13 RBI in 38 games to close out the season. His 28 errors in the field led the majors that year.

Berroa's numbers continued to slip in 2005. His quality of play was seen by the media as a cause for manager Tony Pena's resignation on May 10. Berroa was doubled off second base in the ninth inning of a 3–1 game against the Toronto Blue Jays. After losing a franchise-record 104 games in 2004 and getting off to an 8–25 start to the 2005 season, Pena resigned hours after the game ended. He hit .270 with 11 home runs and 55 RBI in a career-high 159 games that year. His 0.17 K/BB rate ranked second worst in the majors.

In 2006, he hit just .234 with nine home runs and 54 RBI in 132 games that year. It was the third year in a row where Berroa's on-base percentage, slugging, and steals declined. His .592 OPS ranked the worst among all qualified hitters, and his average, on-base percentage and slugging were all last among qualified batters in the American League. His 0.16 K/BB was tied for last in the majors that year. Berroa's fielding statistics included 71 errors from 2004 to 2006, which were the most in the majors during that time.

Berroa spent the offseason before the 2007 season in Kansas City to work on his hitting and agility. He went into spring training expected to compete against Alex Gonzalez and Andres Blanco for the shortstop position. He ultimately hit .263 with 14 strikeouts and no walks in 38 at-bats. It was also believed that Berroa's defensive range had deteriorated. On March 23, the Royals acquired shortstop Tony Peña Jr. from the Atlanta Braves. Berroa was optioned to Triple-A Omaha the next day and Peña was named the starting shortstop. He was recalled on May 14, but was 1–11 in nine games with the Royals before being designated for assignment on June 6. Berroa was outrighted to Triple-A and spent the rest of the season in the minors, hitting .300 in 81 games for the Omaha Royals.

He spent spring training in 2008 with the Royals, but was assigned to Triple-A on March 29. He hit .291 in 51 games with Omaha.

=== Los Angeles Dodgers ===
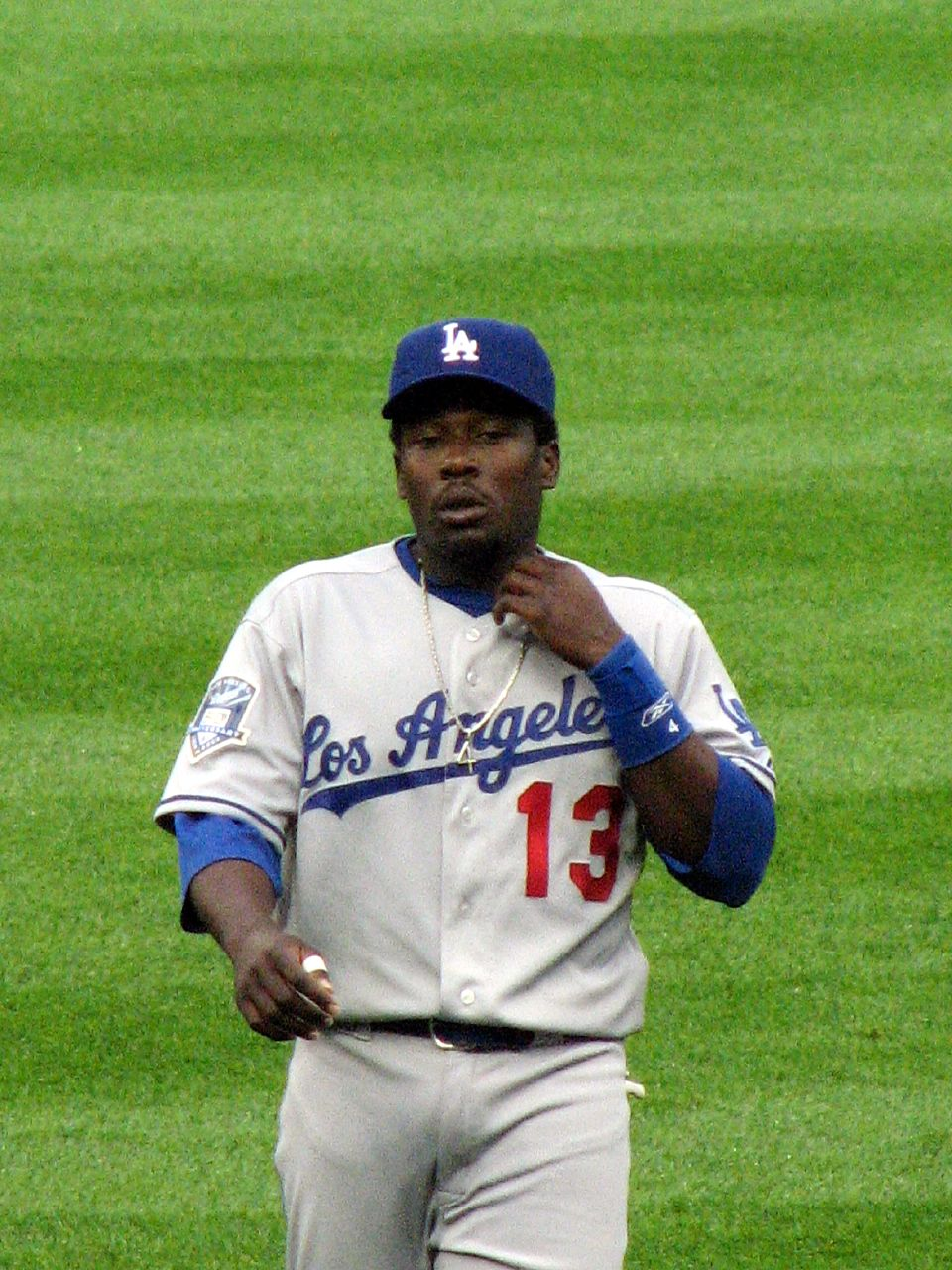
Berroa with the Los Angeles Dodgers on June 13, 2008

On June 6, 2008, Berroa was traded to the Los Angeles Dodgers for minor league infielder Juan Rivera. At the time of the trade, the Dodgers needed a temporary replacement for Rafael Furcal, who was in the disabled list with a back injury. Berroa received a surprisingly large amount of playing time, hitting .230 starting 64 games out of 84 total. Notably, he showed increased patience at the plate, drawing more walks than in any season since 2004 despite not playing a full season.

Berroa was included on the Dodgers' playoff roster as a bench player behind the recently returned Furcal. He was used as a defensive replacement, pinch runner, and pinch hitter in five games during LA's playoff run. He got his first postseason hit in Game 2 of the National League Division Series against the Chicago Cubs. After the end of the season, the Dodgers declined Berroa's $5.5 million option for the 2009 season.

=== New York Yankees ===
On January 6, 2009, Berroa agreed to a minor league deal worth $900,000 with the New York Yankees. He was brought in to compete for a utility infielder role with Cody Ransom expected to played third base in place of the injured Alex Rodriguez. Despite hitting .371 in 29 games, Berroa did not make the opening day roster and was assigned to minor league camp on the last day of spring training. He was added to the major league roster on April 25 following an injury to Ransom, leaving Berroa and Ramiro Pena to fill in at third base. Berroa got his first hit with the Yankees that day. After hitting .136 in 21 games, he was designated for assignment on June 24 once Ransom returned from the 60-day disabled list. He was granted his release on July 7.

=== New York Mets ===
On July 11, 2009, the New York Mets signed Berroa to a minor league contract assigned him to Triple-A Buffalo. On July 16, his contract was purchased by the major league club in order to help fill in for the injured Jose Reyes. He was designated for assignment on August 7. He finished the season having played a combined 35 games with 49 at-bats and a .391 OPS for the Yankees and the Mets.

=== Los Angeles Dodgers (second stint) ===
On December 17, 2009, Berroa was signed to a minor league contract with an invitation to spring training by the Dodgers. However, he failed to make the team and was released by the Dodgers on March 22, 2010.

=== San Francisco Giants ===
On April 28, 2010, Berroa signed a minor league contract with the San Francisco Giants. He hit .206 with four walks and 12 strikeouts in 26 games for the Fresno Grizzlies before he was placed on the disabled list on June 13. Berroa was released on June 26.

=== Bridgeport Bluefish ===
In April 2011, he signed with the Bridgeport Bluefish of the independent Atlantic League. He hit .263 with six home runs and 33 RBI in 64 games with the Bluefish.

=== Arizona Diamondbacks ===
Berroa signed a minor league contract with the Arizona Diamondbacks on July 24, 2011. He was assigned to the Triple-A Reno Aces to replace Cody Ransom, who had been called up to the majors in order to replace the injured Stephen Drew.

=== New Jersey Jackals ===
Berroa spent the 2012 season with the New Jersey Jackals of the Can-Am League, hitting .310 with a team-leading .398 OBP. On July 26, 2012, it was announced Berroa had formally retired from baseball and was seeking a job in professional soccer.

=== Leones de Yucatan ===
Berroa played for Leones de Yucatan in the Mexican League for the 2013 season. He hit .293 with 12 home runs and 62 RBI.

=== Pericos de Pueblo ===
He joined Pericos de Pueblo for the 2014 season and hit .334 with 23 home runs and 98 RBI. That year, he was an LMB All-Star.

=== Vaqueros Laguna ===
On February 6, 2015, Berroa signed with the Vaqueros Laguna in the Mexican League. He was released on June 12. In 44 games he hit .281/.337/.431 with 5 home runs, 28 RBIs and 1 stolen base.

== Post-playing career ==
Berroa has been a coach with the GCL Red Sox since the 2017 season. After four years in the Red Sox organization, he joined the Danville Otterbots of the Appalachian League as hitting coach. In 2022, he was hired as the Latin America infield coordinator for the Detroit Tigers.

== Personal ==
Berroa is the son-in-law of former major league player and coach Luis Silverio.

Awards and achievements
Preceded by Eric Hinske	Players Choice AL Most Outstanding Rookie; 2003	Succeeded by Bobby Crosby
