= Hideki Matsui =

Japanese baseball player (born 1974)

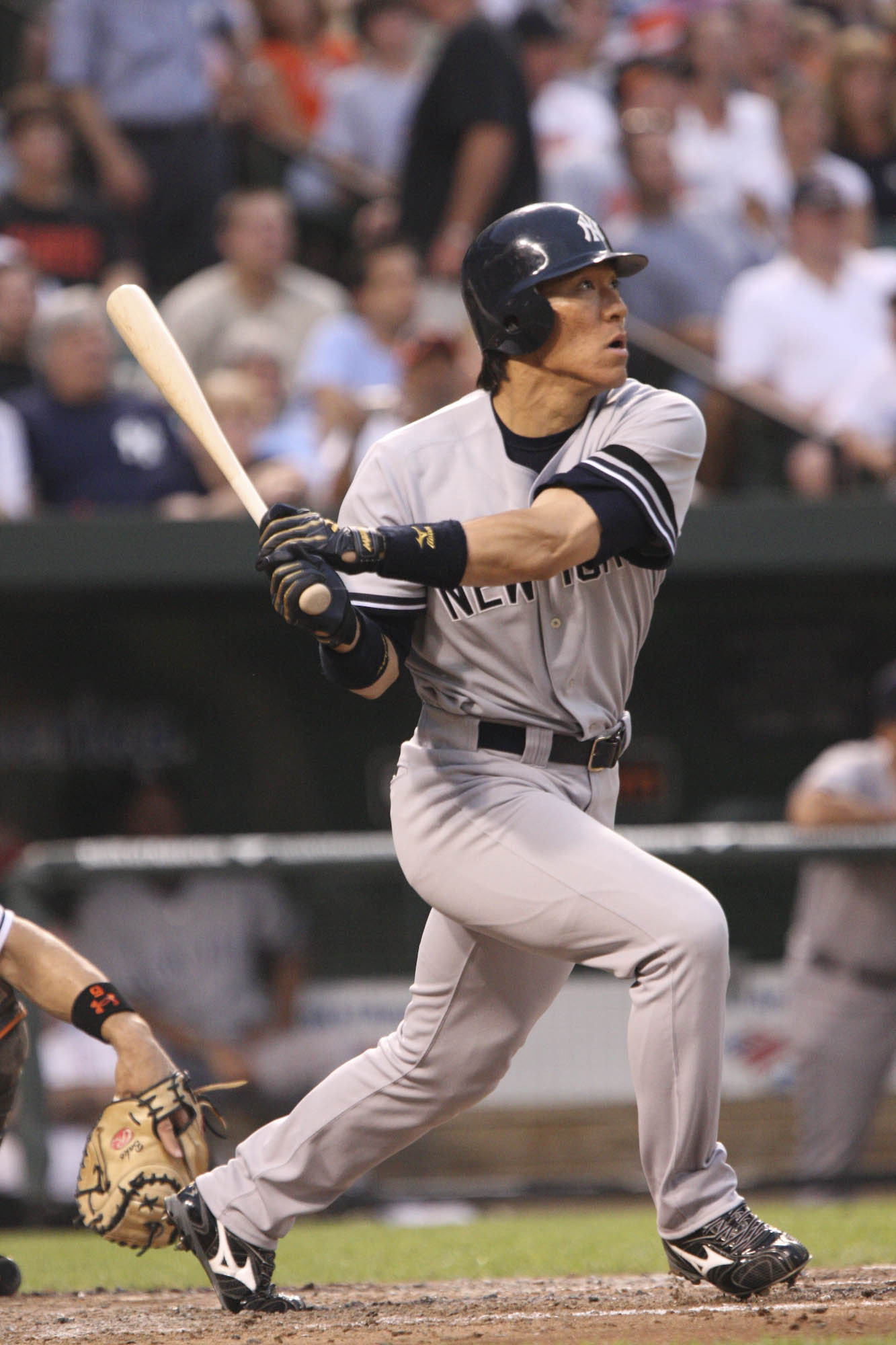
- Matsui with the New York Yankees in 2007

Yomiuri Giants – No. 90
- Outfielder / Designated hitter / Manager
- Born: June 12, 1974 (age 52); Neagari, Ishikawa, Japan
- Batted: Left Threw: Right

Professional debut
- NPB: May 1, 1993, for the Yomiuri Giants
- MLB: March 31, 2003, for the New York Yankees

Last appearance
- NPB: October 30, 2002, for the Yomiuri Giants
- MLB: July 22, 2012, for the Tampa Bay Rays

NPB statistics
- Batting average: .304
- Home runs: 332
- Runs batted in: 889

MLB statistics
- Batting average: .282
- Home runs: 175
- Runs batted in: 760
- Stats at Baseball Reference

Teams
- As player: Yomiuri Giants (1993–2002); New York Yankees (2003–2009); Los Angeles Angels of Anaheim (2010); Oakland Athletics (2011); Tampa Bay Rays (2012); As manager: Yomiuri Giants (2027–)

Career highlights and awards
- NPB: 9× All-Star (1994–2002); 3× Japan Series champion (1994, 2000, 2002); 3× Central League MVP (1996, 2000, 2002); Japan Series MVP (2000); 8× Best Nine Award (1995–2002); Matsutaro Shoriki Award (2000); MLB: 2× All-Star (2003, 2004); World Series champion (2009); World Series MVP (2009)

Member of the Japanese

Baseball Hall of Fame
- Induction: 2018
- Vote: 91.3%

Hideki Matsui

Japanese name
- Kanji: 松井 秀喜
Transcriptions
- Romanization: Matsui Hideki

Hideki Matsui (松井 秀喜, Matsui Hideki; born June 12, 1974), nicknamed "Godzilla", is a Japanese former professional baseball outfielder and designated hitter who is the manager of the Yomiuri Giants of Nippon Professional Baseball's Central League. He played in Major League Baseball (MLB) for the New York Yankees, Los Angeles Angels of Anaheim, Oakland Athletics, Tampa Bay Rays, and in Nippon Professional Baseball (NPB) for the Yomiuri Giants. He batted left-handed and threw right-handed.

Matsui played the first 10 seasons of his career in Japan for NPB's Yomiuri Giants. During that span, he was a nine-time All-Star, three-time Japan Series champion, and three-time Central League Most Valuable Player (MVP). In 2003, Matsui transitioned to playing in MLB in North America, and spent his first seven seasons there with the New York Yankees. As a Yankee, he was a two-time All-Star and 2009 World Series champion, for which he was named the World Series MVP. He is the first Asian player to win the award in league history. After becoming a free agent, Matsui had one-year stints with three other MLB teams: the Los Angeles Angels of Anaheim, Oakland Athletics, and Tampa Bay Rays. On July 28, 2013, Matsui signed a one-day minor league contract with the Yankees in order to officially retire with the team.

During his 20-year playing career, Matsui hit 507 home runs, 332 in NPB and 175 in MLB. In 2018, Matsui was inducted into the Japanese Baseball Hall of Fame.

He was appointed manager of the Yomiuri Giants during the 2026 offseason.

== Early life ==
Hideki Matsui was born in Neagari, Ishikawa, Japan (later merged into Nomi, Ishikawa). According to an interview on YES Network's CenterStage, Matsui originally batted right-handed as a child. However, when he started playing with his older brother and his friends, Matsui was such a good hitter that his embarrassed brother insisted that he bat left-handed or stop playing with them. Matsui soon became an overpowering left-handed batter, thereafter batting left-handed.

Matsui was recruited by Seiryo High School in Kanazawa, Ishikawa, a Western Honshu baseball powerhouse. During his high school years, Matsui participated in four National High School Baseball Tournaments at Koshien Stadium (once in the spring and three times in the summer). In 1992, he drew five consecutive intentional walks in a game at Koshien and became a nationwide topic of conversation. The intentional walks were considered excessive and unsportsmanlike but the strategy worked, as Matsui's team lost. Matsui's reaction to the intentional walks was widely commented upon by the media. "Matsui's stoic, emotionless conduct during those at-bats drew great praise from tournament officials and reporters alike", author Robert Whiting wrote. At the end of the tournament, a representative of the High School Federation declared that "All students should learn from Matsui's attitude."

== Professional career ==
=== Yomiuri Giants ===
Following high school Matsui was drafted by the Yomiuri Giants in the first round. He was given the uniform number 55, which was the single-season home run record held by Sadaharu Oh.

Matsui's first three seasons were unspectacular. His breakout season came in 1996, when he batted .314 with 38 home runs and 99 RBIs. A three-time MVP in the Japanese Central League (1996, 2000, and 2002), Matsui led his team into four Japan Series, winning three titles (1994, 2000 and 2002). He also made nine consecutive all-star games and led the league in home runs and RBIs three times (1998, 2000, and 2002). His single season mark for home runs was 50 in 2002, his final season in Japan. In the ten seasons he played in Japan, Matsui totalled 1268 games played, 4572 AB, 1390 hits, 901 runs, 332 home runs, 889 RBIs, a .304 batting average, and a .582 slugging percentage. His streak of 1,250 consecutive games played was the second longest in Japan.

His first trip to the Japan Series became well known. Because of the 1994–95 Major League Baseball strike, Matsui became known to the American media, as media outlets were covering the Series, which was referred in Sports Illustrated as "the" Fall Classic.

In Japan, Matsui earned the popular nickname "Godzilla." The origin of the name is derisive in nature, in reference to Matsui's skin problems early on in his career, but has since come to represent his powerful hitting. In 2002, he made a cameo in the film Godzilla Against Mechagodzilla.

In 2001, Matsui turned down a $64 million, six-year offer from the Yomiuri Giants, the highest in NPB history.

=== New York Yankees ===
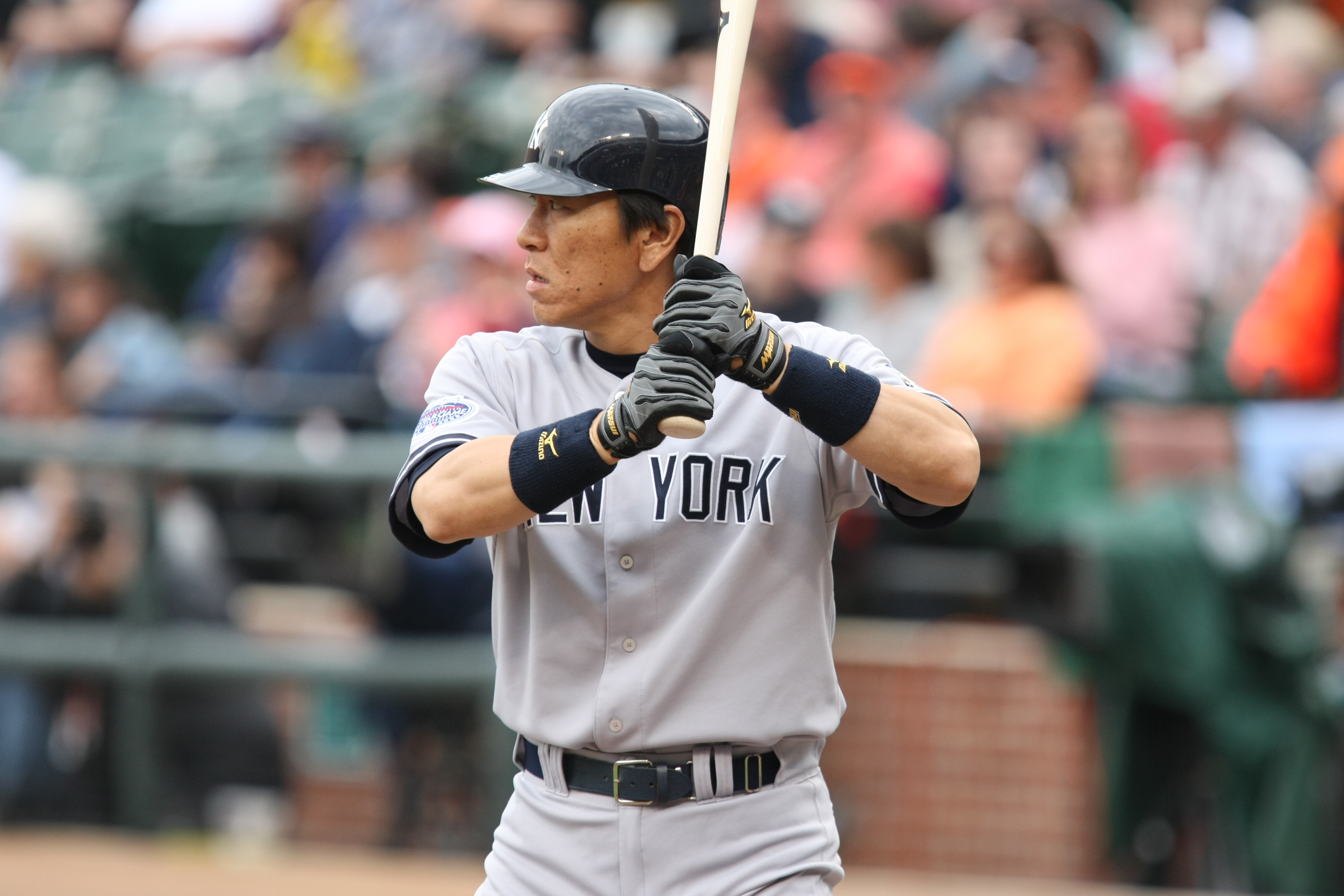
Hideki Matsui batting for the Yankees

Matsui signed a three-year, $21 million contract with the Yankees on December 19, 2002. A parade was held for him in Tokyo to celebrate his signing with the Yankees and many reporters and photographers followed him to MLB from his home in Tokyo.

On March 31, 2003, Matsui made his MLB debut against Toronto Blue Jays in Canada. He became the first Japanese player who made his MLB debut in Canada. He hit an RBI single in his first MLB at-bat and, at the 2003 Yankee home opener, he became the first Yankee to hit a grand slam in his first game at Yankee Stadium. Matsui went on to hit .287 with 16 home runs and 106 RBIs. On defense, he led the AL in errors by an outfielder, with eight. In the 2003 MLB postseason, he became the first Japanese player to hit a home run in the World Series, in Game Two of the 2003 World Series against the Florida Marlins.

Matsui narrowly lost the Rookie of the Year Award to Ángel Berroa after two writers, Jim Souhan and Bill Ballou, refused to include him on their ballots due to his age. Yankees owner George Steinbrenner responded by pointing out this had not prevented either writer from voting for Ichiro Suzuki or Kazuhiro Sasaki, both of whom had previously played in the NPB for several years and were the two oldest players to have received the award, and stated he felt Matsui had been robbed.

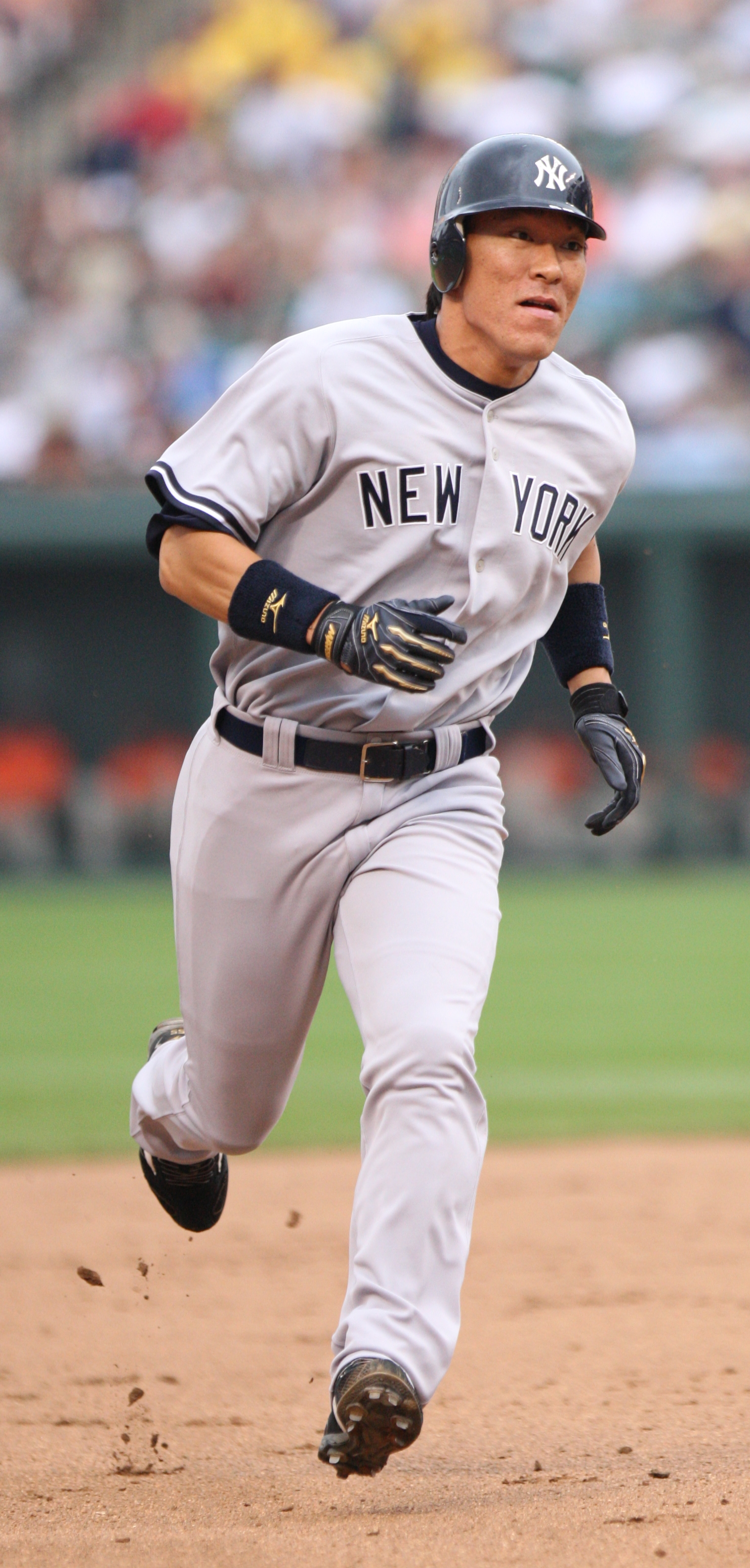
Hideki Matsui rounding the bases

In his second season, Matsui finished 2004 with a .298 average with 31 home runs and 108 RBIs. He was the American League All-Star Final Vote winner in 2004. In 2005, Matsui set MLB career highs with a .305 average and 116 RBIs.

On November 15, 2005, Matsui signed a four-year deal for $52 million, surpassing Ichiro Suzuki as the highest paid Japanese player in baseball, and securing his place with the Yankees through 2009. In 2006, Matsui finished his fourth season with a .302 average with eight home runs and 29 RBIs after missing most of the season due to a wrist injury.

On May 6, 2007, Matsui recorded his 2,000th hit in combined hits in NPB and MLB during a game vs. the Mariners, which earned him a place in Japan's Golden Players Club, reserved for players who have hit 2,000 hits, have 200 wins or have 250 saves professionally. It was originally ruled an error on Raúl Ibañez, who lost track of the ball due to the sun, but a scoring change gave Matsui the hit. Matsui went 2-for-4 that day; the second hit (#2001) was a clean single to right field. On August 5, 2007, Matsui became the first Japanese player in MLB history to hit 100 home runs. The home run came in the bottom of the third inning off Gil Meche of the Kansas City Royals.

In 2007, he was third in the AL with 10 sacrifice flies, and ninth in walks per strikeout (1.00). In the winter of 2007, it was widely reported in the media that the Yankees were in talks to send Matsui to the San Francisco Giants in exchange for one or two pitchers. No deal ever materialized and Matsui remained with the Yankees.

On June 12, 2008, Matsui hit a grand slam on his 34th birthday, helping the Yankees to a 4–1 victory over the A's. Later that month, Matsui went on the disabled list with knee pain. He returned on August 19 against the Toronto Blue Jays and became the team's everyday designated hitter. After the final game at Yankee Stadium, Matsui underwent surgery on his left knee. Through 2008, Matsui batted .294 against right-handed pitchers in his career and .295 against lefties.

On June 12, 2009, Matsui hit a three-run home run on his 35th birthday, giving the Yankees a 7–6 lead over the New York Mets in the sixth inning. On July 20, he hit a walk-off solo home run with one out in the bottom of the ninth against Jim Johnson of the Baltimore Orioles, giving the Yankees their fourth win in a row after the All Star break, their ninth walk-off win, and a tie for first place in the division with the Boston Red Sox. A month later, on August 21, Matsui hit two home runs and drove in a career-high seven runs in the Yankees' unusual 20–11 win over the Boston Red Sox at Fenway Park. He became the first Yankees hitter to ever drive in seven runs in a game at Fenway Park since Lou Gehrig in 1930. Two games later, Matsui would hit two home runs for his third time in just seven games. Matsui was voted by fans as MLB Clutch Performer of the Month Presented by Pepsi for August after his performance through the month. On September 19, Matsui hit his 26th home run of the season, breaking the Yankees' record for home runs in a single season by a designated hitter which was previously held by Don Baylor.

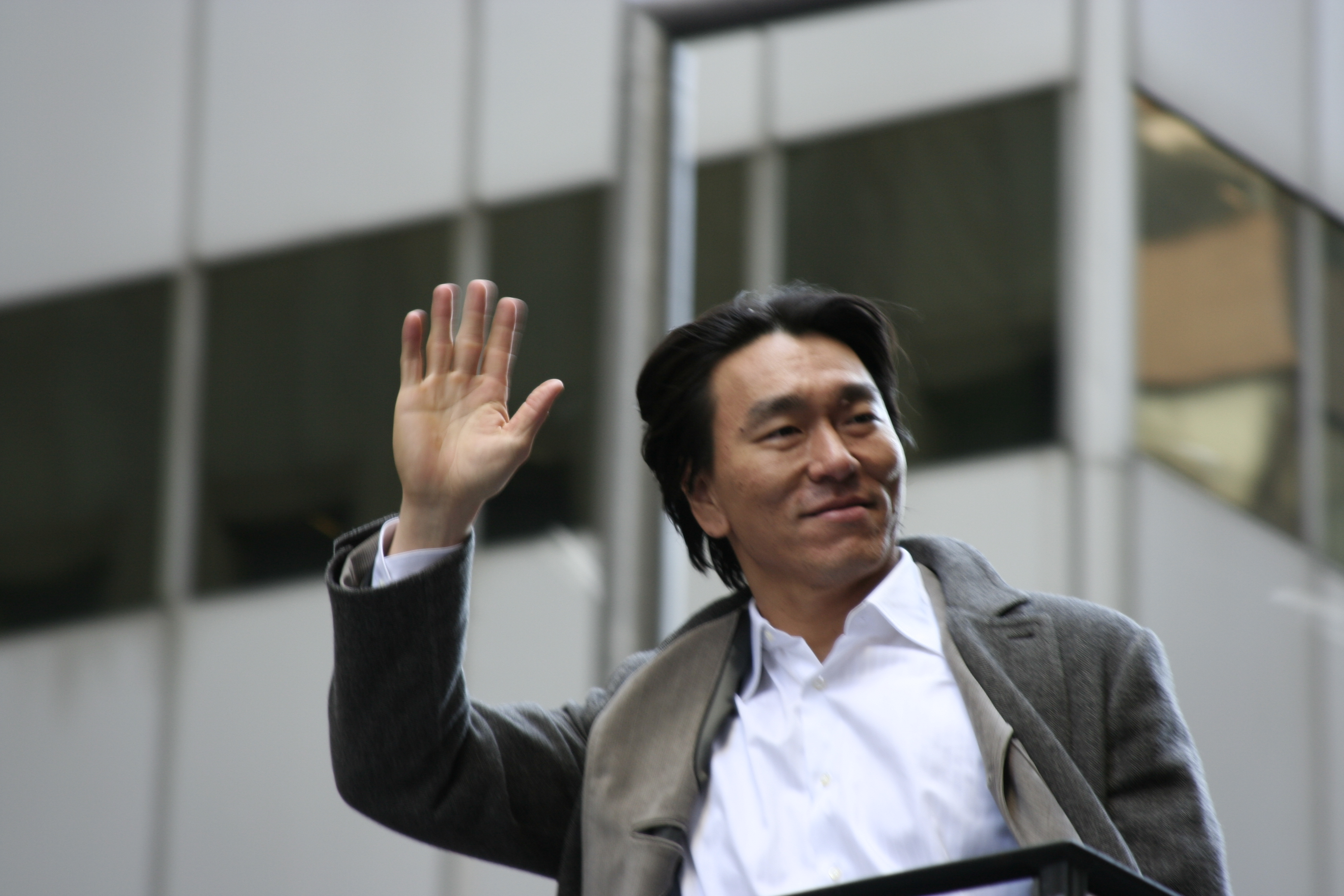
Matsui during the 2009 World Series championship parade

In the 2009 World Series, Matsui helped the Yankees defeat the defending champion Philadelphia Phillies in six games by hitting .615 (8-for-13) with three home runs and 8 RBI, including tying Bobby Richardson's single-game World Series record (Game 3 of the 1960 World Series) with six RBIs in Game 6. Since the designated hitter position was not used in the three games in Philadelphia, Matsui only started the three games in New York; nevertheless, his performance earned him the World Series Most Valuable Player Award. He became the first Japanese-born player to win the award, as well as the first player to win it as a full-time designated hitter in the World Series. He joined his 1994 Japan Series teammate Dan Gladden (1987 and 1991, Minnesota) as players to have won championships in both North America and Japan. Matsui also became the third player in Major League history to bat .500 or above and hit three home runs in the same World Series, joining only Babe Ruth and Lou Gehrig.

=== Los Angeles Angels of Anaheim ===
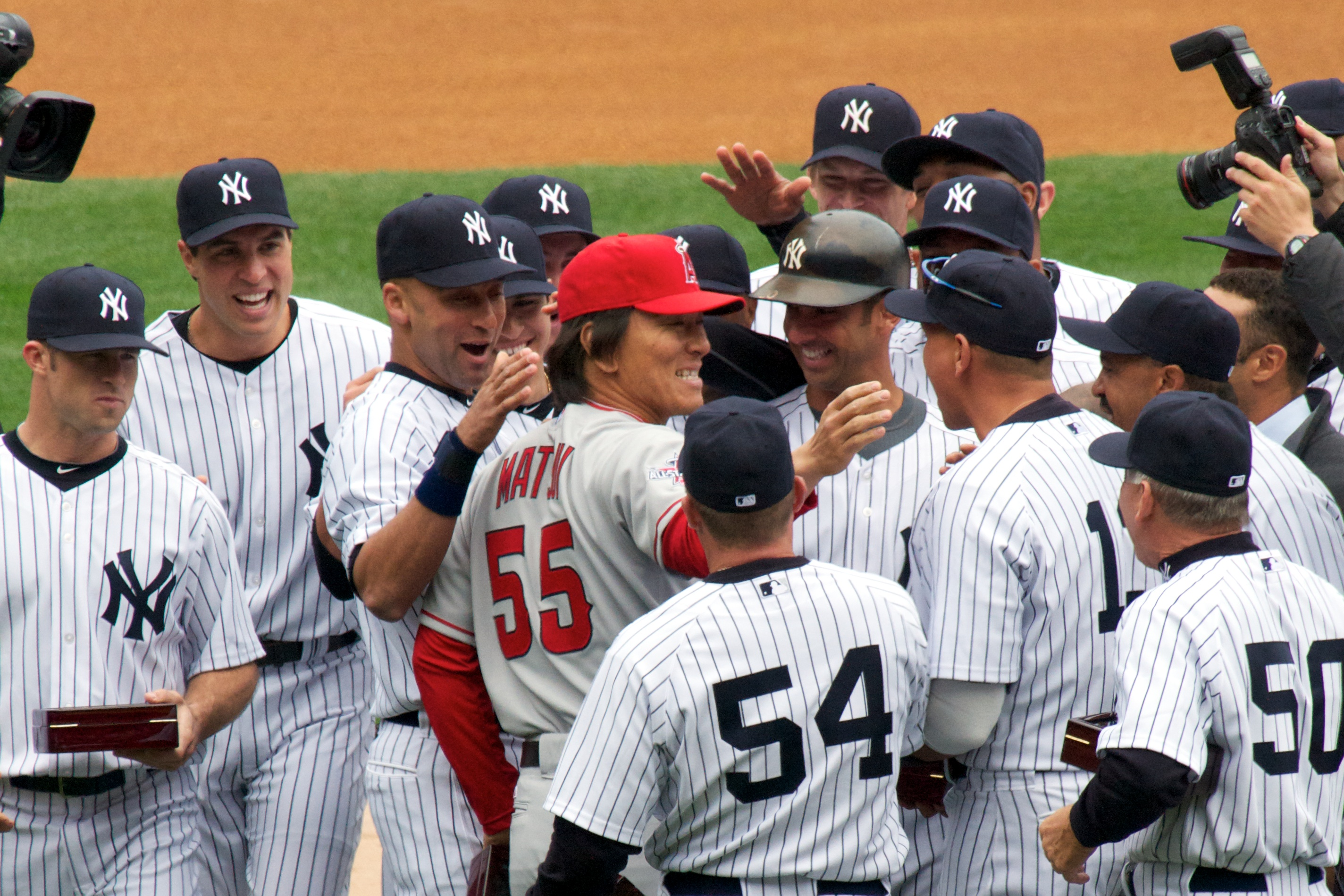
Matsui greeted by his former teammates during the Yankees' 2010 home opener

On December 16, 2009, Matsui agreed to a one-year deal with the Los Angeles Angels of Anaheim worth $6.5 million. He told Yomiuri Shimbun that he "loved the Yankees the best" but that he no longer felt valued and when his agent called to negotiate, "The Yankees had nothing prepared [in terms of contract conditions]." He made up his mind to sign with the Angels quickly. "I really felt their high expectations of me", he said. "They also acknowledged that I want to give fielding a shot."

On Opening Day of the 2010 season, Matsui went 2-for-4 with a home run in the Angels cleanup spot. While playing in 145 games for the Angels, he produced a .274 batting average, 21 home runs and 84 RBIs. Matsui returned to free agent status following the close of the season, and on November 23, 2010, the Angels announced that they would not offer him salary arbitration.

=== Oakland Athletics ===
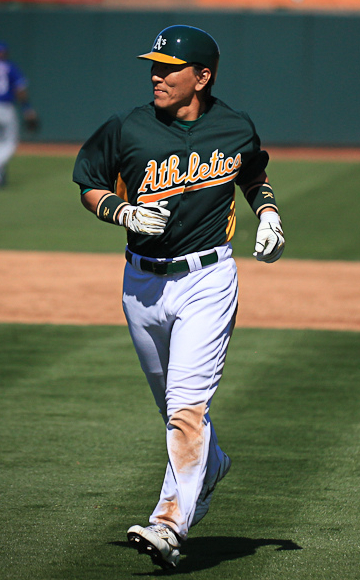
Matsui with the Athletics in 2011

On December 14, 2010, Matsui signed a one-year contract worth $4.25 million with the Oakland Athletics for the 2011 season. On April 3, 2011, Matsui collected career hit number 2,500 (between NPB and MLB) at Oakland–Alameda County Coliseum versus the Seattle Mariners, and on July 20, 2011, Matsui hit career home run number 500 versus the Detroit Tigers at Comerica Park.

=== Tampa Bay Rays ===
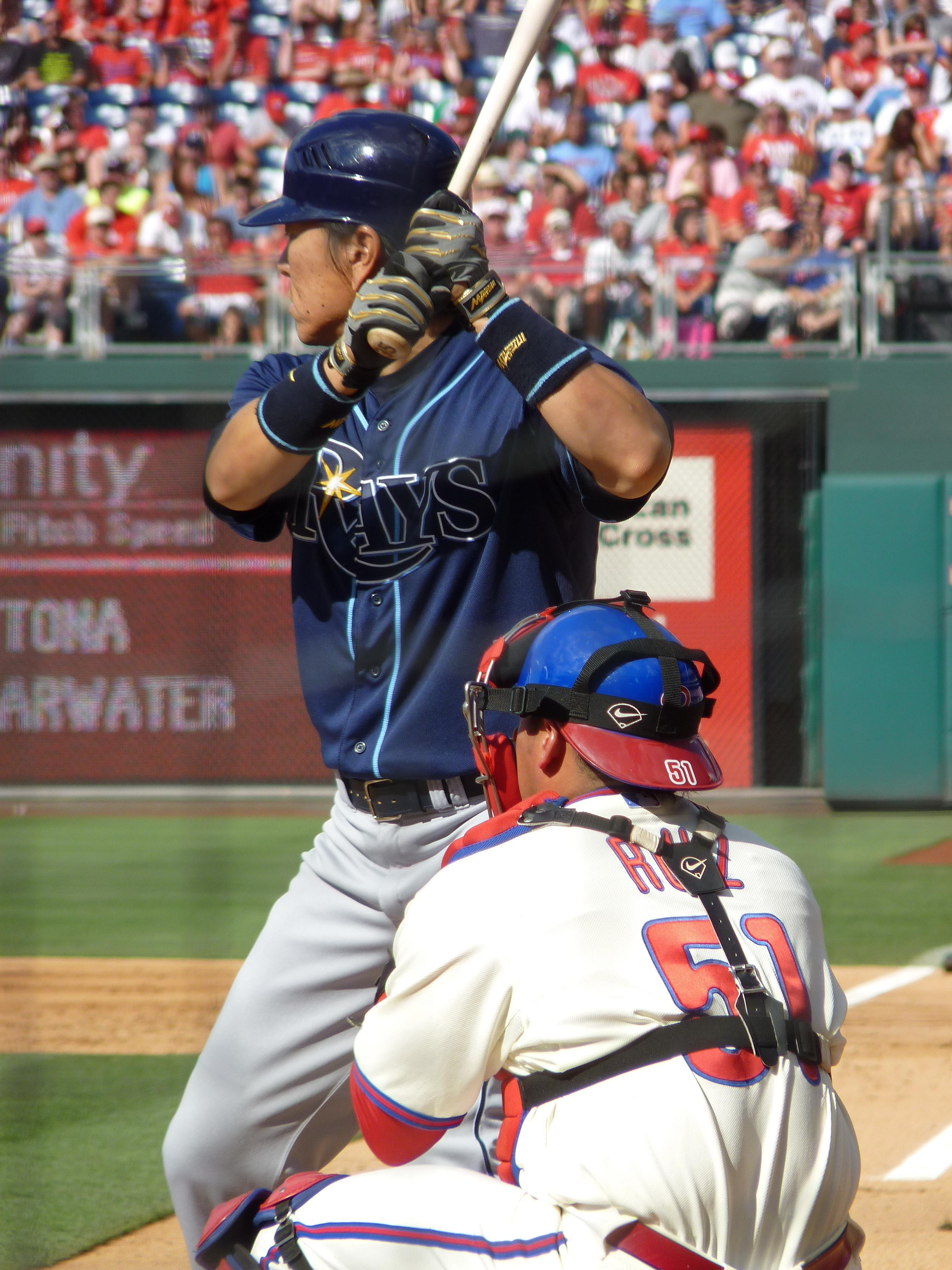
Matsui batting for the Rays in 2012

On April 30, 2012, Matsui signed a minor league contract with the Tampa Bay Rays. He joined the Rays' Triple-A affiliate, the Durham Bulls, on May 15, 2012. On May 28, 2012, it was reported that the Rays were going to call Matsui up for a game against the Chicago White Sox on May 29, 2012. Upon joining the Rays, due to his preferred number 55 belonging to pitcher Matt Moore, he elected to wear uniform number 35 for his former teammate Mike Mussina. On the first pitch of his second at bat against the Chicago White Sox on May 29, 2012, Matsui hit a two-run home run.

In 2012, there were thirty-five members of the Japanese media assigned to report on Matsui.

However, Matsui's hitting was unimpressive during the next two months as he posted a .147 batting average. He was designated for assignment by the Rays on July 25, 2012, and was released on August 1. Upon playing for the Rays, Matsui succeeded in playing 10 top-tier professional seasons in both America (MLB) and Japan (NPB), the first player in history to do so.

=== Playing streak ===
Matsui did not miss a game in his first three seasons with the Yankees, putting together a streak of 518 games played. Before that, he played in 1,250 consecutive games with Yomiuri, for a total professional baseball streak of 1,768. Matsui holds the record for longest streak of consecutive games played to start a Major League Baseball career.

On May 11, 2006, in his 519th game with the Yankees, Matsui fractured his left wrist on an unsuccessful sliding catch in the top of the first inning against the Boston Red Sox. Matsui, despite the injury, threw the ball back to the infield before gripping his wounded wrist in obvious pain. The game did not count toward Matsui's streak, as a player must field for at least half an inning or take an at-bat to be credited with a game played (MLB rule 10.24). Matsui underwent surgery on May 12, 2006, the next day. He returned to the Yankees starting lineup on September 12 against the Tampa Bay Devil Rays, and had an RBI-single in his first at-bat back, and proceeded to go 4 for 4 with a walk and scored twice.

== Retirement ==
On December 27, 2012, Matsui officially announced his retirement from baseball. His retirement ceremony was held on May 5, 2013, at the Tokyo Dome, during which the Japanese government awarded him, and Shigeo Nagashima with the People's Honour Award.

On July 28, 2013, Matsui signed a one-day contract with the New York Yankees, and formally retired as a member of the team, the Yankees organization granting his last wish in honor of his years as a successful player with the team. In 2015, Matsui rejoined the Yankees as a special adviser to general manager Brian Cashman.

On January 15, 2018, Matsui was elected to the Japanese Baseball Hall of Fame with 91.3% of the vote. Elected at the age of 43, he became the youngest player to be inducted to the Hall, breaking a record held by Hideo Nomo.

Matsui was one of the torchbearers in the 2020 Summer Olympics.

== Managerial career ==
On 23 October 2026, the Yomiuri Giants announced that Matsui was appointed their manager for the 2027 season. He succeeded interim manager Hideki Hashigami, who took over the Giants during the 2026 season after manager Shinnosuke Abe resigned in May.

== Charity work ==
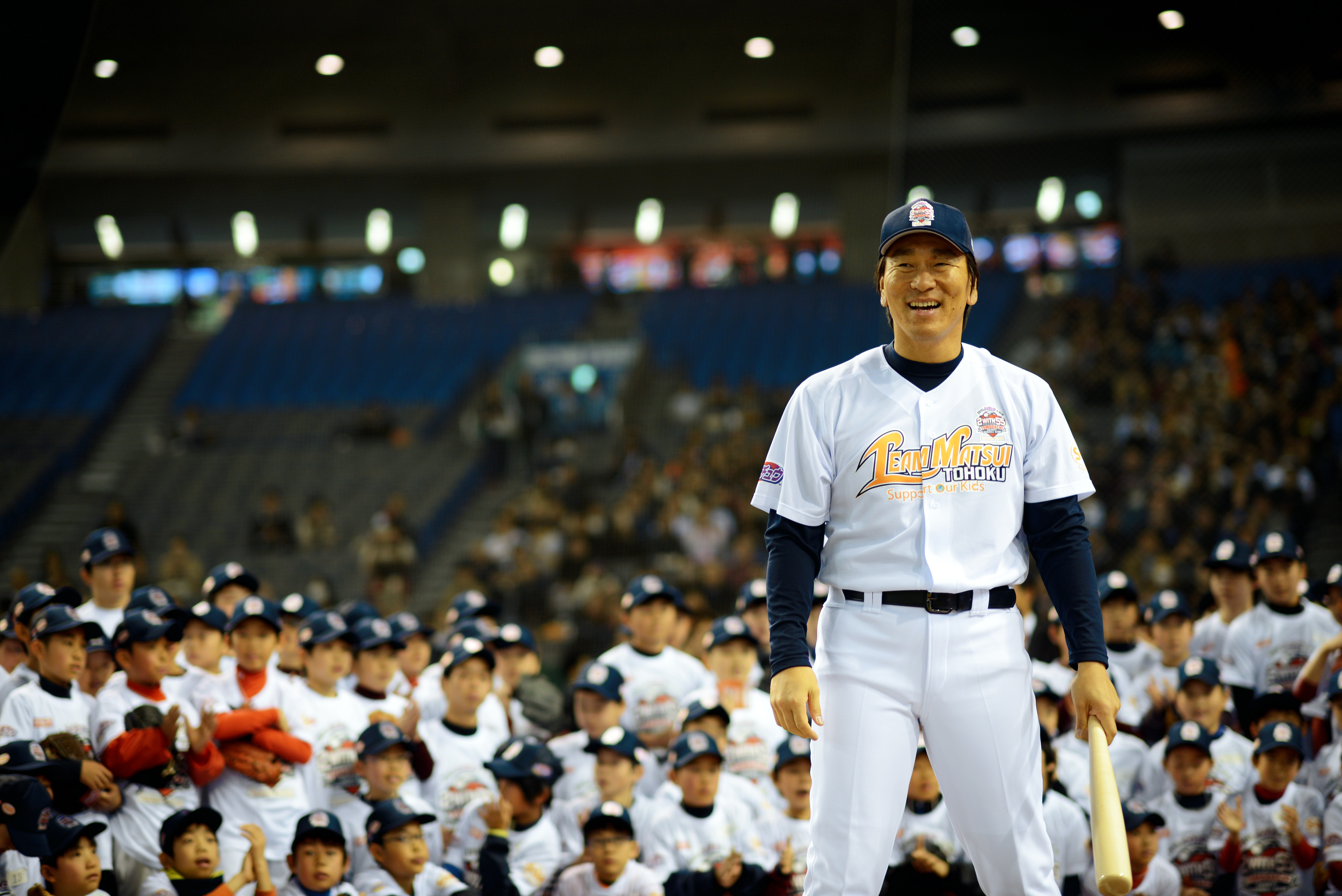
Matsui in 2015 at the Tokyo Dome with children at a baseball game he organized to support the 2011 Tōhoku earthquake and tsunami relief efforts

Matsui donated $500,000 towards charity relief for victims of the December 2004 Indian Ocean tsunami.

Matsui also donated $620,000 to relief efforts for victims of the 2011 earthquake, tsunami, and subsequent Fukushima nuclear disaster in the Tōhoku region of Japan. In March 2015, Matsui and former teammate Derek Jeter held a baseball charity event to support children affected by the 2011 earthquake, tsunami, and nuclear disaster, at the Tokyo Dome. The event included a baseball clinic and a home run derby between Matsui and Jeter.

== Personal life ==
Matsui announced to the press on March 27, 2008, that he had married in a private ceremony in New York. His bride's name was not announced, but it was reported that she was 25 years old and had been formerly working in a "reputable position at a highly respected company". They met in Japan after the 2006 off-season. Matsui's first son was born in the United States around the time of his retirement. As of November 2016, Matsui had an apartment on the Upper West Side of Manhattan and a home in Connecticut, where he was raising his son. In January 2017, his wife gave birth to the couple's second son. He continues to live in New York City as of 2021.

== See also ==
- List of Major League Baseball players from Japan
- History of baseball outside the United States

Preceded by Alex Rodriguez	American League Player of the Month; July 2007	Succeeded by Magglio Ordóñez
