= Athletics at the 2010 Asian Games – Women's 20 kilometres walk =

Women's 20 kilometres walk at the 2010 Asian Games
- Venue: Aoti Main Stadium
- Date: 23 November 2010
- Competitors: 6 from 4 nations

Medalists
gold medal	Liu Hong	China
silver medal	Masumi Fuchise	Japan
bronze medal	Li Yanfei	China

The women's 20 kilometres walk event at the 2010 Asian Games was held in Aoti Main Stadium, Guangzhou, China on 23 November.

== Schedule ==
All times are China Standard Time (UTC+08:00)

Date	Time	Event
Tuesday, 23 November 2010	09:05	Final

== Records ==
Prior to this competition, the existing world, Asian and Games records were as follows.

World Record	Olimpiada Ivanova (RUS)	1:25:41	Helsinki, Finland	7 August 2005
Asian Record	Wang Yan (CHN)	1:26:22	Guangzhou, China	19 December 2001
Games Record	Liu Hong (CHN)	1:32:19	Doha, Qatar	7 December 2006

== Results ==
Rank	Athlete	Time	Notes
1st place, gold medalist(s)	Liu Hong (CHN)	1:30:06	GR
2nd place, silver medalist(s)	Masumi Fuchise (JPN)	1:30:34	
3rd place, bronze medalist(s)	Li Yanfei (CHN)	1:32:34	
4	Mayumi Kawasaki (JPN)	1:35:13	
5	Jeon Yeong-eun (KOR)	1:40:24	
6	Kay Khing Myo Tun (MYA)	1:46:45	
