= Jim Souhan =

American journalist

Jim Souhan is a sports journalist for the Minneapolis Star Tribune and a member of the Baseball Writers' Association of America since 1993.

== Professional career ==
He was named one of the top 10 sports columnists in America by the Associated Press Sports Editors of America in 2008. He also appears on Fox Sports North television and KSTP AM-1500 radio. He runs the malepatternpodcasts.com Network, which includes personalities like Roy Smalley Jr. and Michael Russo.

In 2010, Souhan called out the Xavier men's basketball team for having a mid-major basketball team, favoring the No. 11 Minnesota Gophers over the No. 6 seeded Xavier Musketeers. Xavier won the game, and in the post game press conference, Xavier Coach Chris Mack called out Souhan for his favoring of Minnesota: "Jim Souhan, however you pronounce his name, from the Star-Tribune, thanks for the motivation to tell our kids that we should be fodder against Minnesota."

After Minnesota head football coach Jerry Kill suffered his fourth game day seizure in his tenure at Minnesota during halftime of a game against Western Illinois on September 13, 2013, Souhan wrote a column in which he called for Kill to step down. In the column, Souhan stated that "No one who buys a ticket to TCF Bank Stadium should be rewarded with the sight of a middle-aged man writhing on the ground." This statement was criticized by epilepsy awareness advocates for its insensitivity towards people who have epilepsy.

== Controversy ==
Souhan stirred some controversy when he and fellow sports writer Bill Ballou refused to include Hideki Matsui on their Rookie of the Year ballots due to his age. Yankee owner George Steinbrenner responded by pointing out that this had not prevented either writer from voting for Ichiro Suzuki or Kazuhiro Sasaki, both of whom had previously played in the NPB for several years and were the two oldest players to have received the award, and stated that he felt Matsui had been robbed.
