= Sachiko Konishi =

Japanese racewalker

Personal information
- Native name: 小西 祥子
- Nationality: Japanese
- Born: 4 February 1982 (age 44) Osaka, Japan
- Height: 1.54 m (5 ft 1/2 in)
- Weight: 42 kg (93 lb)

Sport
- Sport: Athletics
- Event: Race walking

Achievements and titles
- Personal bests: 10 km walk: 44:09 (2007); 20 km walk: 1:29:39 (2009)

Sachiko Konishi (小西 祥子, Konishi Sachiko; born 4 February 1982 in Osaka) is a female Japanese race walker. Konishi represented Japan at the 2008 Summer Olympics in Beijing, where she competed for the women's 20 km race walk, along with her compatriot Mayumi Kawasaki. She finished the race in twenty-sixth place with a time of 1:32:21, two seconds behind Greece's Evaggelia Xinou.
