= Terai, Ishikawa =

Dissolved municipality in Ishikawa prefecture, Japan

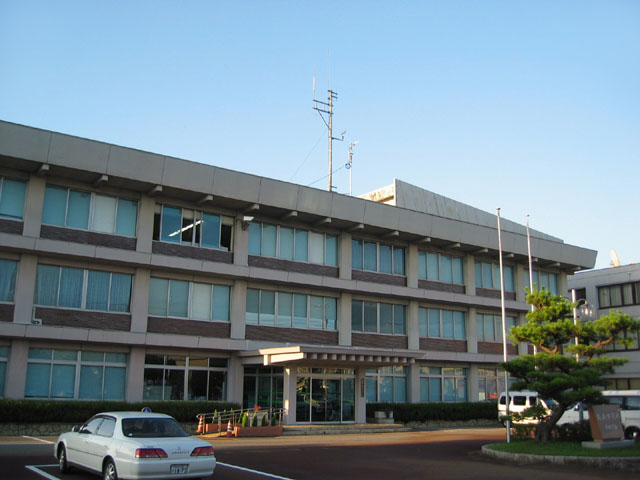
Town office.

Terai (寺井町, Terai-machi) was a town located in Nomi District, Ishikawa Prefecture, Japan.

As of 2003, the town had an estimated population of 15,874 and a density of 1,207.15 per km^{2}. The total area was 13.15 km^{2}.

On February 1, 2005, Terai, along with the towns of Neagari and Tatsunokuchi (all from Nomi District), was merged to create the city of Nomi and no longer exists as an independent municipality.
