= Neagari =

Dissolved municipality in Ishikawa prefecture, Japan

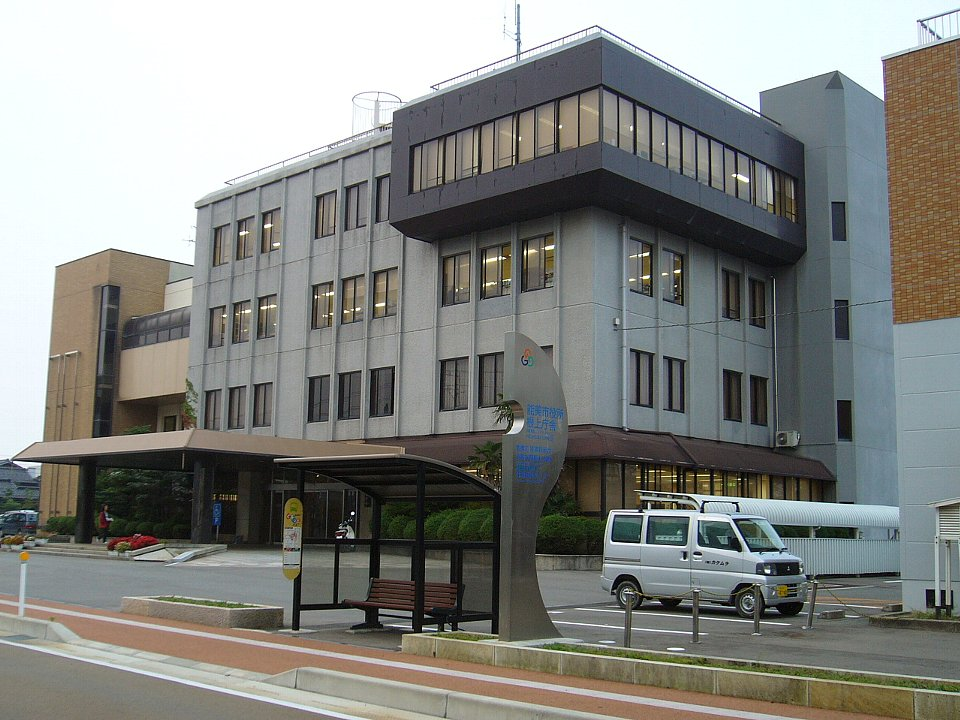
Town office.

Neagari (根上町, Neagari-machi) was a town located in Nomi District, Ishikawa Prefecture, Japan.

As of 2003, the town had an estimated population of 15,880 and a density of 1,170.23 persons per km^{2}. The total area was 13.57 km^{2}.

On February 1, 2005, Neagari, along with the towns of Tatsunokuchi and Terai (all from Nomi District), was merged to create the city of Nomi and no longer exists as an independent municipality.

== People ==
- Shigeki Mori, former mayor, father of ex-prime minister Yoshiro Mori.
- Hideki Matsui, Former MLB Designated Hitter, Outfielder, and manager.
