= Tatsunokuchi, Ishikawa =

Dissolved municipality in Ishikawa prefecture, Japan

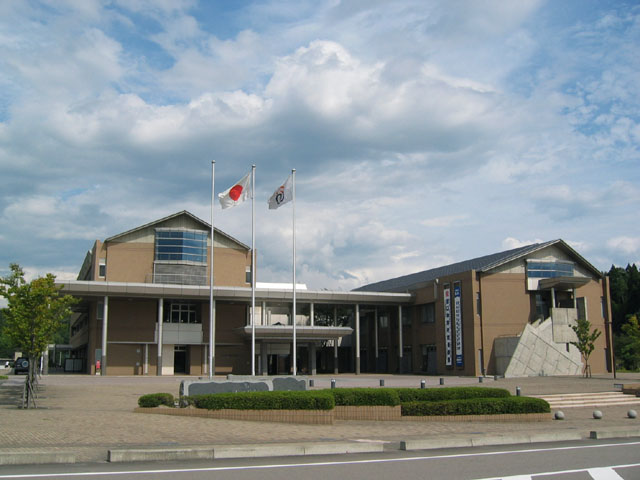
Town office.

Tatsunokuchi (辰口町, Tatsunokuchi-machi) was a town located in Nomi District, Ishikawa Prefecture, Japan.

As of 2003, the town had an estimated population of 14,804 and a density of 259.13 persons per km^{2}. The total area was 57.13 km^{2}.

On February 1, 2005, Tatsunokuchi, along with the towns of Neagari and Terai (all from Nomi District), was merged to create the city of Nomi and no longer exists as an independent municipality.
