= Nomi District =

District in Ishikawa prefecture, Japan

Nomi District in Ishikawa Prefecture.

Nomi (能美郡, Nomi-gun) is a district located in Ishikawa Prefecture, Japan.

As of 2003 population data but following the merger forming the city of Nomi, the district has an estimated population of 5,387 with a density of 364.97 persons per km^{2}. The total area is 14.76 km^{2}.

== Municipalities ==
The district consists of one town:

- Kawakita (Note: Classified as a town.)

== History ==
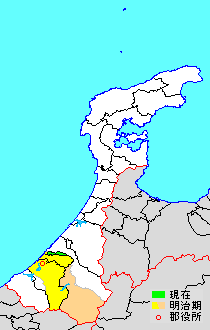
Map showing original extent of Nomi District in Ishikawa Prefecture: * yellow - areas formerly within the district borders during the early Meiji period: 1. Kawakita-machi

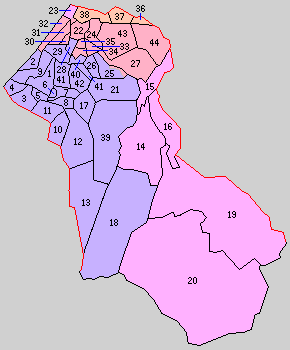
Colored areas are in this district.

=== Recent mergers ===
- On February 1, 2005 - The towns of Neagari, Tatsunokuchi, and Terai were merged to form the city of Nomi.
