= Wadayama-Matsujiyama Kofun Cluster =

- 和田山・末寺山古墳群 (Japanese)
- Wadayama-Matsujiyama Kofun Cluster Wadayama-Matsujiyama Kofun Cluster (Japan)
- 36°26′50″N 136°30′34″E
- Type: kofun
- Periods: Kofun
- Location: Nomi, Ishikawa, Japan
- Region: Hokuriku region

Site notes
- Owner: National Historic Site
- Public access: Yes

Wadayama-Matsujiyama Kofun Cluster (和田山・末寺山古墳群, Wadayama-Matsujiyama kofun-gun) is a set of several groups of kofun burial mounds located in what is now part of the city of Nomi, Ishikawa in the Hokuriku region of Japan. The site was collectively designated a National Historic Site of Japan in 1975.

== Overview ==
The Wadayama-Matsujiyama Kofun group consists of 28 kofun, spanning the entire range of the early to late Kofun period. The kofun are in a variety of styles, including rectangular domed, keyhole-shaped, and other varieties, some with moats. The largest of the tombs has a length of 140 meters. The burial chambers tended to be simple, clay-floored chambers typical of the Hokuriku region.

In several tombs, grave goods included armor, swords, bronze mirrors, horse fittings and harnesses, along with a very large amount of Sue ware pottery. Some of the Sue ware pottery was to have come from kilns in the Osaka area, including a strong connection between the ancient nobility in this region with the Kansai region.

== See also ==
- List of Historic Sites of Japan (Ishikawa)
