= Michael Russo (sportswriter) =

American sports journalist

Michael Russo is an American sports journalist for The Athletic. His primary beat is the National Hockey League (NHL) and the Minnesota Wild. He previously worked for the Minneapolis Star Tribune from 2005 to 2017.

== Career ==
Russo was a vice president of the Professional Hockey Writers' Association and is currently the Western Conference Representative for the PHWA and Chair of the Minnesota chapter of the PHWA. He has been named "Minnesota Sportswriter of the Year" five times (2011, 2012, 2015, 2019 and 2024) by the National Sportscasters and Sportswriters Association, which has been renamed the National Sports Media Association.

In 2017, he was named the inaugural winner of the Red Fisher Award, which recognizes to the top overall beat reporter in the NHL, as voted by his peers.

He has routinely been a guest on radio stations KSTP (AM) (aka 1500 ESPN) and KFAN (AM). He co-hosted the show Russo Radio on 1500 ESPN and is now exclusively on KFAN. He also is an exclusive contributor to Bally Sports North and co-hosts a podcast called the "Worst Seats in the House" with Minnesota Wild television play-by-play man Anthony LaPanta.

Russo has a Twitter account where he tweets Wild and NHL information, @RussoHockey. He was a selected journalist by NHL.com for the 2010 Olympics, used to be a columnist for Versus.com and occasionally writes for The Hockey News.

From 1990–2005, Russo worked for the South Florida Sun-Sentinel and primarily reported on the Florida Panthers. In 2000, Russo co-authored the Sports Illustrated for Kids book Rising Stars: The 10 Best Young Players in the NHL.
