= Nomi, Ishikawa =

Nomi 能美市
- City
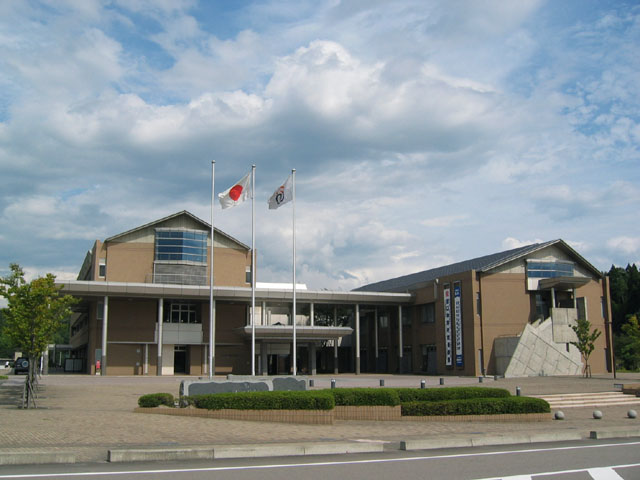
- Nomi City Hall

- Flag Seal

- Location of Nomi in Ishikawa Prefecture

- Coordinates: 36°26′49.2″N 136°33′14.7″E
- Country: Japan
- Region: Chūbu (Hokuriku)
- Prefecture: Ishikawa Prefecture

Government
  - Mayor: Toshiaki Ide

Area
  - Total: 84.14 km^{2} (32.49 sq mi)

Population (March 1, 2018)
  - Total: 50,132
  - Density: 595.8/km^{2} (1,543/sq mi)
- Time zone: UTC+9 (Japan Standard Time)
- City symbols
- Phone number: 0761-58-1111
- Address: 110 Raimaru-machi, Nomi-shi, Ishikawa-ken 926-8611
- Website: Official website

Nomi (能美市, Nomi-shi) is a city located in Ishikawa Prefecture, Japan. As of 1 March 2018, the city had an estimated population of 50,132 in 18,585 households, and a population density of 600 persons per km^{2}. The total area of the city was 84.14 square kilometres (32.49 sq mi).

== Geography ==
Nomi is located in southwestern Ishikawa Prefecture and is bordered by the Sea of Japan to the east.

=== Neighbouring municipalities ===
- Ishikawa Prefecture
  - Hakusan
  - Kawakita
  - Komatsu

=== Climate ===
Nomi has a humid subtropical climate (Köppen Cfa) characterized by mild summers and cold winters with heavy snowfall. The average annual temperature in Nomi is 14.1 °C. The average annual rainfall is 2,527 mm with September as the wettest month. The temperatures are highest on average in August, at around 26.8 °C, and lowest in January, at around 2.7 °C.

== Demographics ==
Per Japanese census data, the population of Nomi has recently plateaued after a long period of growth.

Historical population
Year	Pop.	±%
1970	32,933	—
1980	37,253	+13.1%
1990	39,934	+7.2%
2000	45,077	+12.9%
2010	48,680	+8.0%
2020	48,523	−0.3%

== History ==
The area around Nomi was part of ancient Kaga Province and contains numerous Kofun period ruins. The area became part Kaga Domain under the Edo period Tokugawa shogunate. Following the Meiji restoration, the area was organised into Nomi District, Ishikawa. The town of Nomi was established with the creation of the modern municipalities system on April 1, 1889.

The modern city of Nomi was established on February 1, 2005, from the merger of the towns of Neagari, Tatsunokuchi and Terai.

== Government ==
Nomi has a mayor-council form of government with a directly elected mayor and a unicameral city legislature of 17 members.

== Economy ==
Former Terai town was a noted centre of Kutani ware ceramics production in the past. Manufacturing of electrical components and textiles are major contributors to the modern local economy.

== Education ==
Nomi has eight public elementary schools and three middle schools operated by the city government, and one public high school operated by the Ishikawa Prefectural Board of Education. There is also one private high school. The Japan Advanced Institute of Science and Technology (JAIST Hokuriku) is also located in Nomi.

== Transportation ==
=== Railway ===
Effective 16 March 2024, JR West no longer operates in Nomi as its operations on the Hokuriku Main Line have since been transferred to the IR Ishikawa Railway.

IR Ishikawa Railway

- Nomi-Neagari

=== Highway ===
- Hokuriku Expressway

National Route 8
National Route 157

== Sister cities ==
- Shelekhov, Irkutsk Oblast, Russia

== Local attractions ==
- Hideki Matsui Baseball Museum (ja:松井秀喜ベースボールミュージアム)
- Ishikawa Zoo (ja:いしかわ動物園)
- Tatsunokuchi Onsen (辰口温泉) - Spa.
- Tedori Fish Land (ja:手取フィッシュランド)
- Tumulus Akitsune-yama - Keyhole-shaped tomb.
- Tumulus Wada-yama and Matsuji-yama

=== Local events ===
- Asian Race Walking Championships, held annually

== Noted people from Nomi ==
- Hideki Matsui, baseball player
- Shigeki Mori, town mayor of Neagari - Mori was responsible for Neagari's sister town relationship with Shelekhov, Russia, developing a bilateral dialogue to improve the gravesites of Soviet soldiers in Japan and Japanese soldiers in Siberia. He visited Shelekhov more than 15 times during his 35 years in office, and was buried there following his death. His son, Yoshiro Mori, became prime minister and made major strides in Russo-Japanese relations.
- Yoshirō Mori, former prime minister
- Mamoru Sasaki, Japanese TV and film screenwriter
- Yusuke Suzuki, racewalker

== See also ==
- Wadayama-Matsujiyama Kofun Cluster
