= Shigeki Mori =

Japanese politician

- 森 茂喜
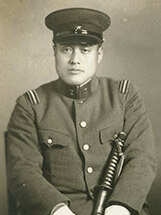
- Mori in 1937

Mayor of Neagari
- In office 10 July 1953 – 1 April 1989
- Preceded by: Ichiji Shinkawa
- Succeeded by: Shōichi Okamoto

Member of the Neagari Town Council
- In office 1947–1953

Personal details
- Born: 27 March 1910 Neagari, Ishikawa, Japan
- Died: 19 November 1989 (aged 79) Neagari, Ishikawa, Japan
- Party: Independent
- Children: Yoshirō Mori
- Education: Waseda University

Shigeki Mori (森 茂喜, Mori Shigeki; 27 March 1910 – 19 November 1989) was a Japanese businessman and politician, mayor of Neagari, Ishikawa Prefecture, Japan, and the father of former Japanese prime minister Yoshirō Mori.

During his term, he developed a relationship with the Siberian town of Shelekhov, particularly a bilateral dialogue to improve the gravesites of Soviet soldiers in Japan and Japanese soldiers in Siberia; he was so close to Russia that Japanese authorities monitored him closely as a potential communist sympathizer. He visited Shelekhov more than 15 times during his 35 years in office, and part of his ashes were buried there following his death.
