= Liu Hong (race walker) =

Chinese racewalker (born 1987)

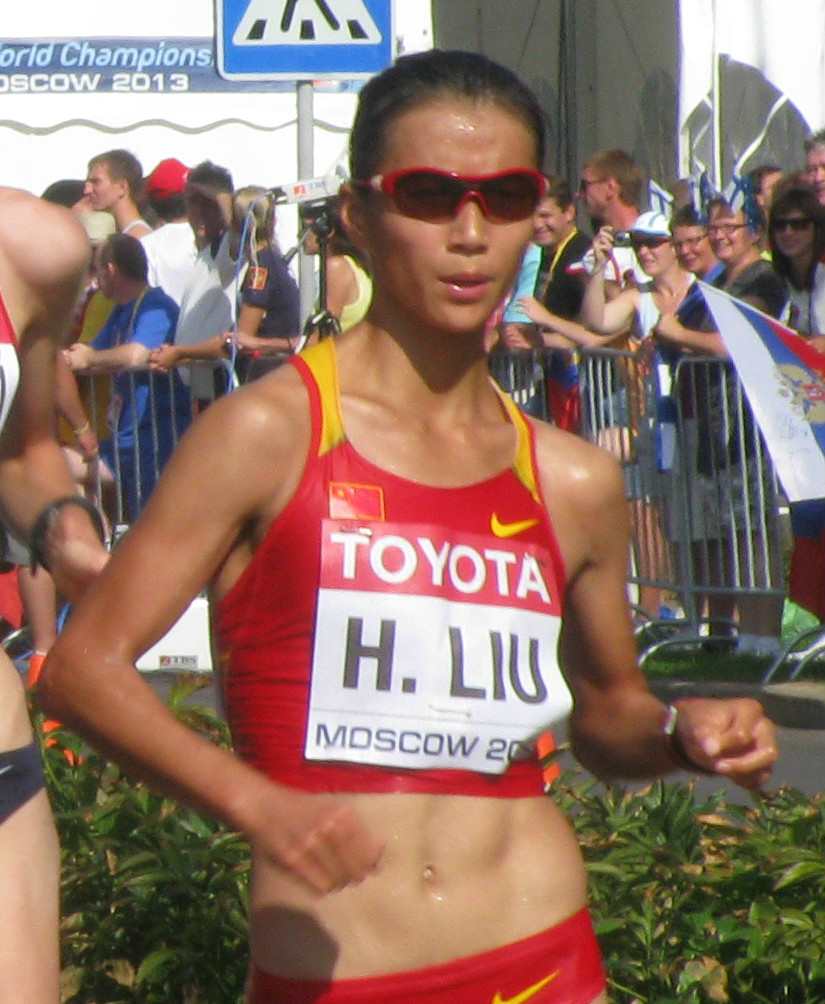
- Liu in 2013

Personal information
- Nationality: Chinese
- Born: 12 May 1987 (age 39) Anfu County, China
- Height: 1.60 m (5 ft 3 in)
- Weight: 50 kg (110 lb)

Sport
- Country: China
- Sport: Athletics
- Event: 20 km race walk
Medal record
Women's athletics
Representing China
Olympic Games
Gold medal – first place	2016 Rio de Janeiro	20 km walk
Silver medal – second place	2012 London	20 km walk
Bronze medal – third place	2020 Tokyo	20 km walk
World Championships
Gold medal – first place	2011 Daegu	20 km walk
Gold medal – first place	2013 Moscow	20 km walk
Gold medal – first place	2015 Beijing	20 km walk
Gold medal – first place	2019 Doha	20 km walk
Silver medal – second place	2009 Berlin	20 km walk
Asian Games
Gold medal – first place	2006 Doha	20 km walk
Gold medal – first place	2010 Guangzhou	20 km walk

Liu Hong (Chinese: 刘虹; pinyin: Liú Hóng; born 12 May 1987) is a retired Chinese race walker. She is the former world record holder over the Olympic 20km distance with a time of 1:24:38 hours, set in 2015.

Liu has won multiple medals in the World Championships in Athletics, including four gold medals in 2011, 2013, 2015, and 2019 and a silver medal in 2009. She placed fourth at the Summer Olympics in 2008 and was retrospectively upgraded to silver in 2012 Olympic 20 km racewalking. Liu is the 2016 Olympic 20 km racewalking gold medalist. Liu is a two-time gold medalist at the Asian Games, winning in 2006 and 2010. She was the runner-up at the IAAF World Race Walking Cup in 2014. In her early career, she was the World Junior Champion in 2006.

== Career ==
She first came to prominence by winning the World Junior and Asian Games titles in 2006. After a poor global debut at the 2007 World Championships in Athletics (19th), she rebounded with a fourth-place finish at the 2008 Beijing Olympics. However, since Russia's Olga Kaniskina was disqualified in March 2016 for doping, Liu is expected to be awarded the bronze medal. She secured her first major medal at the 2009 World Championships in Athletics, taking the bronze medal. Later that year she took the national title at the 11th Chinese National Games.

Liu retained her title at the 2010 Asian Games and broke the Games record with a time of 1:30:06 hours. She opened her 2011 season with a win on the 2011 racewalking circuit at the Memorial Mario Albisetti. She followed this with a win in Taicang, equalling her personal best in the process. A third circuit win came in Dublin that year. She won the gold medal at the 2011 World Championships in Athletics. Liu broke the Asian record for the 20 km walk in Taicang in 2012, defeating Wang Yan's decade-old record with a time of 1:25:46 hours.

She placing third behind Qieyang Shenjie who also broke her Asian record, at the 2012 London Olympics. Liu won at the 2012 IAAF World Race Walking Challenge Final, however, and defeated Qieyang en route to breaking Jin Bingjie's 22-year-old Asian record for the 5000 m walk at the Chinese University Games. She set an event record in her first race of 2013, winning the Memorial Albisetti in a time of 1:27:06 hours.

She broke the world record for the 20 km walk at the Gran Premio Cantones de La Coruña. Taking advantage of warm conditions, she completed the distance in 1:24:38 hours, walking the second 10 km faster than the first, to improve the world record by 24 seconds. This was the fastest time ever, also beating Olimpiada Ivanova and Olga Kaniskina's times that were not ratified as records due to a lack of international judges.

After testing positive for higenamine in May 2016, she was banned from 13 June to 13 July 2016.

She won the gold medal with 1:28:35 in women's 20 km walk at Rio Olympic Games on 19 August 2016.

After a year off competition to have a baby, in 2019 she became the first woman ever to finish the 50 kilometer walk in less than four hours, finishing in 3 hours, 59 minutes and 15 seconds at the Chinese Race Walk Grand Prix.

Later that year, she won her third gold medal in the 20 km walk at the 2019 World Championships in Athletics in Doha, Qatar.

On 19 August 2026, Liu announced her retirement.

== International competitions ==
Year	Competition	Venue	Position	Event	Notes
Representing China
2006	World Junior Championships	Beijing, China	1st	10,000 m	45:12.84
2006	World Race Walking Cup	A Coruña, Spain	6th	20 km	1:28:59
2006	Asian Games	Doha, Qatar	1st	20 km	1:32.19
2007	World Championships	Osaka, Japan	19th	20 km	1:36:40
2008	Olympic Games	Beijing, China	4th	20 km	1:27:17
2009	World Championships	Berlin, Germany	2nd	20 km	1:29:10
2010	World Race Walking Cup	Chihuahua, Mexico	13th	20 km	1:36:34
2010	Asian Games	Guangzhou, China	1st	20 km	1:30:06
2011	World Championships	Daegu, South Korea	1st	20 km	1:30:00
2012	Olympic Games	London, United Kingdom	2nd	20 km	1:26:00
2013	World Championships	Moscow, Russia	1st	20 km	1:28:10
2014	World Race Walking Cup	Taicang, China	2nd	20 km	1:26:58
2015	World Championships	Beijing, China	1st	20 km	1:27:45
2016	Olympic Games	Rio de Janeiro, Brazil	1st	20 km	1:28:35
2019	World Championships	Doha, Qatar	1st	20 km	1:32:53
2021	Olympic Games	Tokyo, Japan	3rd	20 km	1:29:57
