= Kawakita =

Kawakita 川北町
- Town
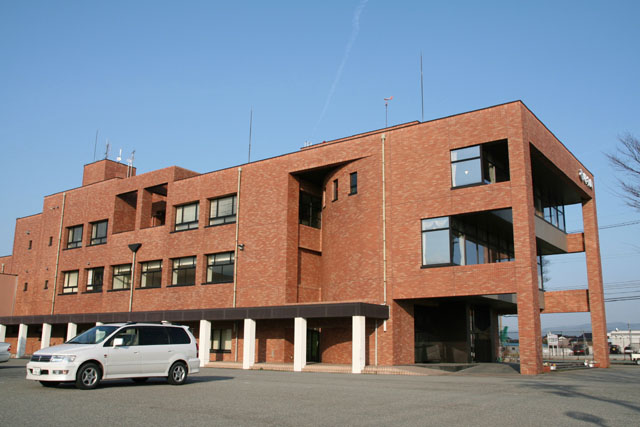
- Kawakita Town Hall

- Flag Seal

- Location of Kawakita in Ishikawa Prefecture

- Coordinates: 36°28′7″N 136°32′32.6″E
- Country: Japan
- Region: Chūbu; Hokuriku
- Prefecture: Ishikawa
- District: Nomi

Area
  - Total: 14.64 km^{2} (5.65 sq mi)

Population (March 1, 2018)
  - Total: 6,282
  - Density: 429.1/km^{2} (1,111/sq mi)
- Time zone: UTC+9 (Japan Standard Time)
- City symbols
- Tree: Zelkova serrata
- Flower: Dianthus
  - Bird: Eurasian skylark
- Phone number: 076-277-1111
- Address: 174 Hitoshiya, Kawakita-machi, Nomi-gun, Ishikawa-ken 923-1295
- Website: Official website

Kawakita (川北町, Kawakita-machi) is a town located in Nomi District, Ishikawa Prefecture, Japan. As of 31 January 2018, the town had an estimated population of 6,282 in 1939 households, and a population density of 430 persons per km^{2}. The total area of the town was 14.64 square kilometres (5.65 sq mi).

== Geography ==
Kawakita occupies the northern bank of the Tedori River, sandwiched between the cities of Hakusan to the north and Nomi to the south. It is flatland, subject to flooding. The town has a humid subtropical climate (Köppen Cfa) characterized by mild summers and cold winters with heavy snowfall. The average annual temperature in Kawakita is 14.2 °C. The average annual rainfall is 2535 mm with September as the wettest month. The temperatures are highest on average in August, at around 26.7 °C, and lowest in January, at around 2.8 °C.

=== Neighbouring municipalities ===
- Ishikawa Prefecture
  - Hakusan
  - Nomi

== Demographics ==
Per Japanese census data, the population of Kawakita has remained relatively stable apart from an uptick in the 2000s.

Historical population
Year	Pop.	±%
1970	4,267	—
1980	4,256	−0.3%
1990	4,554	+7.0%
2000	4,922	+8.1%
2010	6,147	+24.9%
2020	6,135	−0.2%

== History ==
The area around Kawakita was part of ancient Kaga Province. The area became part of Kaga Domain under the Edo period Tokugawa shogunate. Following the Meiji restoration, the area was organised into Nomi District, Ishikawa. The villages of Nakajima, Kusabuka, and Sunagawa were founded on April 1, 1889, with the establishment of the modern municipalities system. These three villages merged on Augsu 5, 1907 to form the village of Kawakita. Kawakita was raised to town status on April 1, 1980.

== Economy ==
Agriculture and the manufacture of electrical components is important to the local economy.

== Education ==
Kawakita has three public elementary schools and one public middle school operated by the town government. The town does not have a public high school.

== Transportation ==
=== Railway ===
- The town does not have any passenger rail service.

=== Highway ===
National Route 8

== Local attractions ==
- Kawakita Festival
