= List of dams in Ishikawa Prefecture =

The following is a list of dams in Ishikawa Prefecture, Japan.

== List ==
Name	Location	Opened	Height (metres)	Image
Akase Dam		1978	38	
Dainichigawa Dam		1976	59.9	
Fukumitsu Dam		1986	36.5	
Hakkagawa Dam			52	
Io Dam		2001	58.8	
Iwasaka Dam		1984	31.7	
Jike Dam		1991	35.4	
Kamiterazu Dam		1965	19.5	
Kitakawachi Dam			47	
Kutani Dam		2005	75.8	
Mikohara Dam		1942	23.7	
Miyata Dam		1979	22.1	
Morohashi Dam		1986	35.2	
Oguchi Dam				
Ohtsubogawa Dam		1992	20.3	
Ohzsemachi Dam		1954	18	
Oya Dam		1992	56.5	
Saigawa Dam			72	
Shingu Dam		1955	25.4	
Shinuchikawa Dam		1984	18.9	
Shiogawa Bosai Dam		1956	24	
Tane Dam		1973	30	
Tatsumi Dam			47	
Tedorigawa Dam		1979	153	
Tetorigawa No.2 Dam		1979	37.5	
Tetorigawa No.3 Dam		1978	50	
Teradagawa Dam		2007	26.7	
Uchikawa Dam			81	
Wagatani Dam		1964	56.5	
Wakayama Dam		1963	25.4	
Yamaguchi Bosai Dam		1970	27	
Yoshinodani Dam			20.5	

== See also ==
- Media related to Dams in Ishikawa prefecture at Wikimedia Commons
