= Saigawa Dam =

Saigawa Dam may refer to the following dams in Japan:

- Saigawa Dam (Ishikawa Prefecture)
- Saigawa Dam (Nagano Prefecture)
