= Saigawa =

Saigawa (written: 犀川) may refer to:

- Saigawa, Fukuoka (犀川町, Saigawa-machi), a former town in Miyako District, Fukuoka Prefecture, Japan
- Saigawa Dam (Ishikawa Prefecture) (犀川ダム), a dam in Ishikawa Prefecture, Japan
- Saigawa Dam (Nagano Prefecture) (犀川ダム), a dam in Nagano Prefecture, Japan
