= Dainichigawa Dam =

Dainichigawa Dam may refer to:

- Dainichigawa Dam (Hyōgo)
- Dainichigawa Dam (Ishikawa)
