= Suematsu temple ruins =

- 末松廃寺跡
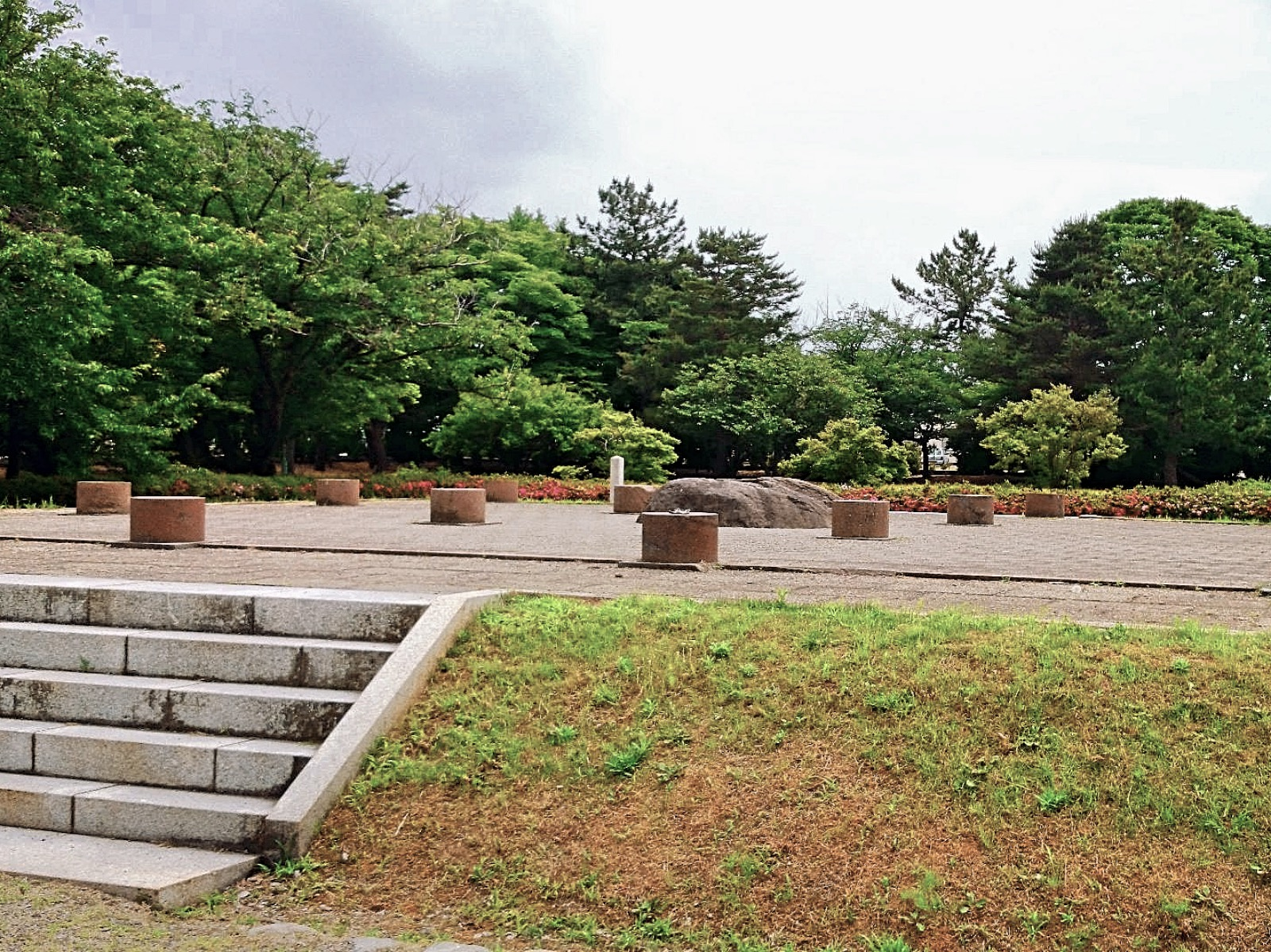
- Suematsu temple ruins in 2015

- Location within Ishikawa Prefecture Location within Japan

Religion
- Affiliation: Buddhist
- Status: ruins

Location
- Location: Nonoichi, Ishikawa
- Country: Japan
- Interactive map of Suematsu temple ruins
- Coordinates: 36°30′29″N 136°35′23″E

Suematsu temple ruins (末松廃寺跡, Suematsu Haiji ato) is an archaeological site with the ruins of a Hakuho period Buddhist temple located in the Suematsu neighbourhood of what is now the city of Nonoichi, Ishikawa, Japan. The temple no longer exists, but the temple grounds were designated as a National Historic Site in 1939, with the area under designation expanded in 1969.

== History ==
Suematsu temple ruins were located in a paddy field near the delta of the Tedori River at an elevation of 38 metres (125 ft). The actual name of the temple is unknown, and it does not appear in historical records, so the temple is named "Suematsu Haiji" after the location. From the Edo period, farmers uncovered a very large foundation stone, called the "Karato stone" and many fragments of roof tiles and pottery in the area, so the presence of a ruined temple was known for a long time. A Karato stone is the stone which supports the core pillar at the centre of a Japanese pagoda, and from the size of the stone unearthed, it is thought that this pagoda must have been very large, perhaps a seven-story tower. The clan who built the temple is thought to be the "Michi-no-kimi", who ruled the northern portion of Kaga Province during the Hakuho period; however, the roof tiles from the temple came from what is now the city of Nomi, Ishikawa, which was under the control of the Takarabe Miyatsuko.

The site was excavated from 1867 to 1968, and the base of the pagoda (measuring 10.8 meters square) was found. The foundation of the Kondō measuring 20 x 18 meters, a portion of the surrounding walls, and the foundations of three smaller buildings were also discovered, indicating that the temple had a layout with the Kondō to the east and the pagoda to the west, similar to that of the temple of Hokki-ji in Ikaruga, Nara. The temple's east-to-west scale was 80 meters; however its extent in the north-to-south direction is unknown, and the foundations of the South Gate remains to be discovered. A large amount of Sue ware and Haji ware pottery roof tiles and some silver Wadōkaichin coins were also discovered. From the style of roof tiles and other artifacts, it is estimated that the temple was abandoned in the late 8th century and was rebuilt once in the late 9th century before falling completely into ruins.

The site is now a public park noted for its cherry blossoms, and is located about 20 minutes by car from Nonoichi Station or Matto Station on the JR West Hokuriku Main Line.

== See also ==
- List of Historic Sites of Japan (Ishikawa)
