= Nonoichi =

Nonoichi 野々市市
- City
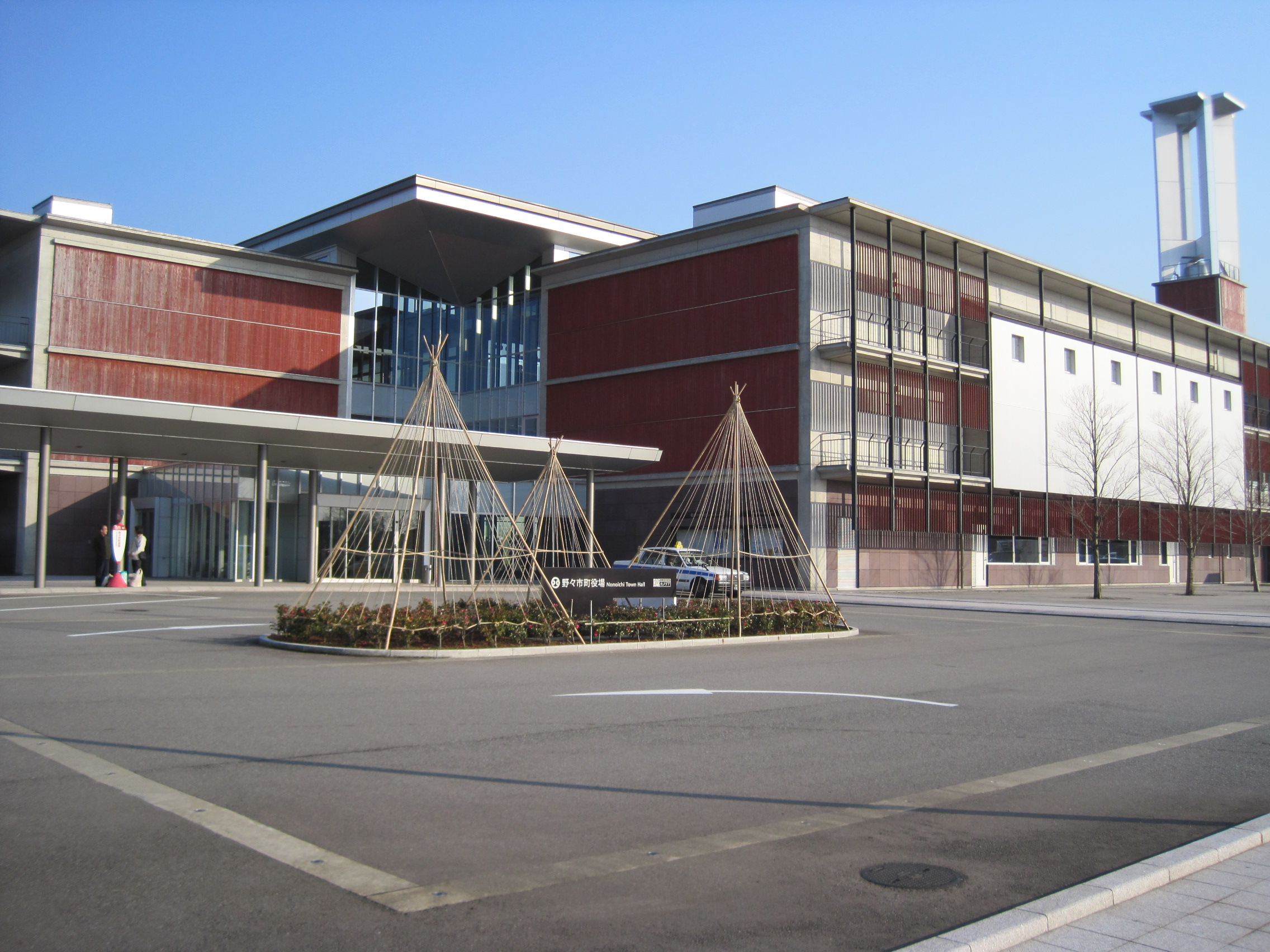
- Nonoichi City Hall

- Flag Seal

- Location of Nonoichi in Ishikawa Prefecture

- Coordinates: 36°31′9.9″N 136°36′35.2″E
- Country: Japan
- Region: Chūbu (Hokuriku)
- Prefecture: Ishikawa Prefecture

Government
  - - Mayor: Tadaaki Awa

Area
  - Total: 13.56 km^{2} (5.24 sq mi)

Population (January 31, 2024)
  - Total: 54,112
  - Density: 3,991/km^{2} (10,340/sq mi)
- Time zone: UTC+9 (Japan Standard Time)
- City symbols
- -Tree: Camellia japonica
- -Flower: Camellia japonica
- Phone number: 076-227-600
- Address: 1-1 Minō, Nonoichi-shi, Ishikawa-ken 921-8510
- Website: Official website

Nonoichi (野々市市, Nonoichi-shi) is a city located in Ishikawa Prefecture, Japan. As of 31 January 2014, the city had an estimated population of 54,112 in 25,381 households, and a population density of 4,000 persons per km^{2}. The total area of the city was 13.56 square kilometres (5.24 sq mi).

== Geography ==
Nonoichi is in central Ishikawa Prefecture, sandwiched between the geographically much larger cities of Kanazawa and Hakusan. The city is located on flatlands on the fertile floodplain of the Tedori River.

=== Neighbouring municipalities ===
- Ishikawa Prefecture
  - Hakusan
  - Kanazawa

== Demographics ==
Per Japanese census data, the population of Nonoichi has grown rapidly over the past 50 years.

Historical population
Year	Pop.	±%
1970	13,598	—
1980	31,817	+134.0%
1990	39,769	+25.0%
2000	45,581	+14.6%
2010	51,885	+13.8%
2020	57,238	+10.3%

== Climate ==
Nonoichi has a humid subtropical climate (Köppen Cfa) characterized by mild summers and cold winters with heavy snowfall. The average annual temperature in Nonoichi is 14.3 °C. The average annual rainfall is 2,542 mm with September as the wettest month. The temperatures are highest on average in August, at around 26.8 °C, and lowest in January, at around 3.0 °C.

== History ==
The area around Nonoichi was part of ancient Kaga Province. The area became part Kaga Domain under the Edo period Tokugawa shogunate, and nonoichi was a post station on the Hokuriku kaidō highway. Following the Meiji restoration, the area was organised into Ishikawa District, Ishikawa. The village of Nonoichi was established with the creation of the modern municipalities system on April 1, 1889. It was raised to town status on July 1, 1924. A referendum to merge with the city of Kanazawa was rejected in 1937. On April 1, 1955, Nonoichi expanded by annexing the neighbouring village of Tomioka. Nonoichi was elevated to city status on November 11, 2011. Ishikawa District was dissolved as a result of this merger.

== Government ==
Nonoichi has a mayor-council form of government with a directly elected mayor and a unicameral city legislature of 15 members.

== Economy ==
Nonoichi is primarily a bedroom community for the city of Kanazawa. Local industries include agriculture and food processing.

== Education ==
=== College and university ===
- Ishikawa Prefectural University
- Kanazawa Institute of Technology
- International College of Technology, Kanazawa

=== Primary and secondary education ===
Nonoichi has five public elementary schools and two middle schools operated by the city government, and one public high school operated by the Ishikawa Prefectural Board of Education. The prefecture also operates one special education school.

== Transportation ==
=== Railway ===
Effective 16 March 2024, JR West no longer operates in Nonoichi as its operations on the Hokuriku Main Line have since been transferred to the IR Ishikawa Railway.

IR Ishikawa Railway

- Nonoichi

Hokuriku Railroad Ishikawa Line

- Oshino - Nonoichi - Nonoichi-Kōdaimae

=== Highway ===
National Route 8
National Route 157
National Route 305

== Sister cities ==
- Gisborne New Zealand, since 1990
- Shenzhen, China, friendship city

== Local attractions ==
- Okyōzuka Site, a Jomon period archaeological site and National Historic Site
- Suematsu temple ruins, a National Historic Site
