= Uchikawa =

Uchikawa (written: 内川) is a Japanese surname. Notable people with the surname include:

- Ai Uchikawa (内川 藍維, born 1972), Japanese voice actress
- Seiichi Uchikawa (内川 聖一, born 1982), Japanese baseball player
- Yoshitaka Uchikawa (内川 義高, born 1931), Japanese long-distance runner

== See also ==
- 11593 Uchikawa, a main-belt asteroid, named for Uchikawa Yoshihisa (b. 1947), a noted amateur astronomer.
- Uchikawa Dam, a dam in Ishikawa Prefecture, Japan
