= Okyōzuka Site =

Archaeological site in Japan

- 御経塚遺跡 (Japanese)
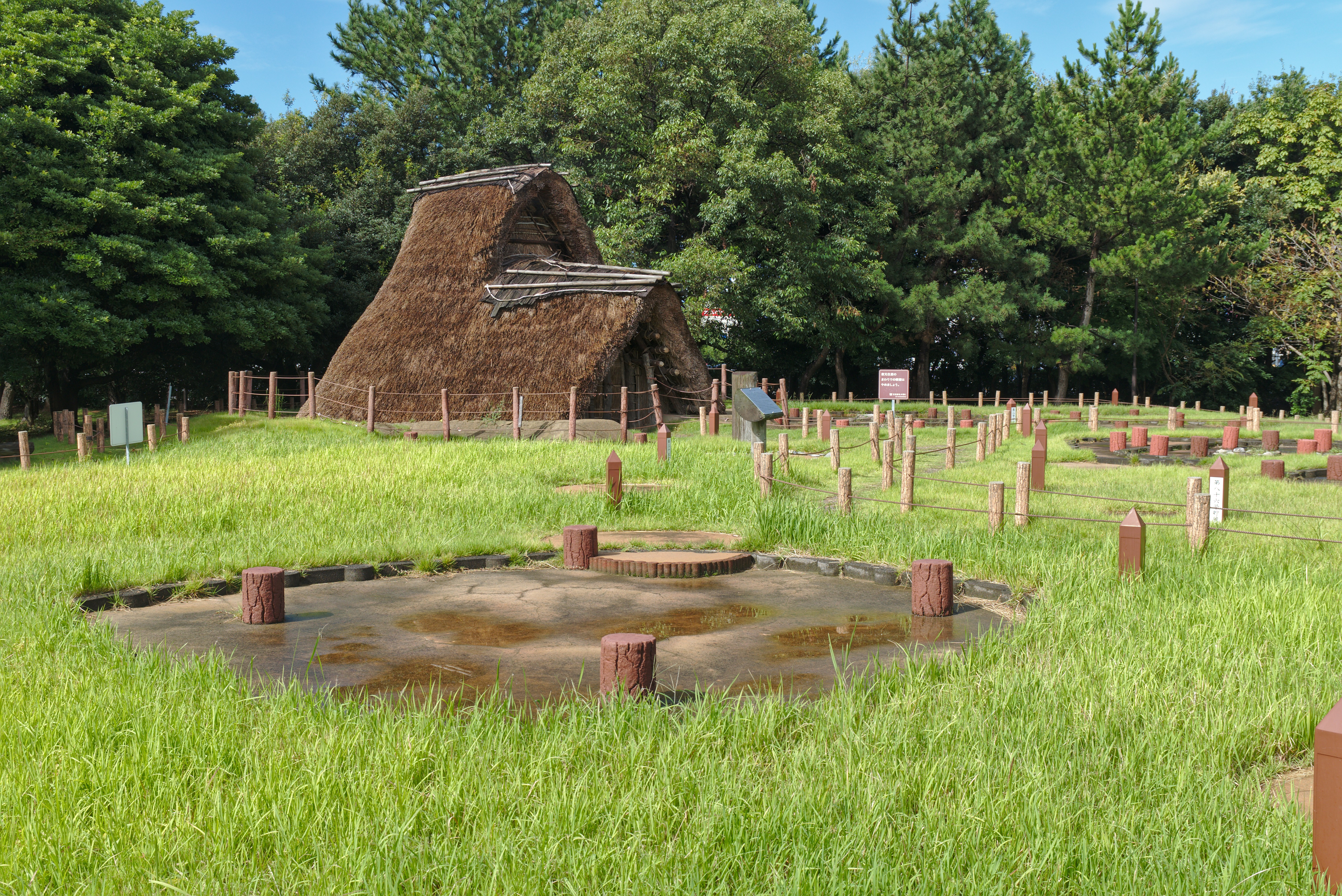
- Restored pit houses at Okyōzuka Site

- Okyōzuka Site Okyōzuka Site (Japan)
- 36°32′46.8″N 136°35′56.9″E
- Type: settlement
- Periods: Jōmon period
- Location: Nonoichi, Ishikawa, Japan
- Region: Hokuriku region

Site notes
- Area: 15,000 m^{2} (160,000 sq ft)
- Public access: Yes (park, museum)

The Okyōzuka Site (御経塚遺跡, Okyōzuka iseki) is an archaeological site with the ruins of a middle to final Jōmon period (around 1700–500 BC) settlement in the Kyōzuka neighborhood of the city of Nonoichi, Ishikawa in the Hokuriku region of Japan. The site was designated a National Historic Site of Japan in 1977.

== Overview ==
The Okyōzuka Site was discovered in 1954 and an excavation survey was conducted from 1955. It was one of the largest settlements in the Hokuriku region from the middle to the late Jōmon period. The ruins straddle the eastern side of Japan National Route 8, and cover an area of about 35,000 square meters. Some 28 pit dwellings have been investigated in more than ten excavations since 1955. The settlement was in a horseshoe-shape, with a diameter of about 200 meters and a plaza in the center.

The site was noted for the huge number of artifacts discovered: 542 Jōmon pottery or earthenware objects, 3642 stone tools or fragments, 23 bone tools, ritual clay figurines and other objects, of which a total of 4219 items were collectively designated as National Important Cultural Properties on June 29, 2010.

The pottery centered on deep and shallow pots with regional characteristics unique to the Hokuriku region while being influenced by both eastern and western Japan, and since chronological continuity is also recognized, it is a type site for "Mitsutsuka-style" Jōmon pottery which has been found throughout the Hokuriku region. Many of the clay figurines excavated at this site are important because they can likewise be periodized according to their form and pattern.

The south side of the ruins is maintained as an archaeological park, and the west half of the site used as a place to enjoy simple sports, with the east side divided into a restored pit dwellings and a learning area centered on vegetation of virgin forest and the Nonoichi City Furusato History Museum (野々市市ふるさと歴史館, Nonoichishi Furusato rikishi-kan) which displays a number of artifacts from the site. It is located about a ten-minute walk from Nonoichi Station on the IR Ishikawa Railway Line.

== Gallery ==
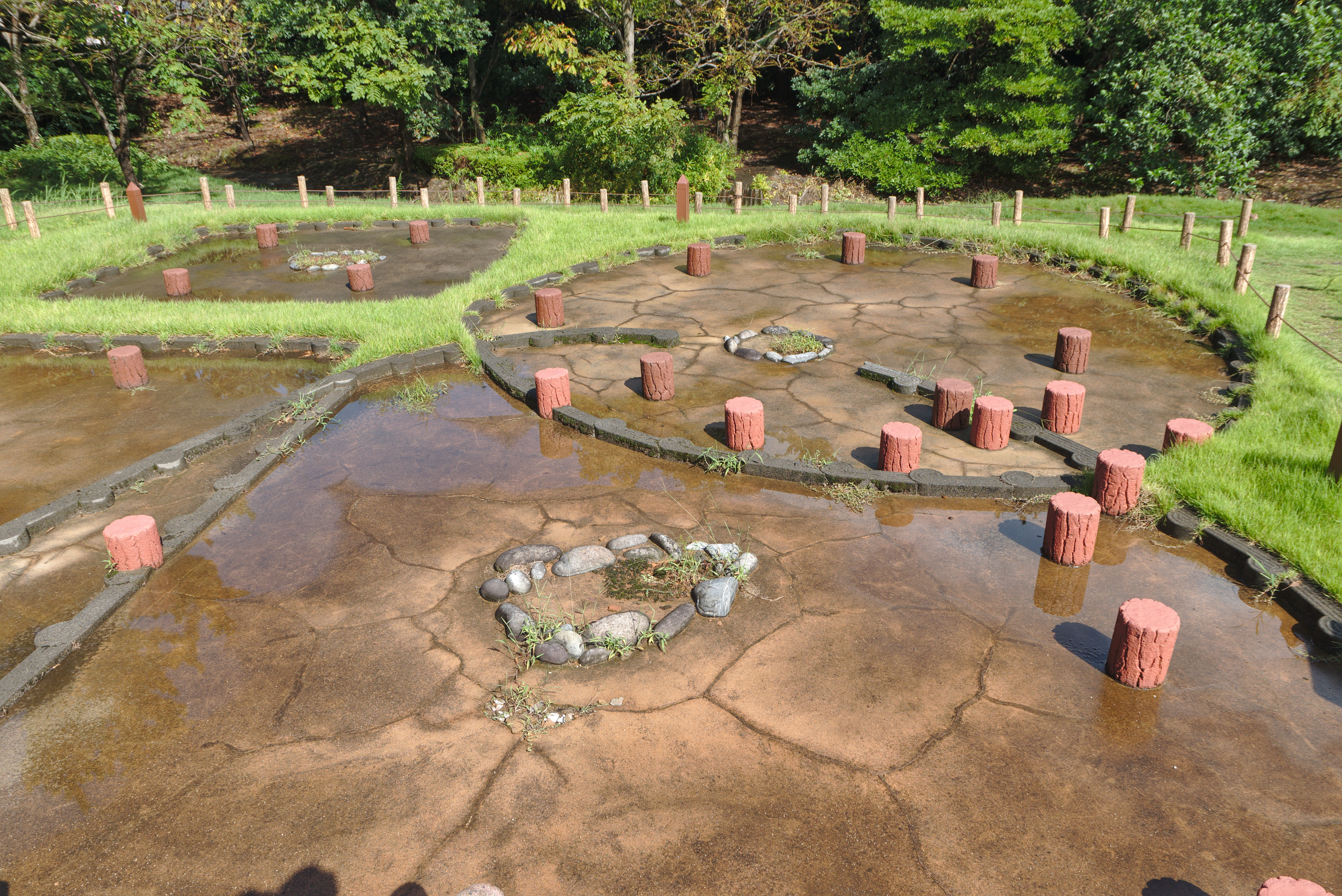
foundations of pit dwellings

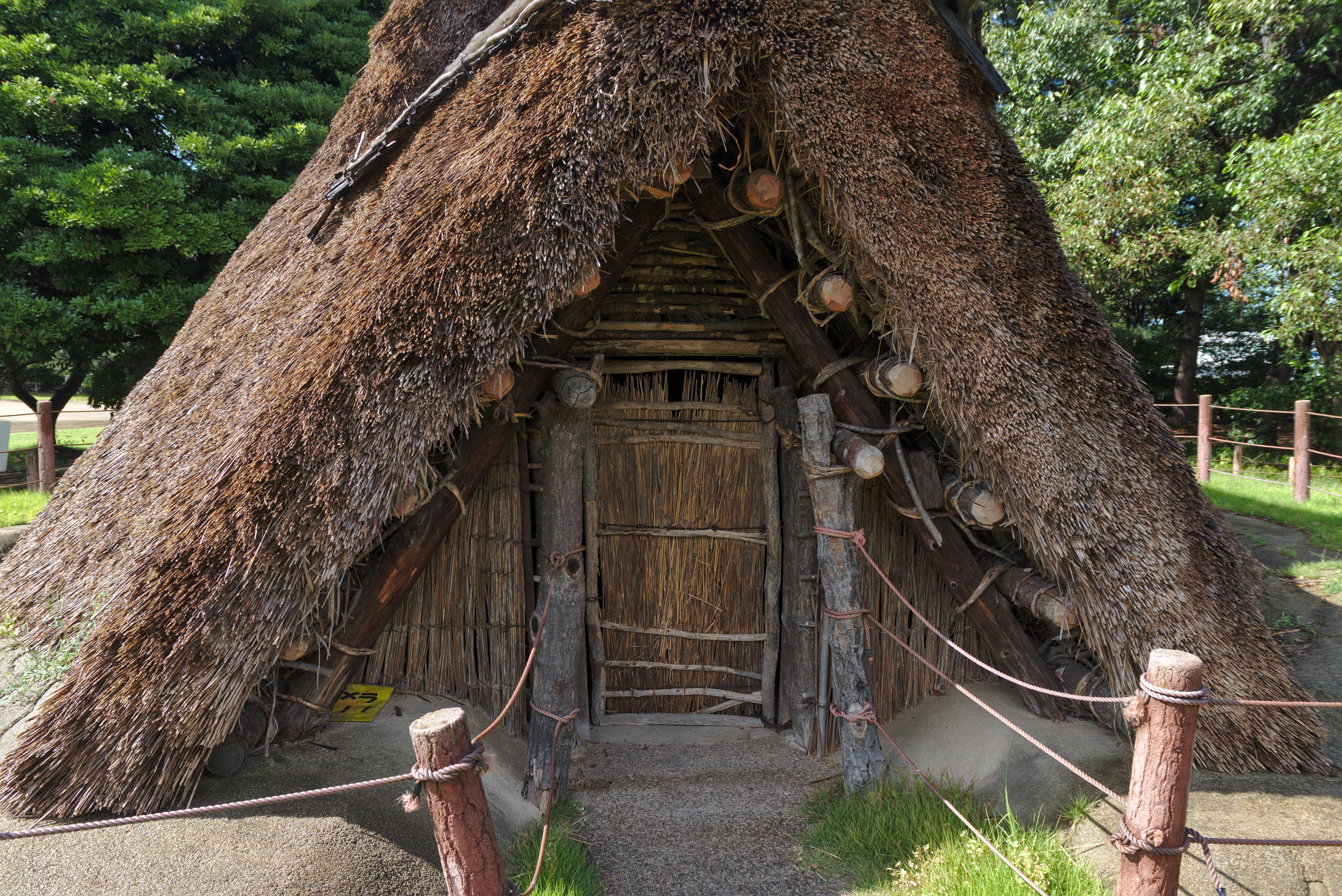
restored pit dwelling

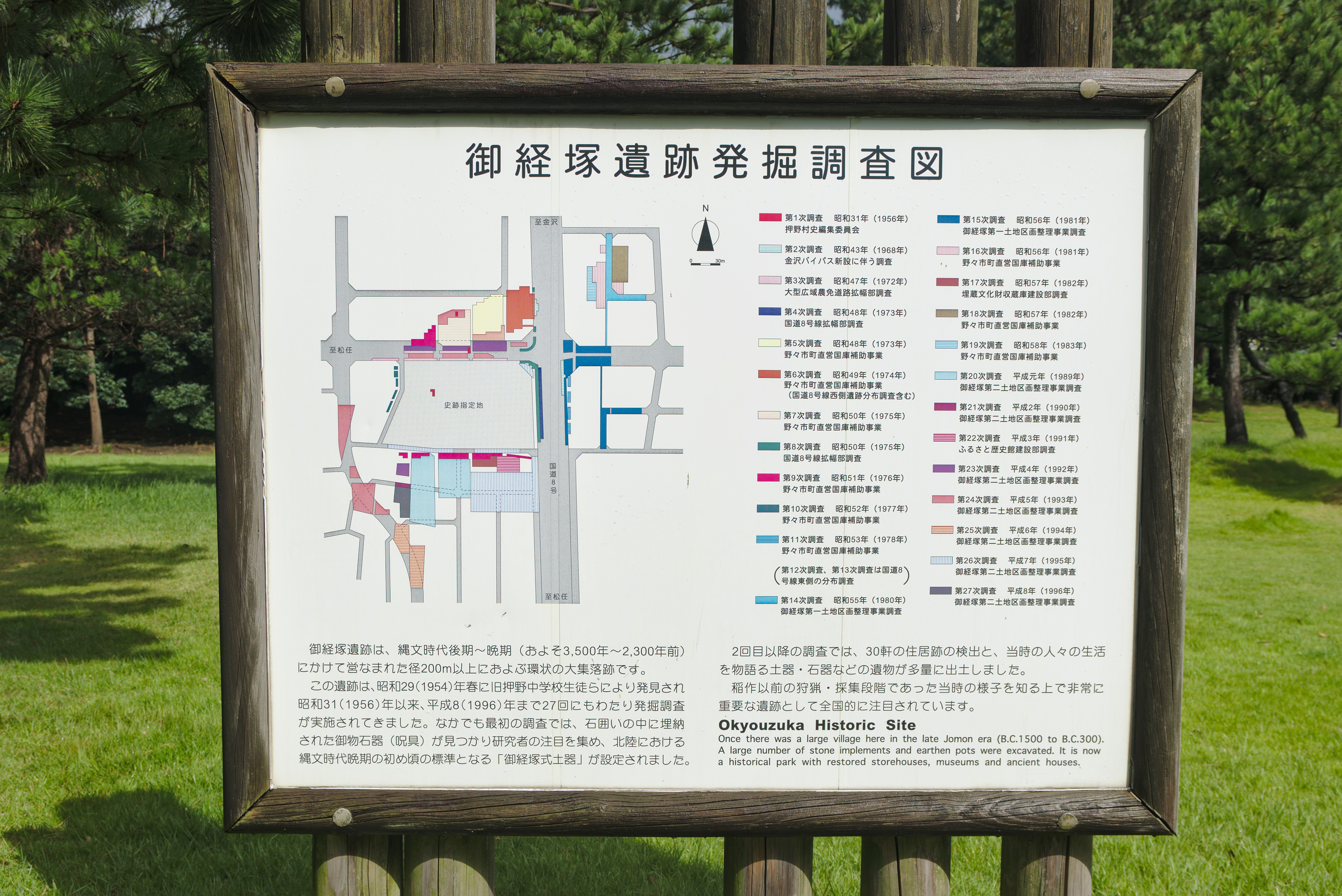
Map of excavations

== See also ==
- List of Historic Sites of Japan (Ishikawa)
