= Kanazawa Institute of Technology =

Institution of higher learning in Nonoichi City, Ishikawa Prefecture, Japan

Coordinates: 36°31′47.7″N 136°37′37.9″E

- 金沢工業大学
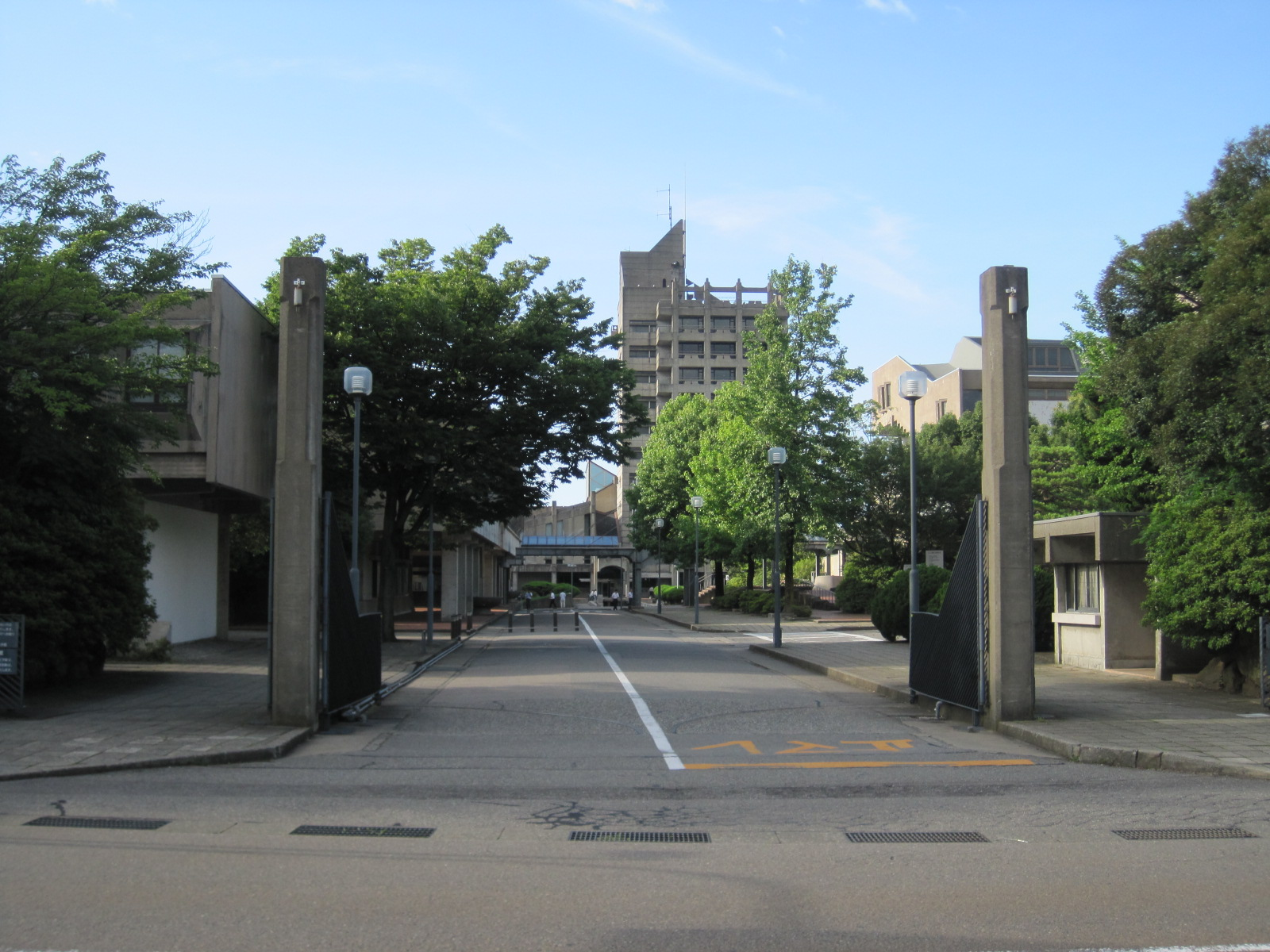
- Type: Private
- Established: 1965
- Location: Nonoichi, Ishikawa, Japan
- Website: www.kanazawa-it.ac.jp

Kanazawa Institute of Technology (金沢工業大学, Kanazawa Kōgyō Daigaku) is an institution of higher learning in Nonoichi City, Ishikawa Prefecture, Japan. It is often called KIT, or Koudai (工大, kōdai) for short.

It is known for its unique educational policy that attaches importance to initiative of students. One of the examples is Yumekobo (夢考房, Yumekōbō), coined from yume (dream), kō (thought, to think) and kōbō (workshop), where students take parts in their projects and research on solar cars, universal design, etc.

== Programs ==
=== Undergraduate programs ===
- College of Engineering (six departments)
- College of Environmental Engineering and Architecture (five departments)
- College of Informatics and Human Communication (four departments)

=== Graduate programs ===
- Mechanical Engineering
- Civil and Environmental Engineering
- Information and Computer Engineering
- Electrical Engineering and Electronics
- System Design Engineering
- Material Design Engineering
- Architecture
- Material Engineering
- System for Intellectual Creation
- Clinical Psychology
