= Ishikawa Prefectural University =

University in Ishikawa Prefecture, Japan

Coordinates: 36°30′23.51″N 136°35′48.57″E

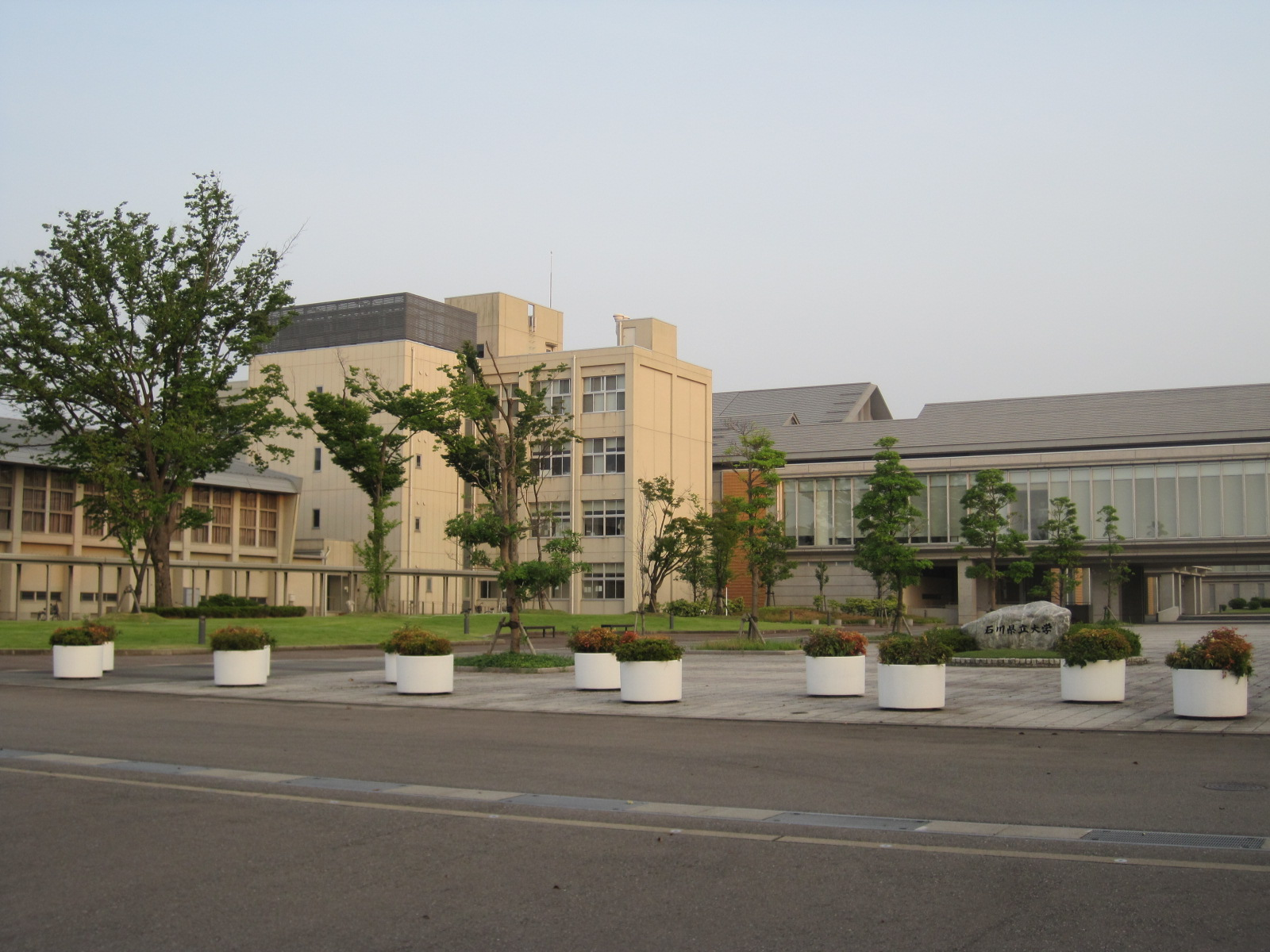
Ishikawa Prefectural University

Ishikawa Prefectural University (石川県立大学, Ishikawa kenritsu daigaku) is a public university in the city of Nonoichi in Ishikawa Prefecture, Japan. The predecessor of the school was founded in 1971 as an agricultural junior college, and it was chartered as a university in 2005.
