= Tedori River =

Tedori River 手取川
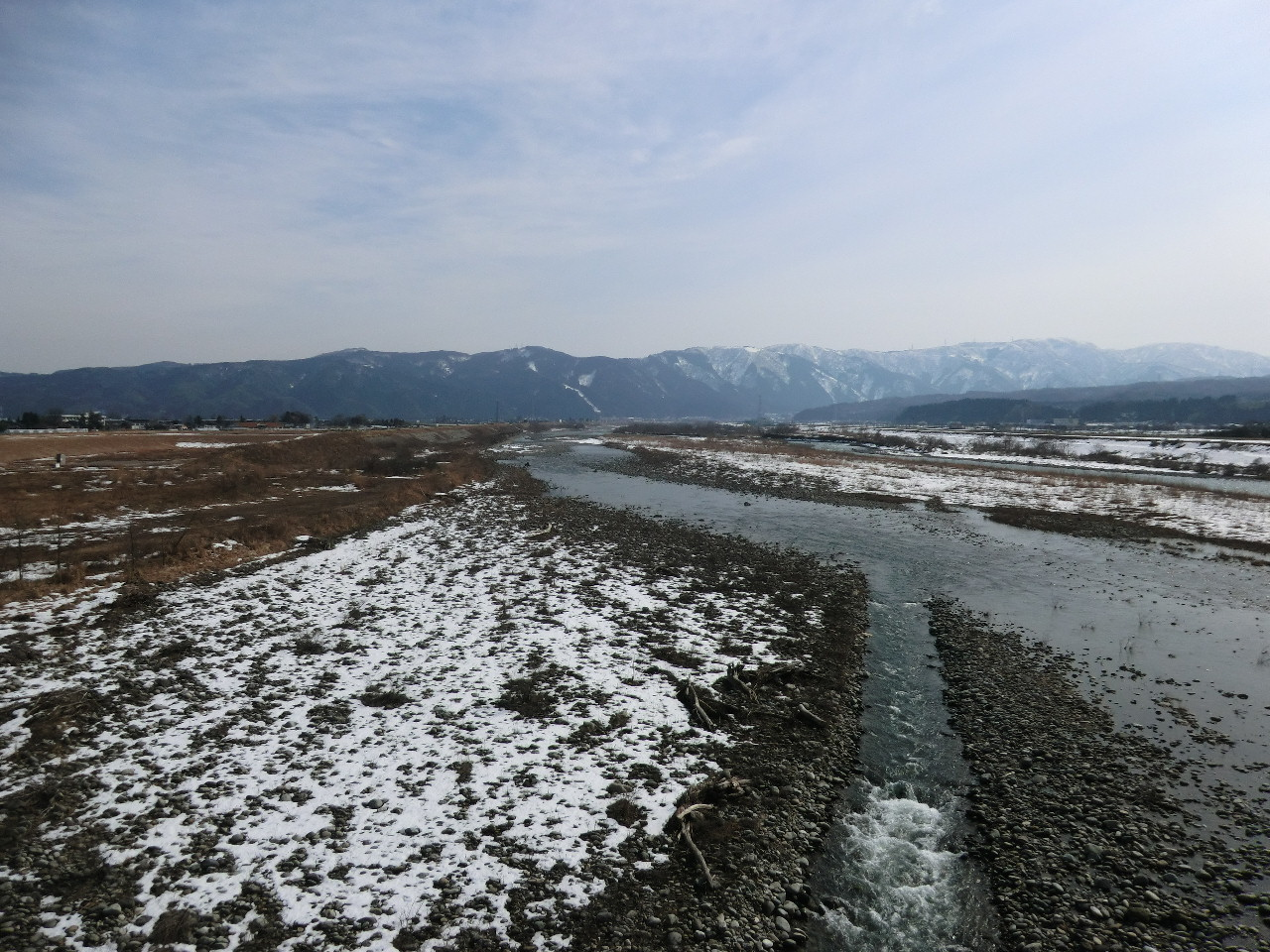
- Tedori River in 2012

- Location within Japan

Location
- Country: Japan
- State: Honshu
- Region: Ishikawa Prefecture

Physical characteristics
- Source: Hakusan
  - elevation: 2,702 m (8,865 ft)
- Mouth: Sea of Japan
  - coordinates: 36°29′19″N 136°28′47″E
  - elevation: 0 m (0 ft)
- Length: 72 km (45 mi)
- Basin size: 809 km^{2} (312 sq mi)

The Tedori River (手取川, Tedorigawa) is a Class A river in southern Ishikawa Prefecture in the Hokuriku region of Japan. The river originates on Hakusan, the highest peak in the Hakusan National Park on the border between Ishikawa and Gifu Prefecture, and flows in a generally northern direction to the Sea of Japan. The river is used extensively for irrigation, and for the generation of hydroelectric power. The Battle of Tedorigawa was fought on the banks of the river in 1577.

== Dams and hydroelectric power generation ==
River	Name	Height	Volume	Type	Generation (KW)
Tedori	Tedorigawa Dam	153.0 m (502.0 ft)	231,000 m^{3} (302,000 yd^{3})	Rockfill	250,000
Tedori	Tedorigawa No.2 Dam	37.5 m (123 ft)	64,000 m^{3} (84,000 yd^{3})	Concrete Gravity	87,000
Ozo	Oguchi Dam	28.4 m (93 ft)	16,000 m^{3} (21,000 yd^{3})	Concrete Gravity	17,600
Ozo	Yoshinodani Dam	20.45 m (67.1 ft)	14,500 m^{3} (19,000 yd^{3})	Concrete Gravity	13,300
Ozo	Chugu Dam	16.64 m (54.6 ft)	2,740 m^{3} (3,580 yd^{3})	Concrete Gravity	3,000
Dainichi	Dainichigawa Dam	59.9 m (197 ft)	309,000 m^{3} (404,000 yd^{3})	Concrete Gravity	9,000
Tedori	Tedorigawa No.3 Dam	50.0 m (164.0 ft)	4,247 m^{3} (5,555 yd^{3})	Concrete Gravity	30,000
