= Mikohara Dam =

Dam in Ishikawa Prefecture, Japan

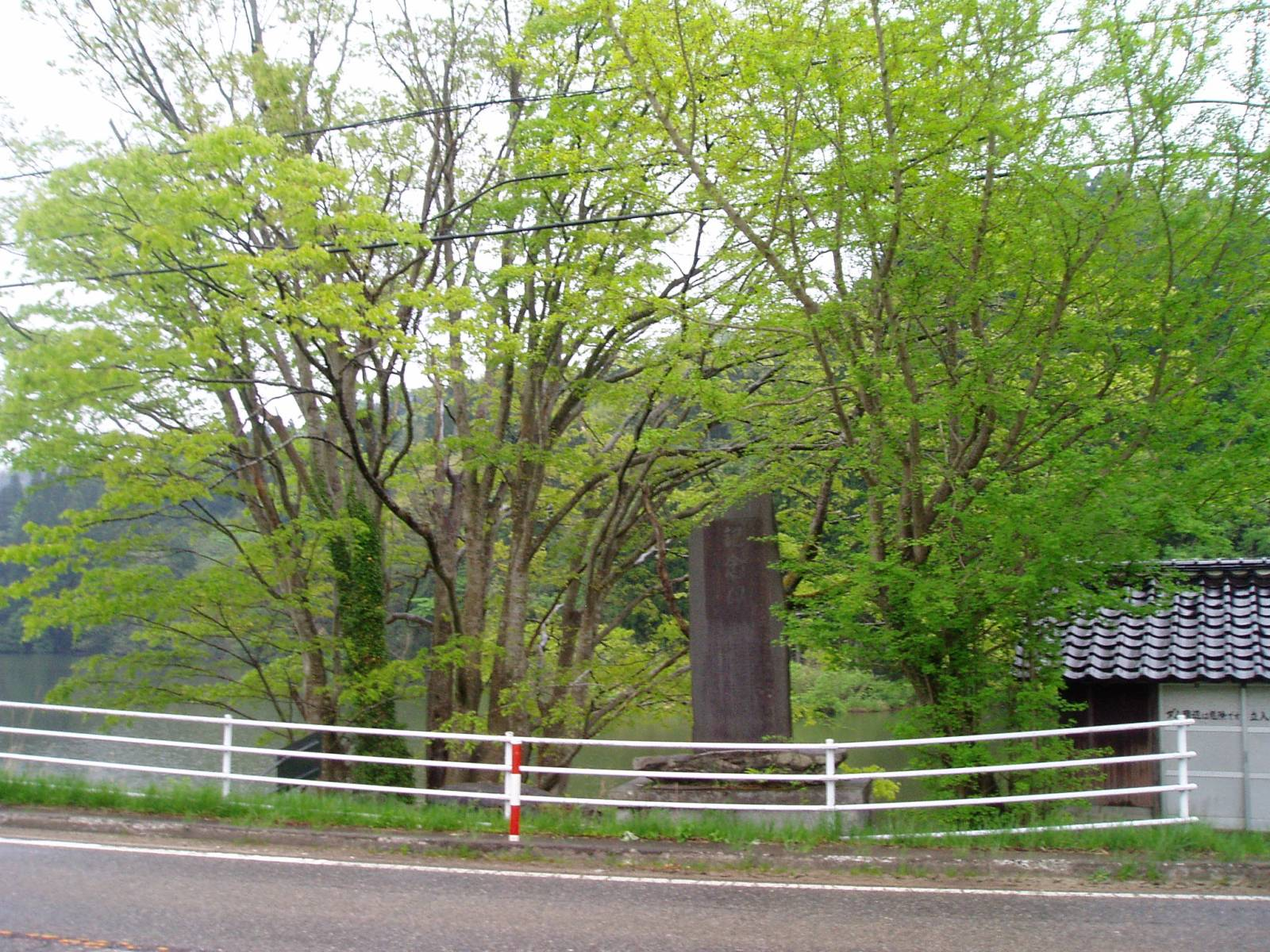

- Location within Japan
- Official name: 神子原ダム
- Location: Ishikawa Prefecture, Japan
- Coordinates: 36°52′57″N 136°51′07″E
- Opening date: 1942

Dam and spillways
- Height: 23.7 m (78 ft)
- Length: 63 m (207 ft)

Reservoir
- Total capacity: 478 thousand cubic meters
- Surface area: 3 hectares

Mikohara Dam (Japanese: 神子原ダム) is an earthfill dam located in Ishikawa Prefecture in Japan. The dam is used for irrigation. The dam impounds about 3 ha of land when full and can store 478 thousand cubic meters of water. The construction of the dam was completed in 1942.

== See also ==
- List of dams in Japan
