= Miyata Bosai Dam =

Dam in Ishikawa Prefecture, Japan

- Location within Japan
- Official name: 宮田防災ダム
- Location: Ishikawa Prefecture, Japan
- Coordinates: 37°13′26″N 137°2′39″E
- Construction began: 1972
- Opening date: 1979

Dam and spillways
- Height: 22.1 m (73 ft)
- Length: 101.5 m (333 ft)

Reservoir
- Total capacity: 310 thousand cubic meters
- Catchment area: 3.2 sq. km
- Surface area: 5 hectares

Miyata Bosai Dam (Japanese: 宮田防災ダム) is an earthfill dam located in Ishikawa Prefecture in Japan. The dam is used for flood control. The catchment area of the dam is 3.2 km^{2}. The dam impounds about 5 ha of land when full and can store 310 thousand cubic meters of water. The construction of the dam was started on 1972 and completed in 1979.

== See also ==
- List of dams in Japan
