= Kitakawachi Dam =

Coordinates: 37°22′39″N 137°02′33″E

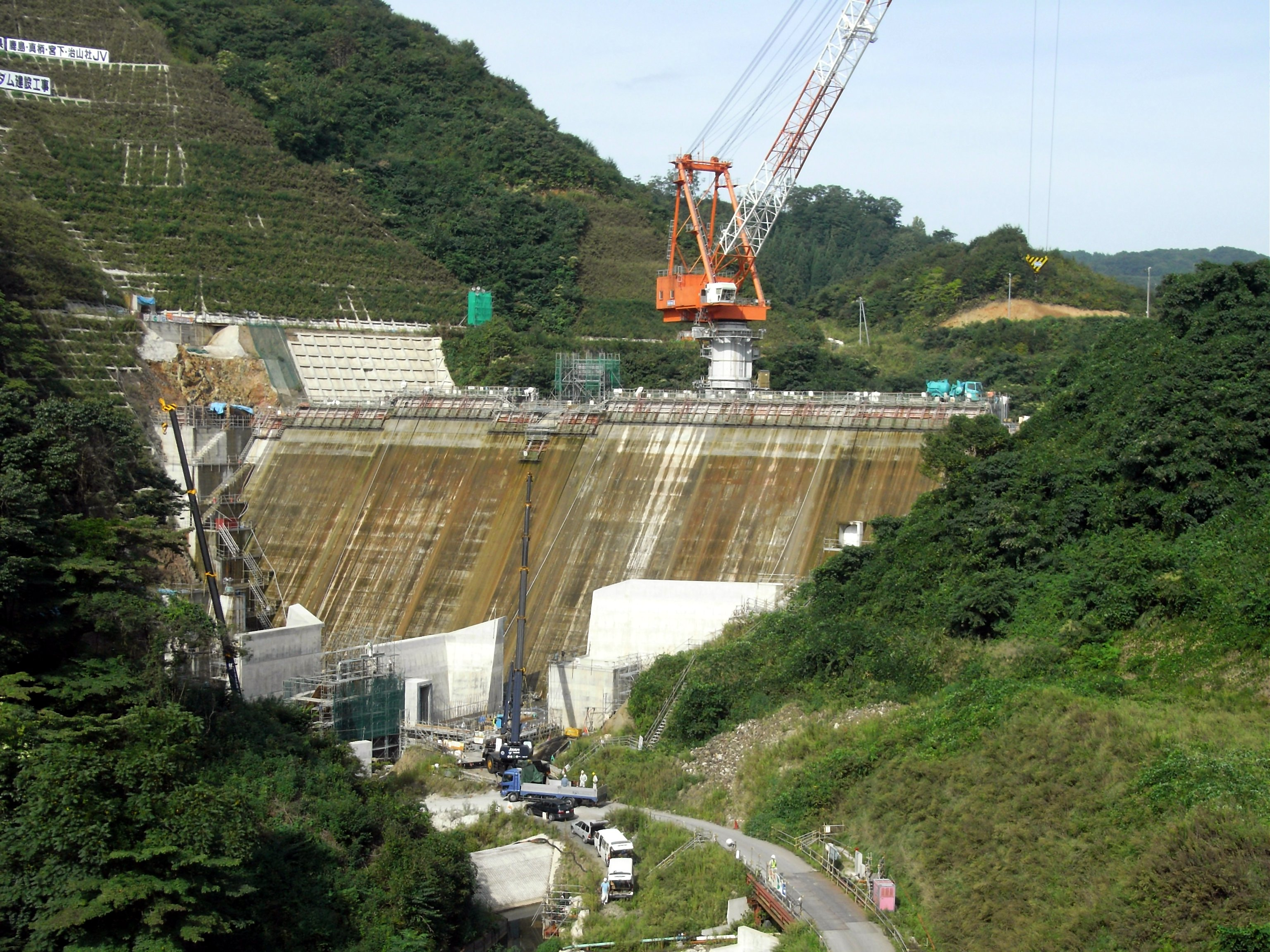
- Interactive map of Kitakawachi Dam
- Location: Ishikawa Prefecture, Japan

Kitakawachi Dam is a dam in the Ishikawa Prefecture of Japan, completed in 2010.
