= Tatsumi Dam =

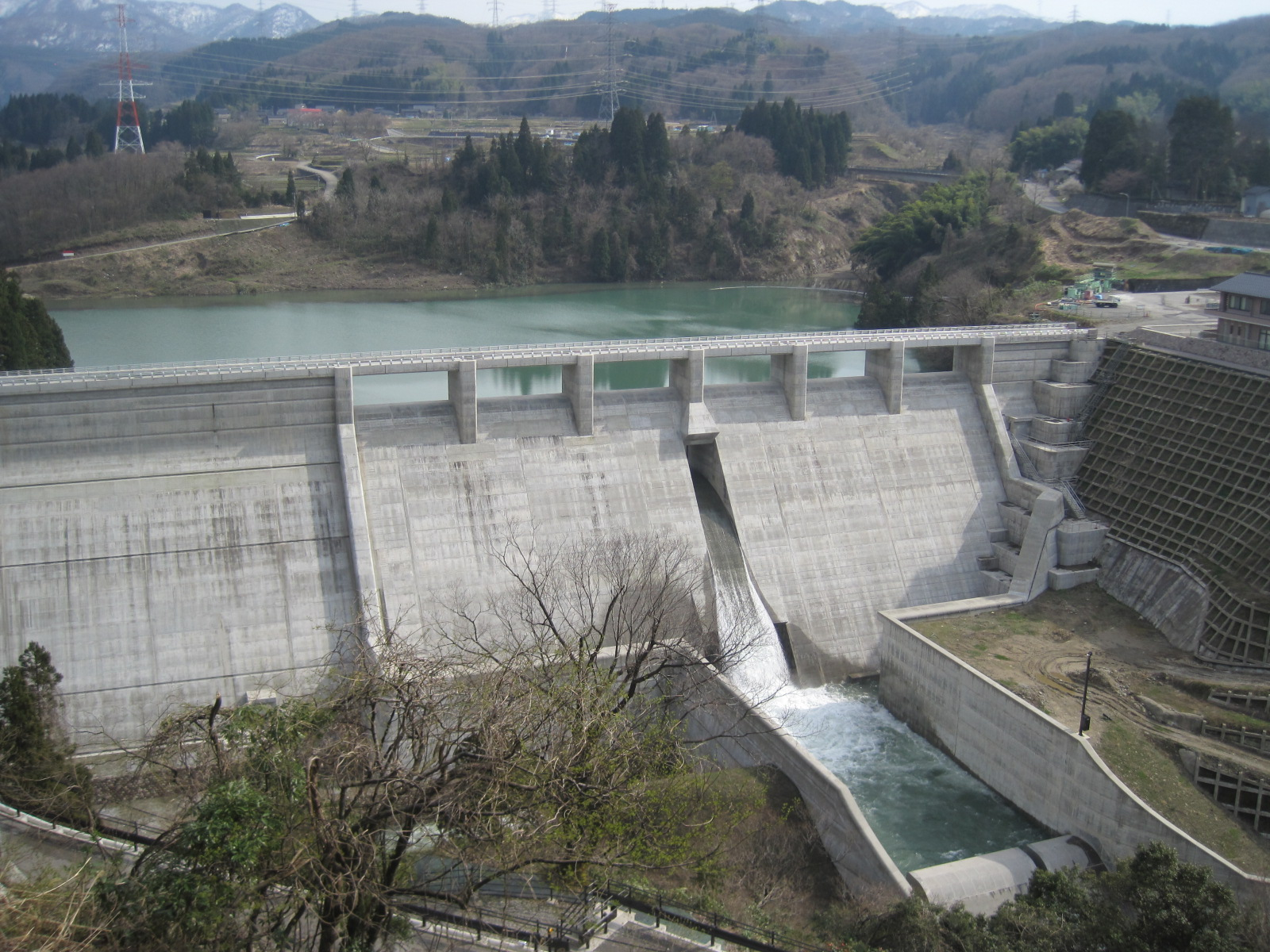
- Interactive map of Tatsumi Dam
- Location: Ishikawa Prefecture, Japan

Tatsumi Dam is a dam in the Ishikawa Prefecture of Japan, completed in 2012.

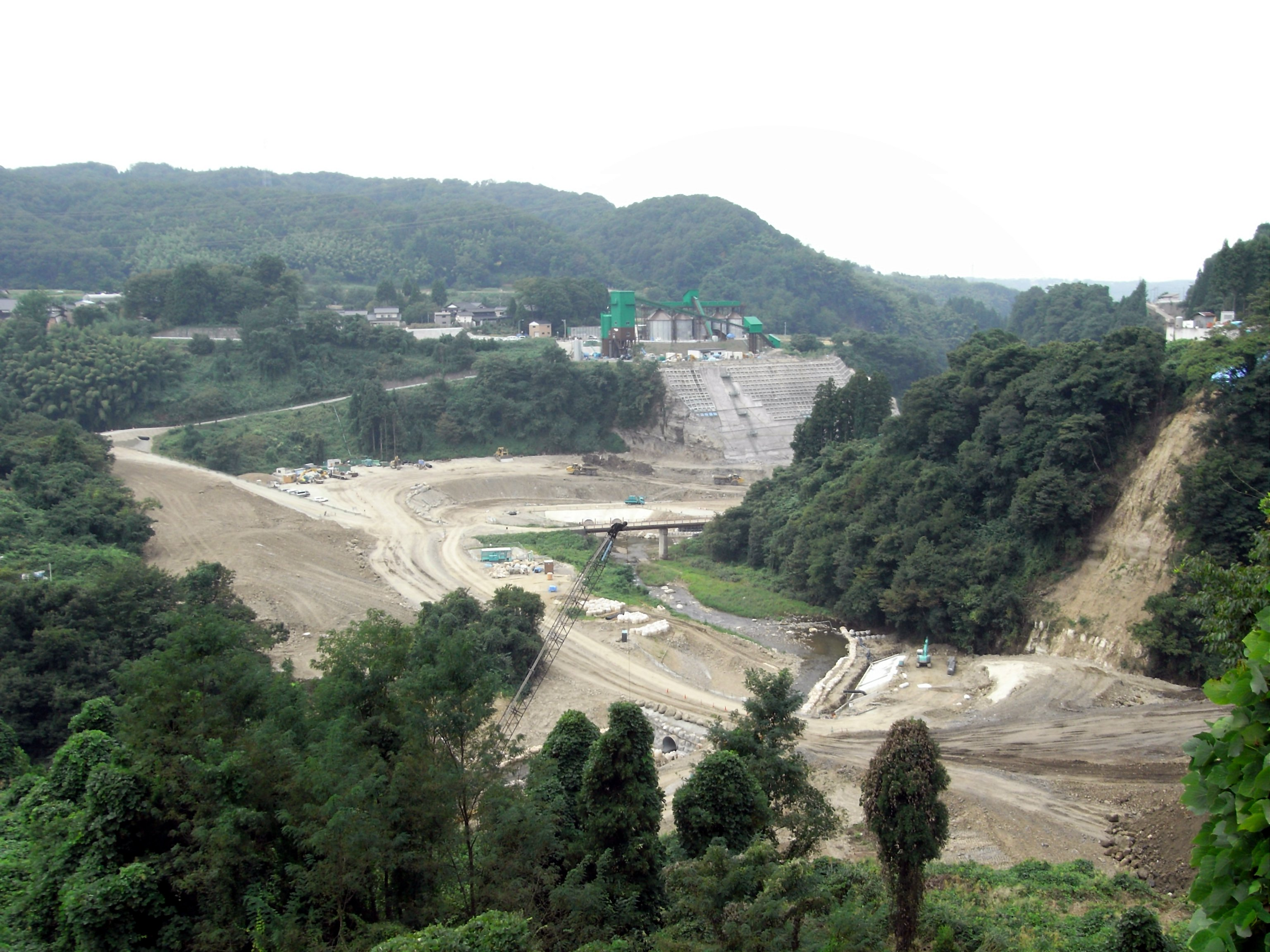
The dam under construction in 2008.
