= Wagatani Dam =

Dam in Ishikawa Prefecture, Japan

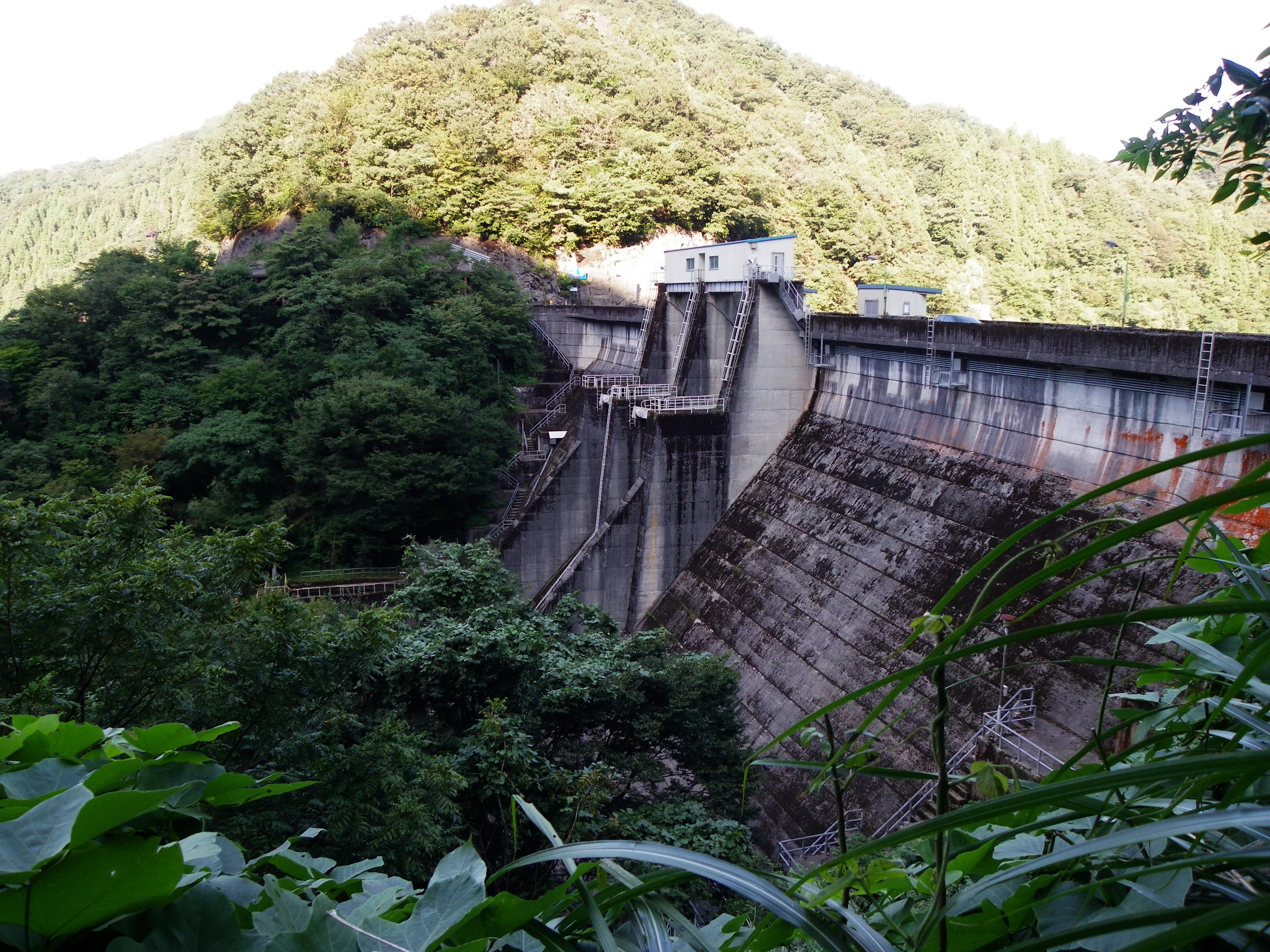

- Location within Japan
- Official name: 我谷ダム
- Location: Ishikawa Prefecture, Japan
- Coordinates: 36°12′39″N 136°20′58″E
- Construction began: 1958
- Opening date: 1964

Dam and spillways
- Height: 56.5 m (185 ft)
- Length: 126 m (413 ft)

Reservoir
- Total capacity: 10,100,000 m^{3} (360,000,000 cu ft)
- Catchment area: 86.1 km^{2} (33.2 sq mi)
- Surface area: 60 hectares (150 acres)

Wagatani Dam (Japanese: 我谷ダム) is a gravity dam located in Ishikawa Prefecture in Japan. The dam is used for flood control and power production. The catchment area of the dam is 86.1 km^{2}. The dam impounds about 60 ha of land when full and can store 10100 thousand cubic meters of water. The construction of the dam was started on 1958 and completed in 1964.

== See also ==
- List of dams in Japan
