= Tedorigawa No.2 Dam =

Dam in Ishikawa Prefecture, Japan

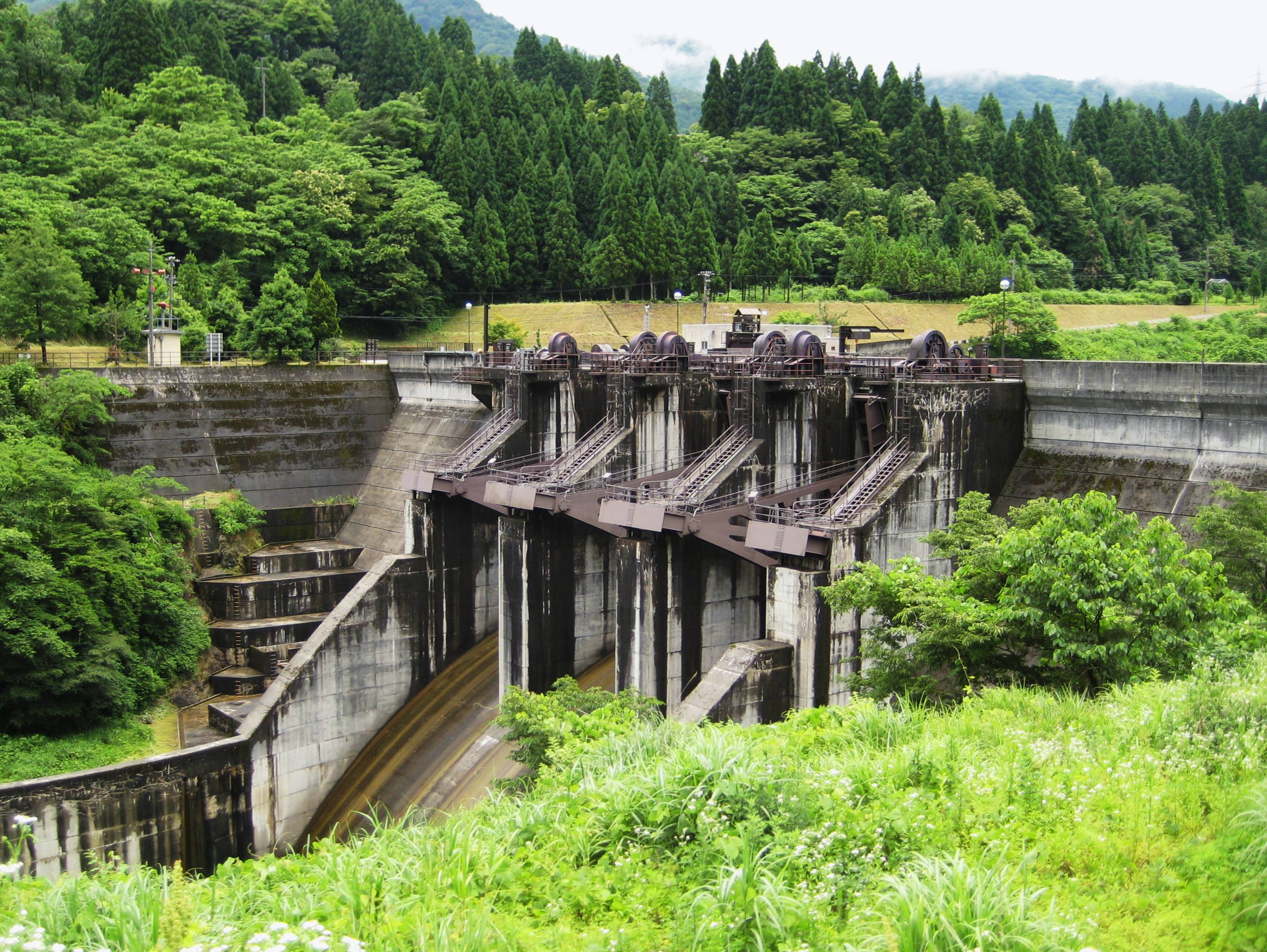

- Location within Japan
- Official name: 手取川第２ダム
- Location: Ishikawa Prefecture, Japan
- Coordinates: 36°17′34″N 136°38′27″E
- Construction began: 1972; 54 years ago
- Opening date: 1979; 47 years ago

Dam and spillways
- Height: 37.5 m (123 ft)
- Length: 210 m (690 ft)

Reservoir
- Total capacity: 1,700,000 m^{3} (60,000,000 cu ft)
- Catchment area: 460.4 km^{2} (177.8 sq mi)
- Surface area: 18 ha (44 acres)

Tedorigawa No.2 Dam (Japanese: 手取川第２ダム) is a gravity dam located in Ishikawa Prefecture in Japan. The dam is used for power production. The catchment area of the dam is 460.4 km^{2} (177.8 sq mi). The dam impounds about 18 ha (44 acres) of land when full and can store 1700 thousand cubic meters of water. The construction of the dam was started on 1972 and completed in 1979.

== See also ==
- List of dams in Japan
