= Tedorigawa Dam =

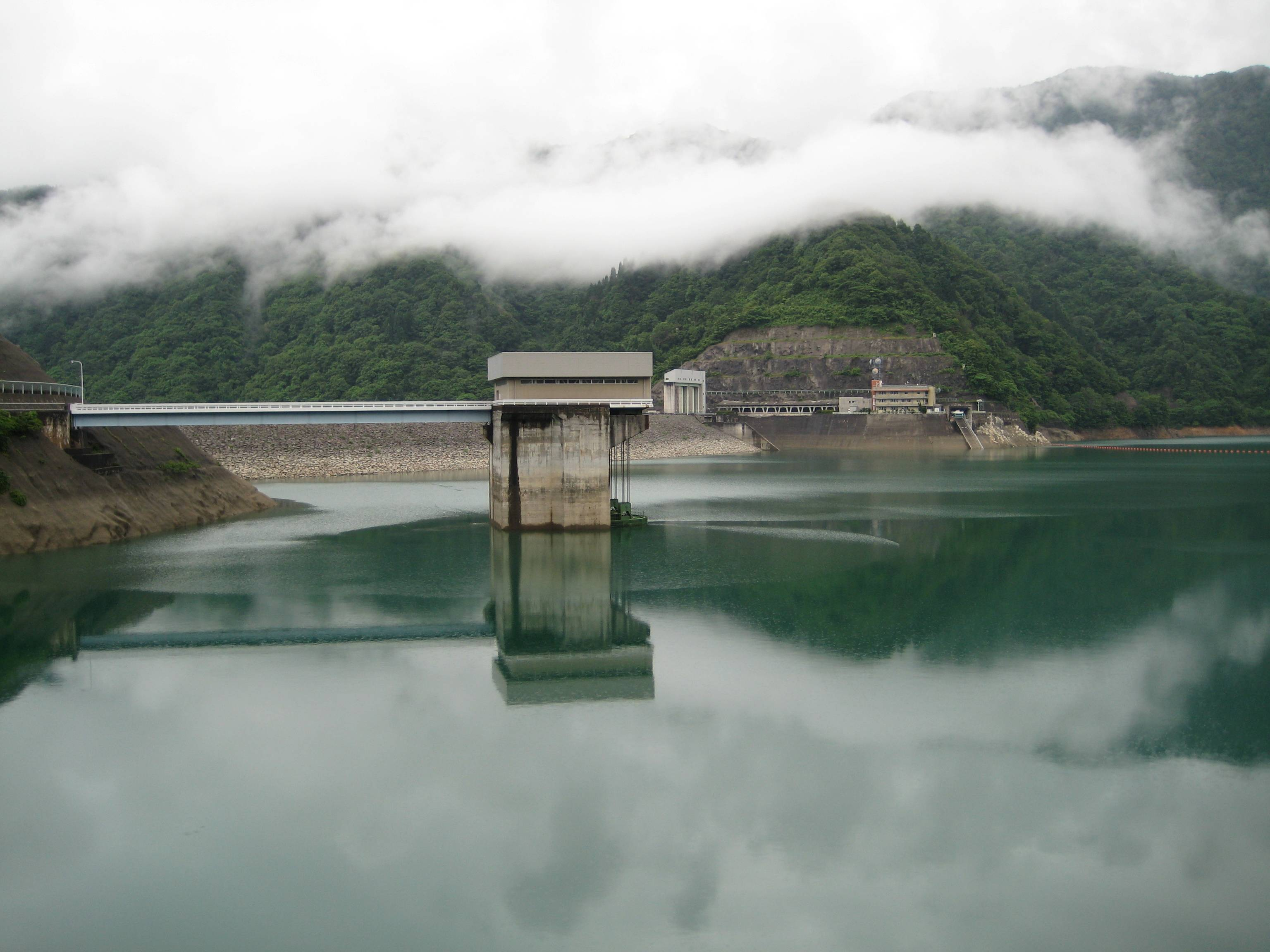
- Interactive map of Tedorigawa Dam
- Location: Ishikawa Prefecture, Japan
- Coordinates: 36°15′53″N 136°38′41″E

Tedorigawa Dam (手取川ダム) is a dam on the Tedori River in Ishikawa Prefecture, Japan, completed in 1979.

Due to the construction of the dam, 330 households and 322 households in Oguchi village and Shiramine village were submerged in water, and a large-scale opposition movement had risen from the beginning, making compensation negotiations difficult.
