= Shiokawa Bosai Dam =

Dam in Ishikawa Prefecture, Japan

- Location within Japan
- Official name: 子浦川防災ダム
- Location: Ishikawa Prefecture, Japan
- Coordinates: 36°50′47″N 136°50′05″E
- Opening date: 1956

Dam and spillways
- Height: 24 m (79 ft)
- Length: 146.5 m (481 ft)

Reservoir
- Total capacity: 669,000 m^{3} (23,600,000 cu ft)
- Catchment area: 39 km^{2} (15 sq mi)
- Surface area: 8 hectares (20 acres)

Shiokawa Bosai Dam (Japanese: 子浦川防災ダム) is an earthfill dam located in Ishikawa Prefecture in Japan. The dam is used for flood control and irrigation. The catchment area of the dam is 39 km^{2}. The dam impounds about 8 ha of land when full and can store 669 thousand cubic meters of water. The construction of the dam was completed in 1956.

== See also ==
- List of dams in Japan
