= Ohzsemachi Dam =

Dam in Ishikawa Prefecture, Japan

- Location within Japan
- Official name: 大世町ダム
- Location: Ishikawa Prefecture, Japan
- Coordinates: 37°4′42″N 136°48′12″E
- Construction began: 1942
- Opening date: 1954

Dam and spillways
- Height: 18 m (59 ft)
- Length: 94 m (308 ft)

Reservoir
- Total capacity: 861,000 m^{3} (30,400,000 cu ft)
- Catchment area: 0.9 km^{2} (0.35 sq mi)
- Surface area: 14 hectares (35 acres)

Ohzsemachi Dam (Japanese: 大世町ダム) is an earthfill dam located in Ishikawa Prefecture in Japan. The dam is used for irrigation. The catchment area of the dam is 0.9 km^{2}. The dam impounds about 14 ha of land when full and can store 861 thousand cubic meters of water. The construction of the dam was started in 1942 and completed in 1954.

== See also ==
- List of dams in Japan
