= Jike Dam =

Dam in Ishikawa Prefecture, Japan

- Location within Japan
- Interactive map of Jike Dam
- Official name: 寺家ダム
- Location: Ishikawa Prefecture, Japan
- Coordinates: 37°29′54″N 137°19′25″E
- Construction began: 1977
- Opening date: 1991

Dam and spillways
- Height: 35.4 m (116 ft)
- Length: 221 m (725 ft)

Reservoir
- Total capacity: 620 thousand cubic meters
- Catchment area: 1.1 sq. km
- Surface area: 8 hectares

Jike Dam (Japanese: 寺家ダム) is a rockfill dam located in Ishikawa Prefecture in Japan. The dam is used for irrigation. The catchment area of the dam is 1.1 km^{2}. The dam impounds about 8 ha of land when full and can store 620 thousand cubic meters of water. The construction of the dam was started on 1977 and completed in 1991.

== See also ==
- List of dams in Japan
