= Oya Dam =

Dam in Ishikawa Prefecture, Japan

- Location within Japan
- Official name: 小屋ダム
- Location: Ishikawa Prefecture, Japan
- Coordinates: 37°23′30″N 137°10′41″E
- Construction began: 1973
- Opening date: 1992

Dam and spillways
- Height: 56.5 m (185 ft)
- Length: 240 m (790 ft)

Reservoir
- Total capacity: 3,050,000 m^{3} (108,000,000 cu ft)
- Catchment area: 12.8 km^{2} (4.9 sq mi)
- Surface area: 24 hectares (59 acres)

Oya Dam (Japanese: 小屋ダム) is a rockfill dam located in Ishikawa Prefecture in Japan. The dam is used for flood control and water supply. The catchment area of the dam is 12.8 km^{2}. The dam impounds about 24 ha of land when full and can store 3050 thousand cubic meters of water. The construction of the dam was started on 1973 and completed in 1992.

== See also ==
- List of dams in Japan
