= Shingu Dam =

Dam in Ishikawa Prefecture, Japan

- Location within Japan
- Official name: 新宮ダム
- Location: Ishikawa Prefecture, Japan
- Coordinates: 36°50′12″N 136°49′11″E
- Opening date: 1955

Dam and spillways
- Height: 25.4 m (83 ft)
- Length: 82.2 m (270 ft)

Reservoir
- Total capacity: 424,000 m^{3} (15,000,000 cu ft)
- Catchment area: 6 km^{2} (2.3 sq mi)
- Surface area: 6 hectares (15 acres)

Shingu Dam (Japanese: 新宮ダム) is an earthfill dam located in Ishikawa Prefecture in Japan. The dam is used for irrigation. The catchment area of the dam is 6 km^{2}. The dam impounds about 6 ha of land when full and can store 424 thousand cubic meters of water. The construction of the dam was completed in 1955.

== See also ==
- List of dams in Japan
