= Fukumitsu Dam =

Dam in Ishikawa Prefecture, Japan

- Location within Japan
- Interactive map of Fukumitsu Dam
- Official name: 福光ダム
- Location: Ishikawa Prefecture, Japan
- Coordinates: 37°21′23″N 137°11′11″E
- Construction began: 1977
- Opening date: 1986

Dam and spillways
- Height: 36.5 m (120 ft)
- Length: 143.6 m (471 ft)

Reservoir
- Total capacity: 419 thousand cubic meters
- Catchment area: 0.9 sq. km
- Surface area: 5 hectares

Fukumitsu Dam (Japanese: 福光ダム) is a rockfill dam located in Ishikawa Prefecture in Japan. The dam is used for irrigation. The catchment area of the dam is 0.9 km^{2}. The dam impounds about 5 ha of land when full and can store 419 thousand cubic meters of water. The construction of the dam was started on 1977 and completed in 1986.

== See also ==
- List of dams in Japan
