= Kutani Dam =

Coordinates: 36°12′23″N 136°22′40″E

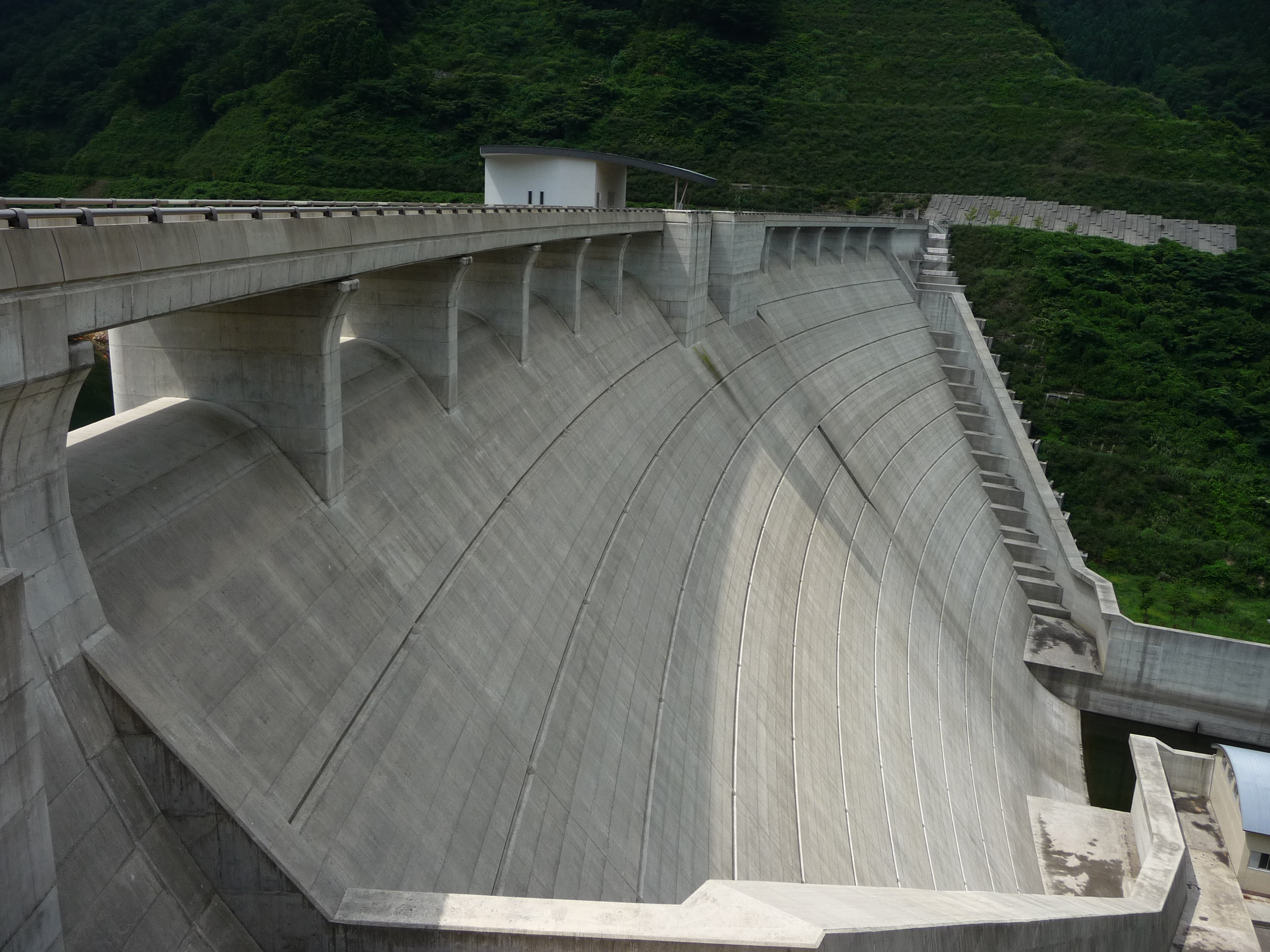
- Interactive map of Kutani Dam
- Location: Ishikawa Prefecture, Japan
- Opening date: 2005

Dam and spillways
- Height: 76 m (249 ft)

Kutani Dam is a dam in the Ishikawa Prefecture of Japan.
