= Morohashi Dam =

Dam in Ishikawa Prefecture, Japan

- Location within Japan
- Official name: 諸橋ダム
- Location: Ishikawa Prefecture, Japan
- Coordinates: 37°14′03″N 137°2′58″E
- Construction began: 1977
- Opening date: 1986

Dam and spillways
- Height: 35.2 m (115 ft)
- Length: 120 m (390 ft)

Reservoir
- Total capacity: 1725 thousand cubic meters
- Catchment area: 2.6 sq. km
- Surface area: 15 hectares

Morohashi Dam (Japanese: 諸橋ダム) is a rockfill dam located in Ishikawa Prefecture in Japan. The dam is used for flood control and irrigation. The catchment area of the dam is 2.6 km^{2}. The dam impounds about 15 ha of land when full and can store 1725 thousand cubic meters of water. The construction of the dam was started on 1977 and completed in 1986.

== See also ==
- List of dams in Japan
