= Shinuchikawa Dam =

Dam in Ishikawa Prefecture, Japan

- Location within Japan
- Official name: 新内川ダム
- Location: Ishikawa Prefecture, Japan
- Coordinates: 36°29′21″N 136°40′52″E
- Construction began: 1981
- Opening date: 1984

Dam and spillways
- Height: 18.9 m (62 ft)
- Length: 62.9 m (206 ft)

Reservoir
- Total capacity: 61,000 m^{3} (2,200,000 cu ft)
- Catchment area: 37.3 km^{2} (14.4 sq mi)
- Surface area: 2 hectares (4.9 acres)

Shinuchikawa Dam (Japanese: 新内川ダム) is a gravity dam located in Ishikawa Prefecture in Japan. The dam is used for power production. The catchment area of the dam is 37.3 km^{2}. The dam impounds about 2 ha of land when full and can store 61 thousand cubic meters of water. The construction of the dam was started on 1981 and completed in 1984.

== See also ==
- List of dams in Japan
