= Wakayama Dam =

Dam in Ishikawa Prefecture, Japan

- Location within Japan
- Official name: 若山ダム
- Location: Ishikawa Prefecture, Japan
- Coordinates: 37°26′43″N 137°8′50″E
- Opening date: 1963

Dam and spillways
- Height: 25.4 m (83 ft)
- Length: 87.2 m (286 ft)

Reservoir
- Total capacity: 486,000 m^{3} (17,200,000 cu ft)
- Catchment area: 4.2 km^{2} (1.6 sq mi)
- Surface area: 6 hectares (15 acres)

Wakayama Dam (Japanese: 若山ダム) is an earthfill dam located in Ishikawa Prefecture in Japan. The dam is used for irrigation. The catchment area of the dam is 4.2 km^{2}. The dam impounds about 6 ha of land when full and can store 486 thousand cubic meters of water. The construction of the dam was completed in 1963.

== See also ==
- List of dams in Japan
