= Ohtsubogawa Dam =

Dam in Ishikawa Prefecture, Japan

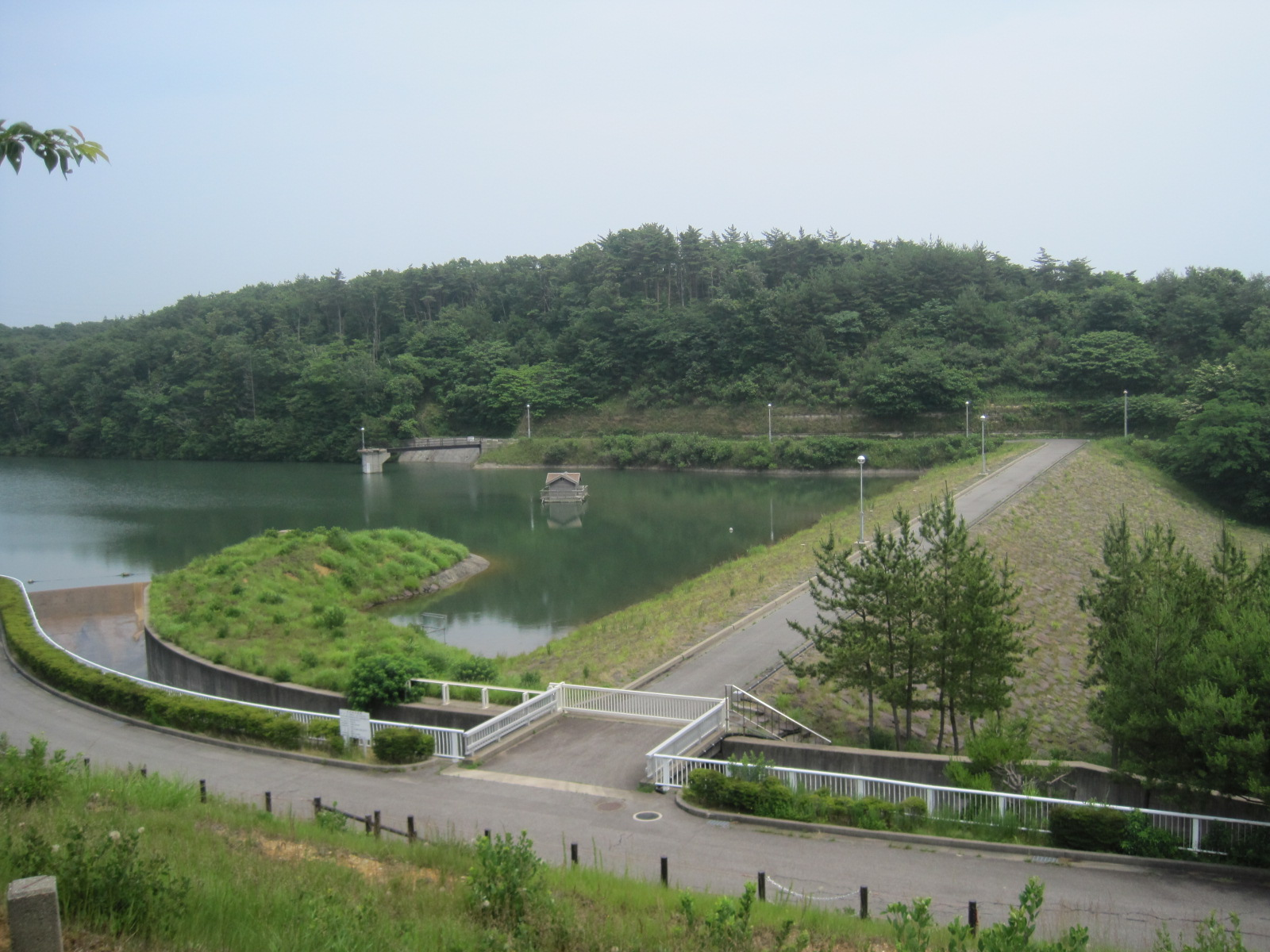
- Official name: 大坪川ダム
- Location: Ishikawa Prefecture, Japan
- Construction began: 1986
- Opening date: 1992

Dam and spillways
- Height: 20.3 m (67 ft)
- Length: 132 m (433 ft)

Reservoir
- Total capacity: 490thousand cubic meters
- Catchment area: 1.4 km^{2} (0.54 sq mi)
- Surface area: 93 hectares (230 acres)

Ohtsubogawa Dam (Japanese: 大坪川ダム) is an earthfill dam located in Ishikawa Prefecture in Japan. The dam is used for irrigation. The catchment area of the dam is 0.9 km^{2}. The dam impounds about 93 ha of land when full and can store 490 thousand cubic meters of water. The construction of the dam was started on 1986 and completed in 1992.

== See also ==
- List of dams in Japan
