= Yamaguchi Bosai Dam =

Dam in Ishikawa Prefecture, Japan

- Location within Japan
- Official name: 山口防災ダム
- Location: Ishikawa Prefecture, Japan
- Coordinates: 37°20′20″N 137°11′00″E
- Opening date: 1970

Dam and spillways
- Height: 27 m (89 ft)
- Length: 110 m (360 ft)

Reservoir
- Total capacity: 392,000 m^{3} (13,800,000 cu ft)
- Catchment area: 4.7 km^{2} (1.8 sq mi)
- Surface area: 5 hectares (12 acres)

Yamaguchi Bosai Dam (Japanese: 山口防災ダム) is a rockfill dam located in Ishikawa Prefecture in Japan. The dam is used for flood control. The catchment area of the dam is 4.7 km^{2}. The dam impounds about 5 ha of land when full and can store 392 thousand cubic meters of water. The construction of the dam was completed in 1970.

== See also ==
- List of dams in Japan
