= Tedorigawa No.3 Dam =

Dam in Ishikawa Prefecture, Japan

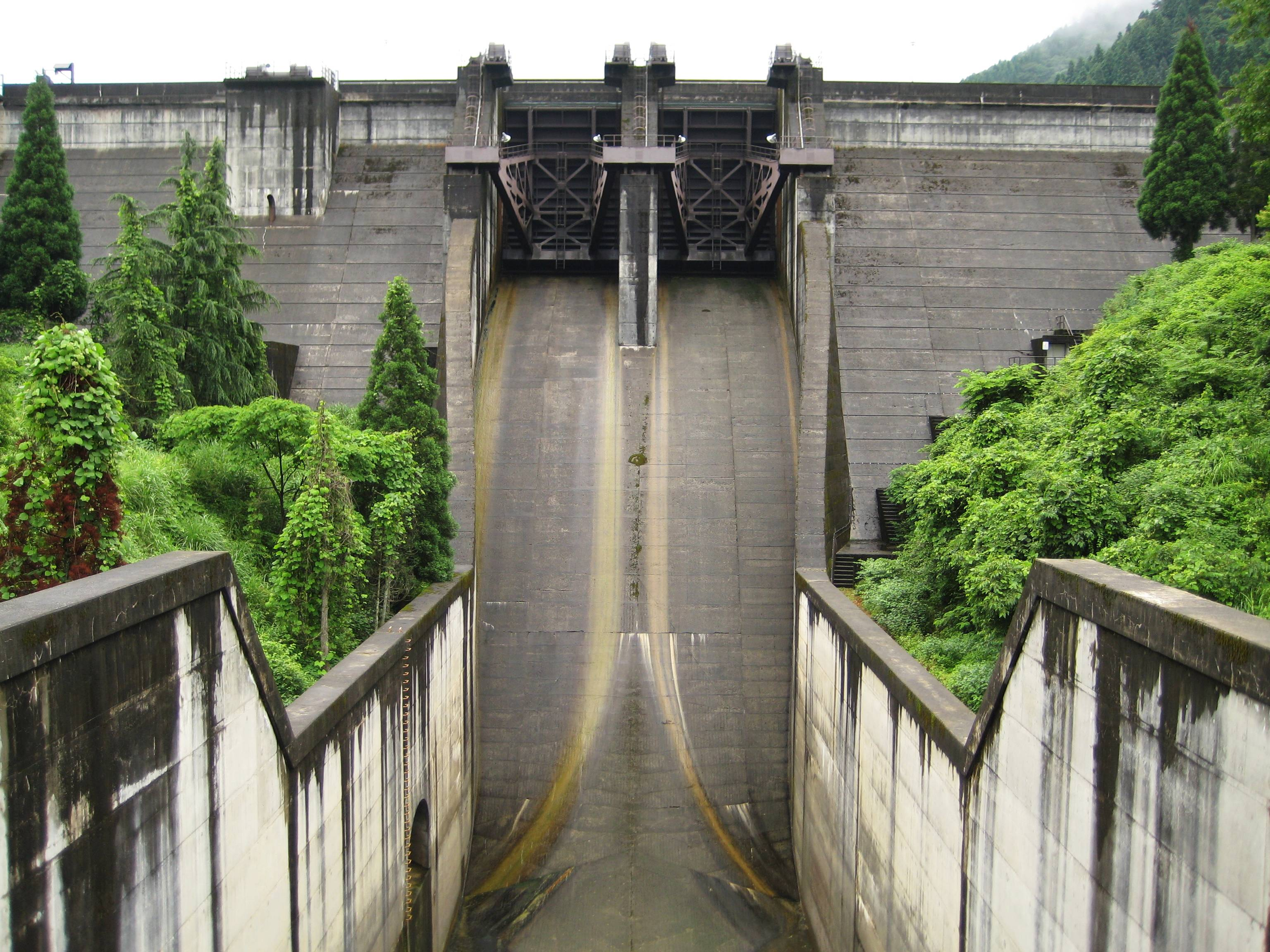

- Location within Japan
- Official name: 手取川第３ダム
- Location: Ishikawa Prefecture, Japan
- Coordinates: 36°24′00″N 136°38′03″E
- Construction began: 1972
- Opening date: 1978

Dam and spillways
- Height: 50 m (160 ft)
- Length: 354 m (1,161 ft)

Reservoir
- Total capacity: 4,247,000 m^{3} (150,000,000 cu ft)
- Catchment area: 527.5 km^{2} (203.7 sq mi)
- Surface area: 33 hectares (82 acres)

Tedorigawa No.3 Dam (Japanese: 手取川第３ダム) is a gravity dam located in Ishikawa Prefecture in Japan. The dam is used for power production. The catchment area of the dam is 527.5 km^{2}. The dam impounds about 33 ha of land when full and can store 4247 thousand cubic meters of water. The construction of the dam was started on 1972 and completed in 1978.

== See also ==
- List of dams in Japan
