= Tane Dam =

Dam in Ishikawa Prefecture, Japan

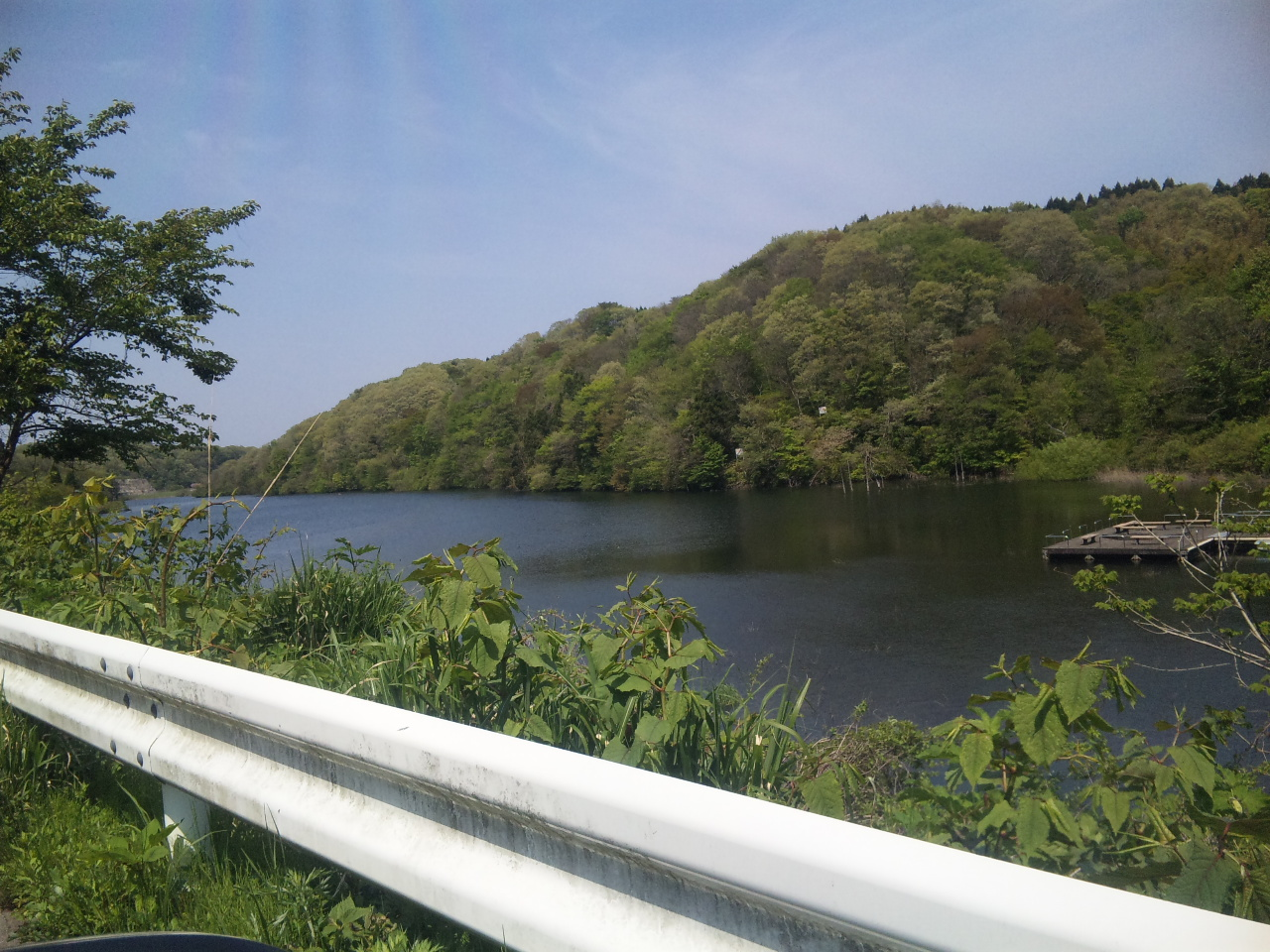

- Location within Japan
- Official name: 多根ダム
- Location: Ishikawa Prefecture, Japan
- Coordinates: 36°59′03″N 136°57′53″E
- Construction began: 1968
- Opening date: 1973

Dam and spillways
- Height: 30 m (98 ft)
- Length: 99.2 m (325 ft)

Reservoir
- Total capacity: 1,334,000 m^{3} (47,100,000 cu ft)
- Catchment area: 2.2 km^{2} (0.85 sq mi)
- Surface area: 16 hectares (40 acres)

Tane Dam (Japanese: 多根ダム) is a rockfill dam located in Ishikawa Prefecture in Japan. The dam is used for irrigation. The catchment area of the dam is 2.2 km^{2}. The dam impounds about 16 ha of land when full and can store 1334 thousand cubic meters of water. The construction of the dam was started on 1968 and completed in 1973.

== See also ==
- List of dams in Japan
