= Iō Dam =

Coordinates: 36°33′40″N 136°46′42″E

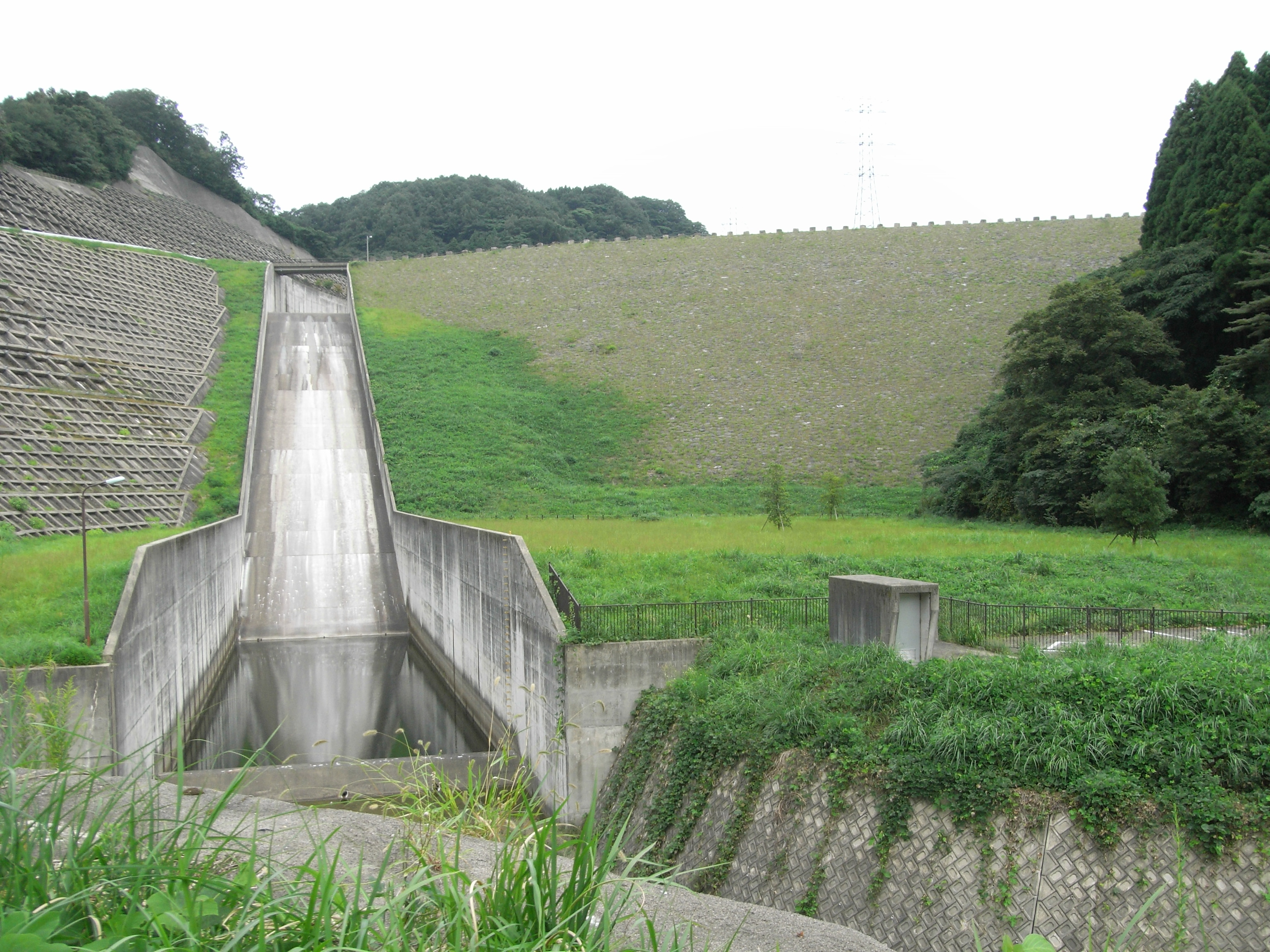
- Interactive map of Iō Dam
- Location: Kanazawa, Ishikawa, Japan
- Construction began: 1977
- Opening date: 2001

Dam and spillways
- Height: 58.8 m (193 ft)
- Length: 208.2 m (683 ft)
- Dam volume: 593,000 m^{3}

Reservoir
- Total capacity: 3,188,000 m^{3}
- Catchment area: 9.7 km^{2}
- Surface area: 27 ha

Iō Dam (医王ダム, Iō damu) is a dam in Kanazawa, Ishikawa Prefecture, Japan, completed in 2001.
