= Akaze Dam =

Dam in Ishikawa Prefecture, Japan

- Location within Japan
- Official name: 赤瀬ダム
- Location: Ishikawa Prefecture, Japan
- Coordinates: 36°17′46″N 136°29′04″E
- Construction began: 1968
- Opening date: 1978

Dam and spillways
- Height: 38 m (125 ft)
- Length: 180 m (590 ft)

Reservoir
- Total capacity: 6000 thousand cubic meters
- Catchment area: 40.6 sq. km
- Surface area: 54 hectares

Akaze Dam (Japanese: 赤瀬ダム) is a gravity dam located in Ishikawa Prefecture in Japan. The dam is used for flood control. The catchment area of the dam is 40.6 km^{2}. The dam impounds about 54 ha of land when full and can store 6000 thousand cubic meters of water. The construction of the dam was started on 1968 and completed in 1978.

== See also ==
- List of dams in Japan
