= Dainichigawa Dam (Hyōgo) =

Dam in Hyogo Prefecture, Japan

- Location within Japan
- Interactive map of Dainichigawa Dam
- Official name: 大日川ダム
- Location: Hyogo Prefecture, Japan
- Coordinates: 34°14′17″N 134°46′45″E
- Opening date: 1966

Dam and spillways
- Height: 42.8 m (140 ft)
- Length: 178 m (584 ft)

Reservoir
- Total capacity: 2099 thousand cubic meters
- Catchment area: sq. km
- Surface area: 16 hectares

Dainichigawa Dam (Japanese: 大日川ダム) is a gravity dam located in Hyogo Prefecture in Japan. The dam is used for irrigation. The dam impounds about 16 ha of land when full and can store 2099 thousand cubic meters of water. The construction of the dam was completed in 1966.

== See also ==
- List of dams in Japan
