= Teradagawa Dam =

Dam in Ishikawa Prefecture, Japan

- Location within Japan
- Official name: 寺田川ダム
- Location: Ishikawa Prefecture, Japan
- Coordinates: 37°18′00″N 137°3′04″E
- Construction began: 1996
- Opening date: 2007

Dam and spillways
- Height: 26.7 m (88 ft)
- Length: 103.8 m (341 ft)

Reservoir
- Total capacity: 460,000 m^{3} (16,000,000 cu ft)
- Catchment area: 2.3 km^{2} (0.89 sq mi)
- Surface area: 6 hectares (15 acres)

Teradagawa Dam (Japanese: 寺田川ダム) is a rockfill dam located in Ishikawa Prefecture in Japan. The dam is used for irrigation and water supply. The catchment area of the dam is 2.3 km^{2}. The dam impounds about 6 ha of land when full and can store 460 thousand cubic meters of water. The construction of the dam was started on 1996 and completed in 2007.

== See also ==
- List of dams in Japan
