= Dainichigawa Dam (Ishikawa) =

Dam in Ishikawa Prefecture, Japan

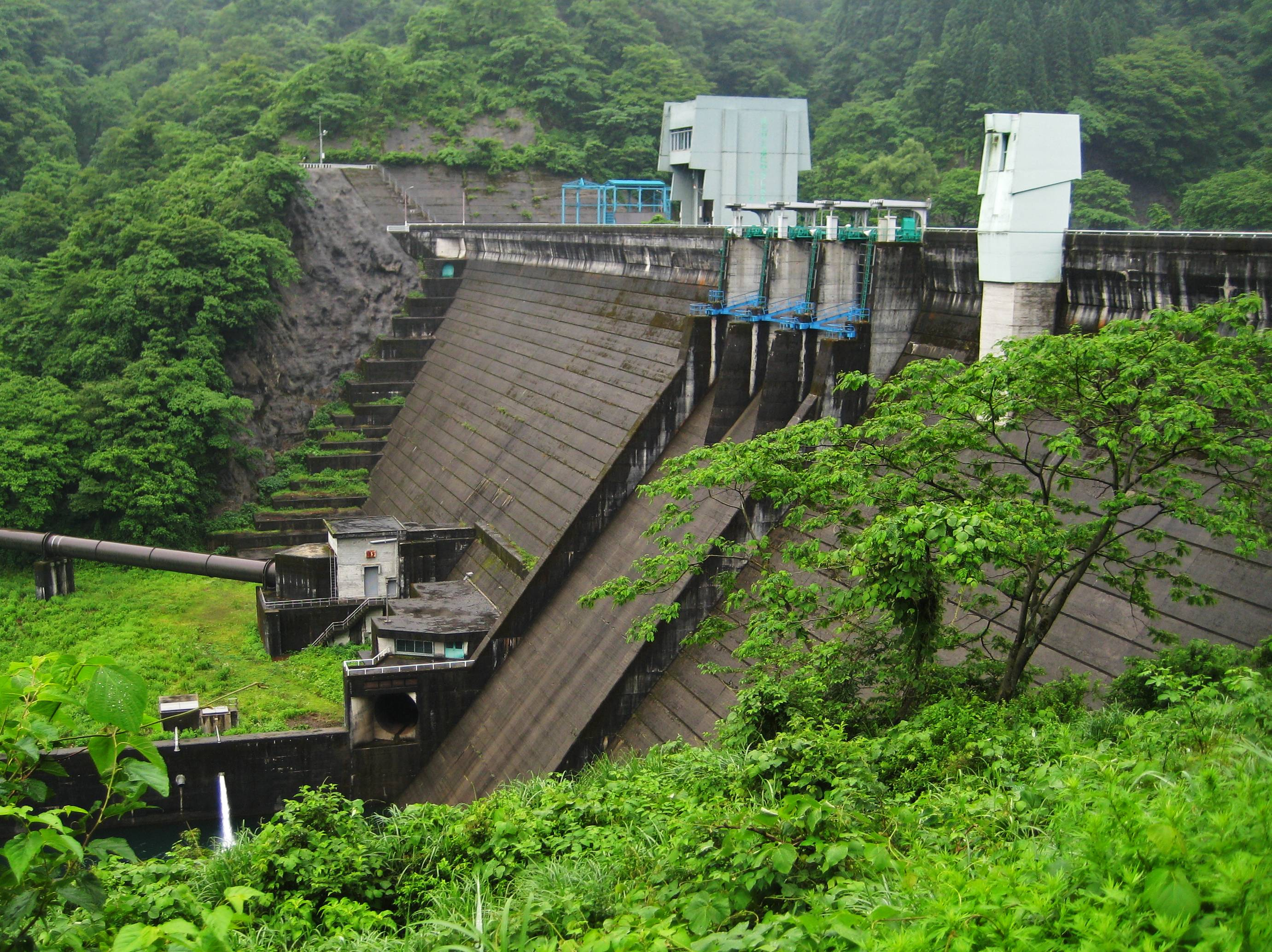

- Location within Japan
- Official name: 大日川ダム
- Location: Hakusan, Ishikawa, Japan
- Coordinates: 36°17′23″N 136°34′43″E
- Construction began: 1952
- Opening date: 1976

Dam and spillways
- Type of dam: Concrete Gravity Dam
- Impounds: Dainichigawa River
- Height: 59.9 m (197 ft)
- Length: 238.0 m (780.8 ft)
- Dam volume: 309,000 m^{3}

Reservoir
- Total capacity: 27,200,000 m^{3}
- Catchment area: 83.5 km^{2}
- Surface area: 132 hectares (330 acres)

Power Station
- Operator: Hokuriku Electric Power Company
- Installed capacity: 9,000 kW

Dainichigawa Dam (大日川ダム) is a multipurpose concrete gravity dam in the city of Hakusan, Ishikawa Prefecture, Japan, completed in 1967.

Municipalities along the Tedori River had been plagued by water shortages for decades, with farmers upstream in conflict with farmers further downstream over water rights. A large-scale modern irrigation project was begun by the Japanese government in 1903. The region suffered from major flooding in 1943. As part of ongoing water management efforts, the Dainichigawa Dam was constructed on a branch of the Tedori River from 1952 by Kajima Corporation.
