= Kamiterazu Dam =

Dam in Ishikawa Prefecture, Japan

- Location within Japan
- Interactive map of Kamiterazu Dam
- Official name: 上寺津ダム
- Location: Ishikawa Prefecture, Japan
- Coordinates: 36°27′45″N 136°43′10″E
- Construction began: 1961
- Opening date: 1965

Dam and spillways
- Height: 19.5 m (64 ft)
- Length: 69 m (226 ft)

Reservoir
- Total capacity: 129 thousand cubic meters
- Catchment area: 71 sq. km

Kamiterazu Dam (Japanese: 上寺津ダム) is a gravity dam located in Ishikawa Prefecture in Japan. The dam is used for power production. The catchment area of the dam is 71 km^{2}. The dam can store 129 thousand cubic meters of water. The construction of the dam was started on 1961 and completed in 1965.

== See also ==
- List of dams in Japan
