= Iwasaka Dam =

Dam in Ishikawa Prefecture, Japan

- Location within Japan
- Interactive map of Iwasaka Dam
- Official name: 岩坂ダム
- Location: Ishikawa Prefecture, Japan
- Coordinates: 37°28′16″N 137°15′47″E
- Construction began: 1972
- Opening date: 1984

Dam and spillways
- Height: 31.7 m (104 ft)
- Length: 158 m (518 ft)

Reservoir
- Total capacity: 850 thousand cubic meters
- Catchment area: 4 sq. km
- Surface area: 12 hectares

Iwasaka Dam (Japanese: 岩坂ダム) is an earthfill dam located in Ishikawa Prefecture in Japan. The dam is used for flood control and irrigation. The catchment area of the dam is 4 km^{2}. The dam impounds about 12 ha of land when full and can store 850 thousand cubic meters of water. The construction of the dam was started on 1972 and completed in 1984.

== See also ==
- List of dams in Japan
