= Uchikawa Dam =

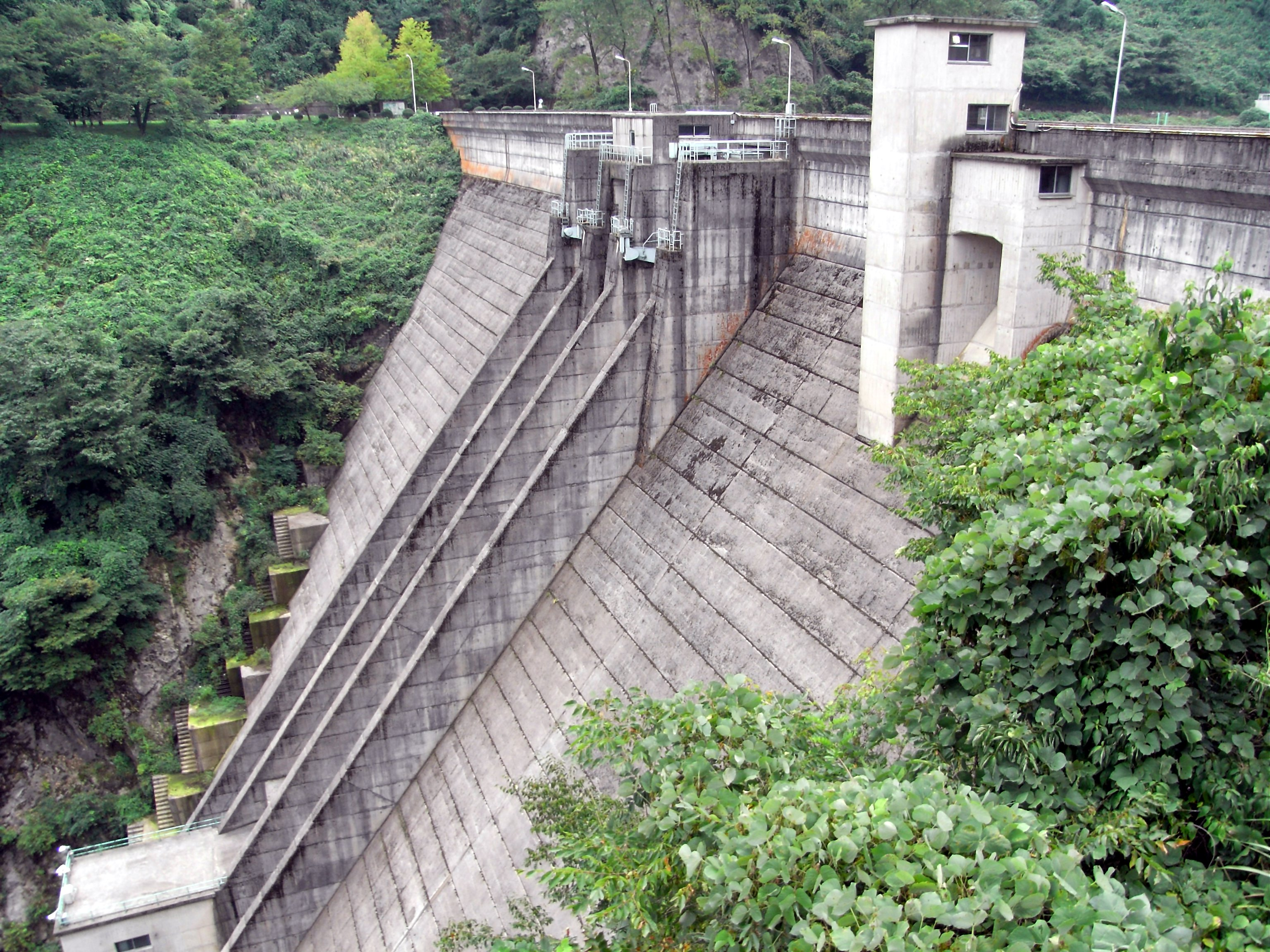
- Interactive map of Uchikawa Dam
- Location: Ishikawa Prefecture, Japan
- Coordinates: 36°28′23″N 136°40′15″E

Uchikawa Dam is a dam in the Ishikawa Prefecture of Japan, completed in 1974.
