= Oguchi Dam =

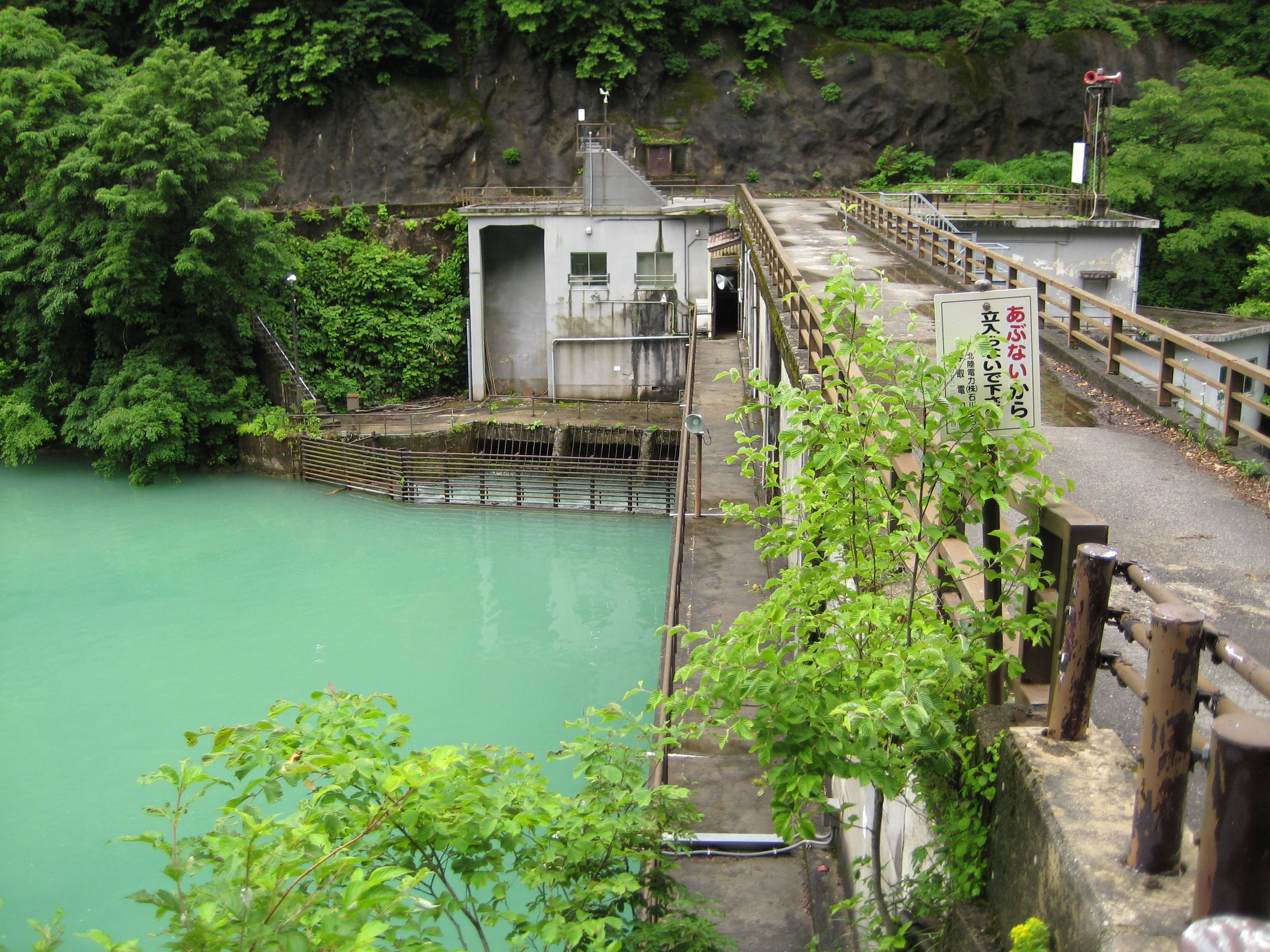
- Interactive map of Oguchi Dam
- Location: Ishikawa Prefecture, Japan
- Coordinates: 36°15′21″N 136°44′27″E

Oguchi Dam is a dam in the Ishikawa Prefecture of Japan, completed in 1938.
