= Saigawa Dam (Nagano) =

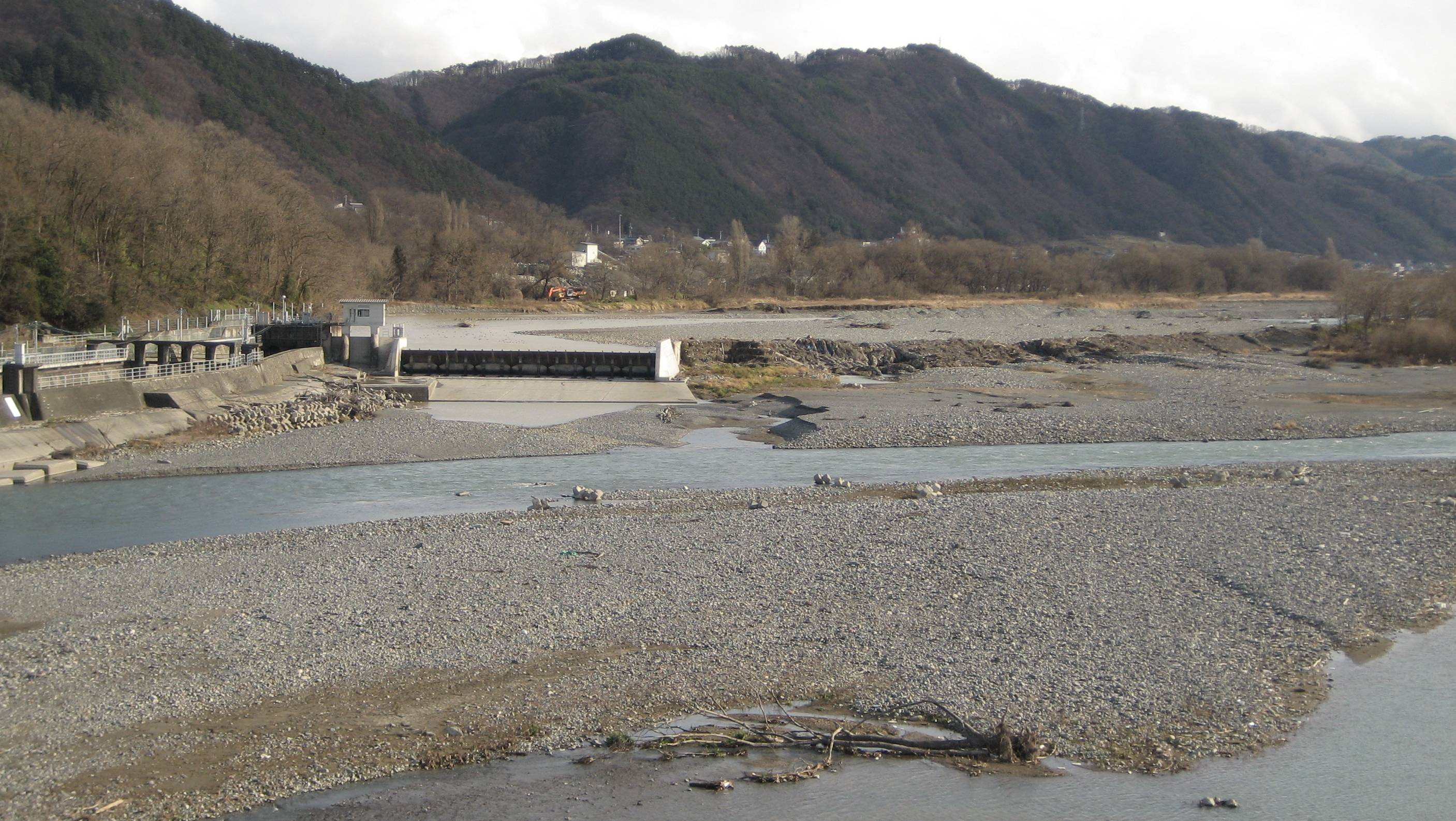
- Interactive map of Saigawa Dam
- Location: Nagano Prefecture, Japan
- Coordinates: 36°18′25.6926″N 137°55′51.099″E
- Opening date: 1923
- Owner: Chubu Electric Power (Chuden)

Dam and spillways
- Height: 2.95 m (9.7 ft)
- Length: 268 m (879 ft)

Power Station
- Installed capacity: 1700 kW

Saigawa Dam (犀川ダム, Saigawa-damu) is a dam in Nagano Prefecture, Japan on the Sai River. Its lake is also known as Swan Lake (白鳥湖, Hakuchō-ko) for the swans that come every winter.
