= Yoshinodani Dam =

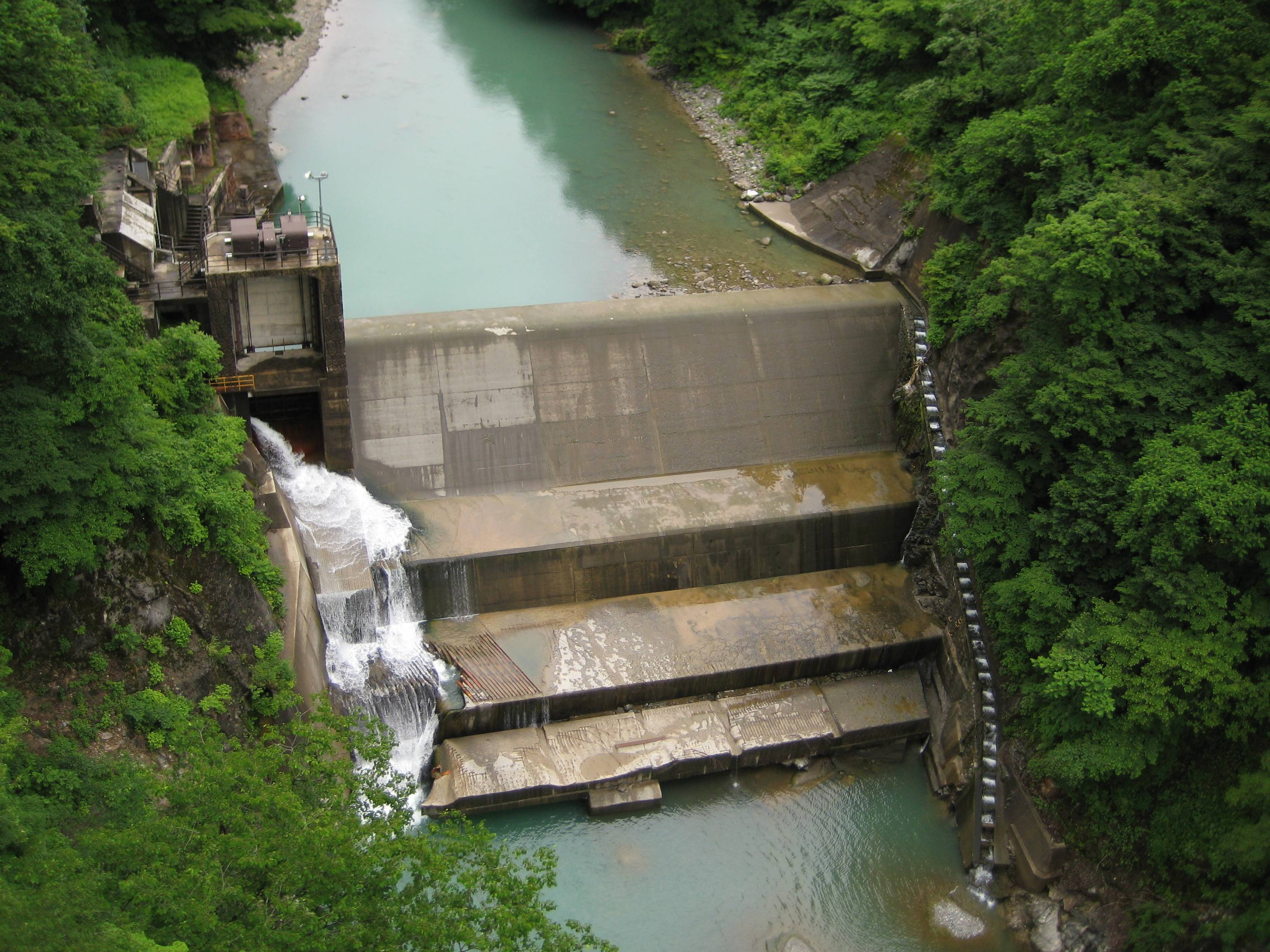

- Location within Japan
- Location: Ishikawa Prefecture, Japan
- Coordinates: 36°16′25″N 136°41′12″E

Yoshinodani Dam is a dam in the Ishikawa Prefecture of Japan, completed in 1926.
