= Saigawa Dam (Ishikawa) =

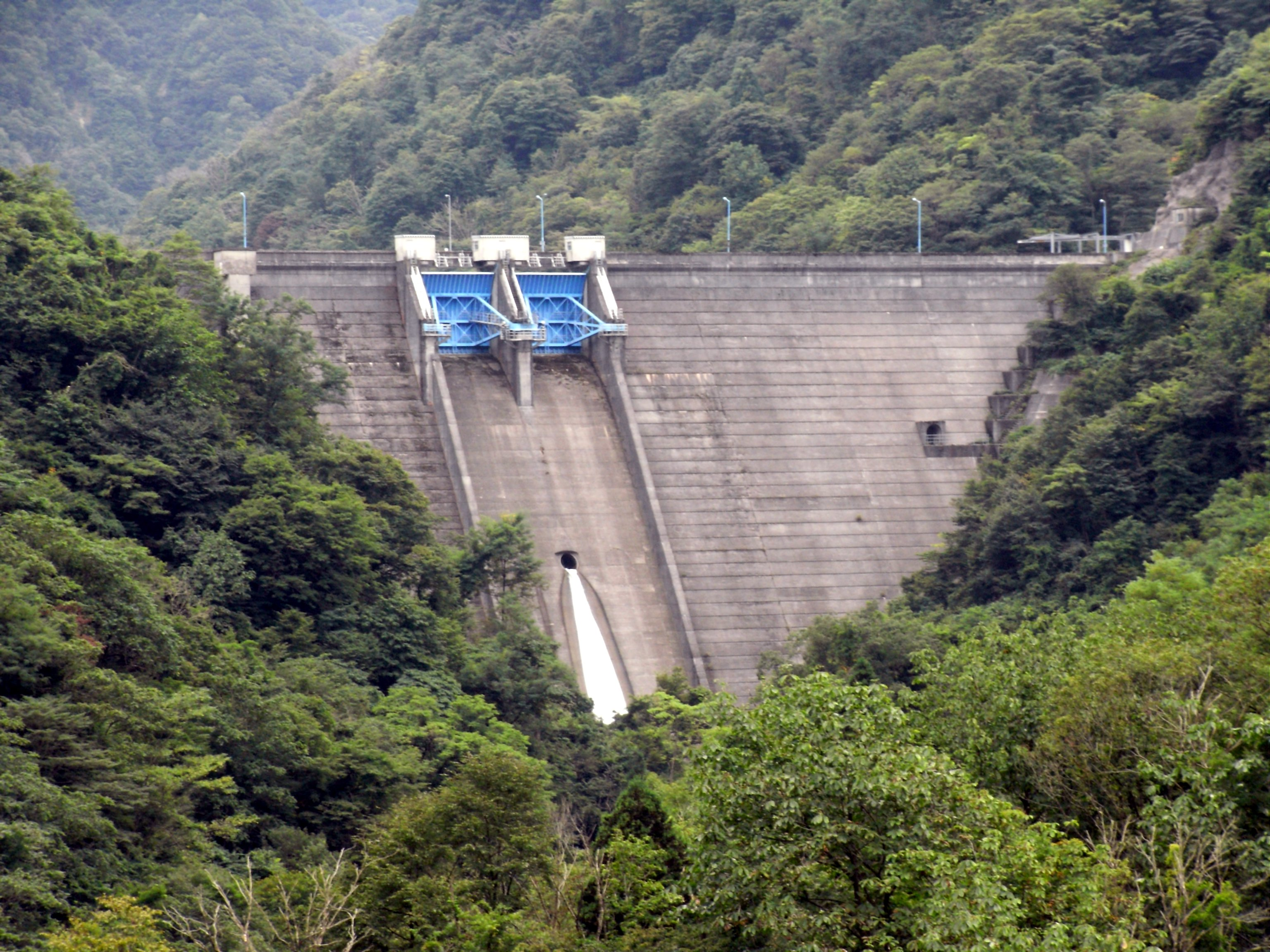
- Interactive map of Saigawa Dam
- Location: Ishikawa Prefecture, Japan
- Coordinates: 36°25′51″N 136°44′48″E

Saigawa Dam is a dam in the Ishikawa Prefecture of Japan, completed in 1965.
