= Radeberger Brewery =

German brewery

Radeberger Exportbierbrauerei GmbH

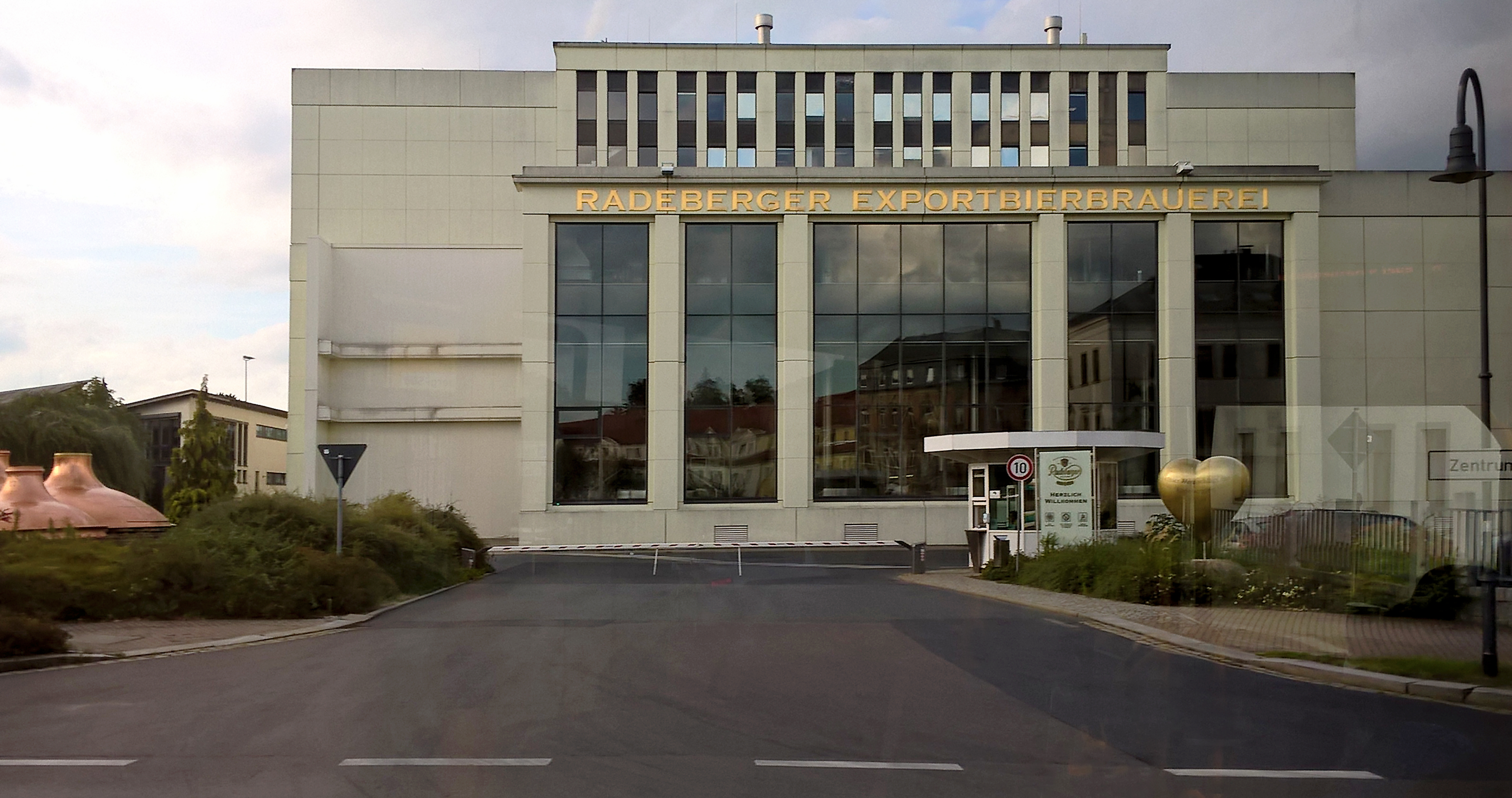
- Interactive map of Radeberger Exportbierbrauerei GmbH
- Location: Radeberg, Saxony, Germany
- Coordinates: 51°06′57″N 13°54′50″E
- Opened: 1872
- Annual production volume: 1.90 million hectolitres (1,620,000 US bbl) in 2015
- Owner: Radeberger Group
- Parent: Dr. Oetker (since 2004)

Active beers
Name	Type
Radeberger Pilsner	Pilsner

Radeberger started in 1872 when the brewery was founded as Zum Bergkeller, in Radeberg, a town in the vicinity of Dresden. Radeberger ranks No. 9 among Germany's best selling beers.

== History ==
In 1872 the Aktienbrauerei zum Bergkeller (Joint-stock Brewery at the Berg Cellar) was founded by Gustav Adolf Eduard Philipp together with August Max Rumpelt, Julius Schöne, Carl Hermann Rasche, and Heinrich Eduard Minckwitz. This beer was also brewed for a period for the King of Saxony. It was the first brewery in Germany to brew beer exclusively in the Pilsner style that still exists today. Radeberger elected to change its name to the present name of Radeberger Exportbierbrauerei. This change came in 1885 when they began shipping across borders. By the late 1880s, the brewer's numbers had risen to 300,000 cases per year. The first German chancellor, Otto von Bismarck elevated Radeberger Pilsner to "Kanzler-Bräu" (chancellor brew) in 1887. The brewery takes pride in the fact that in 1905, Radeberger Pilsner became the favourite drink of king Frederick Augustus III of Saxony. Also that same year, Radeberger began to export to the USA and Canada.

In 1946, the communist East German government took control of the brewery. In 1954, the company began to export worldwide. In 1990, after the fall of the Berlin Wall, Binding Brauerei purchased the company and returned its sales to West Germany. After the purchase, the brewery underwent comprehensive renovations to bring the brewery up to speed with modern brewing. By 1994, it expanded to 1 million Hectoliter production rate. In 2004, Oetker Gruppe purchased the company and removed them from the stock market, thus making Radeberger a private company.

Radeberger was the favourite beer of the character Charlie Harper in the TV series Two and a Half Men due to a cooperation with the brewery. Vladimir Putin, assigned by the KGB to their office in Dresden, DDR, in the 1980s, assisting the East German Stasi and also supervising them, acquired a taste for Radeberger, which remains his preferred beer, in Russia, and when he travels to the European Union.

They also brew 'Uberbrau' for Wesfarmers in the Australian market.

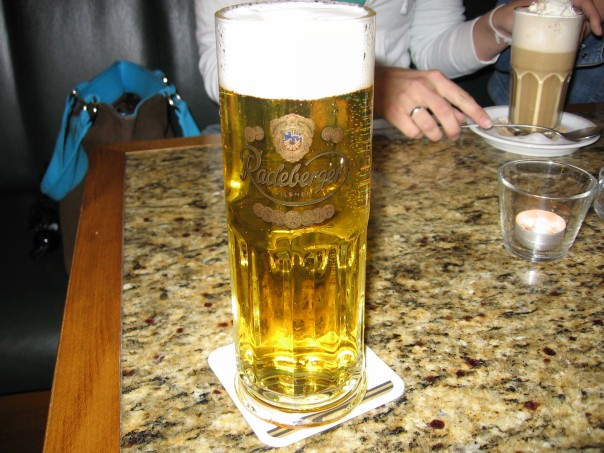
Glass of Radeberger Pilsner

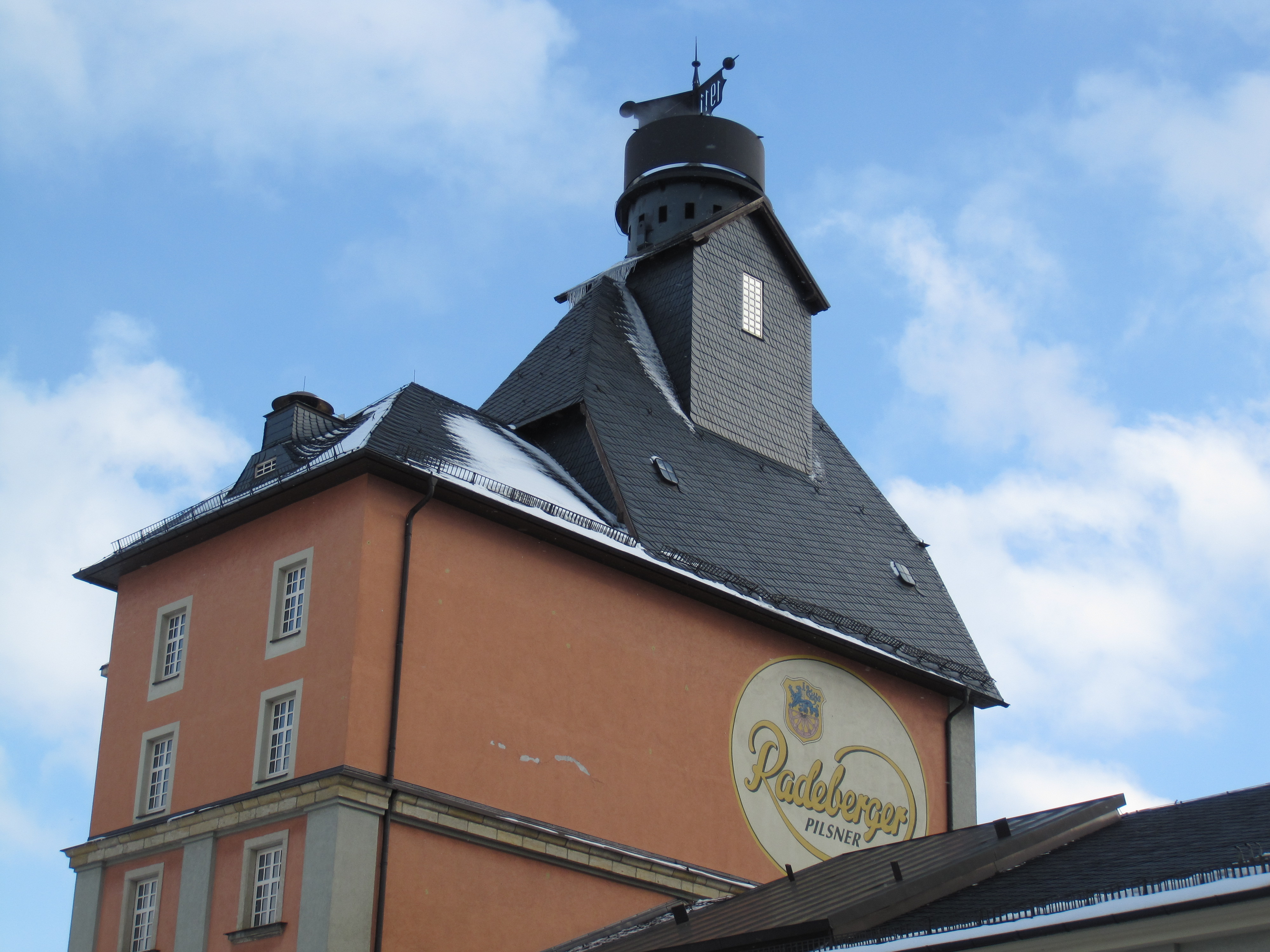
Radeberger Brewery - old main brewery building

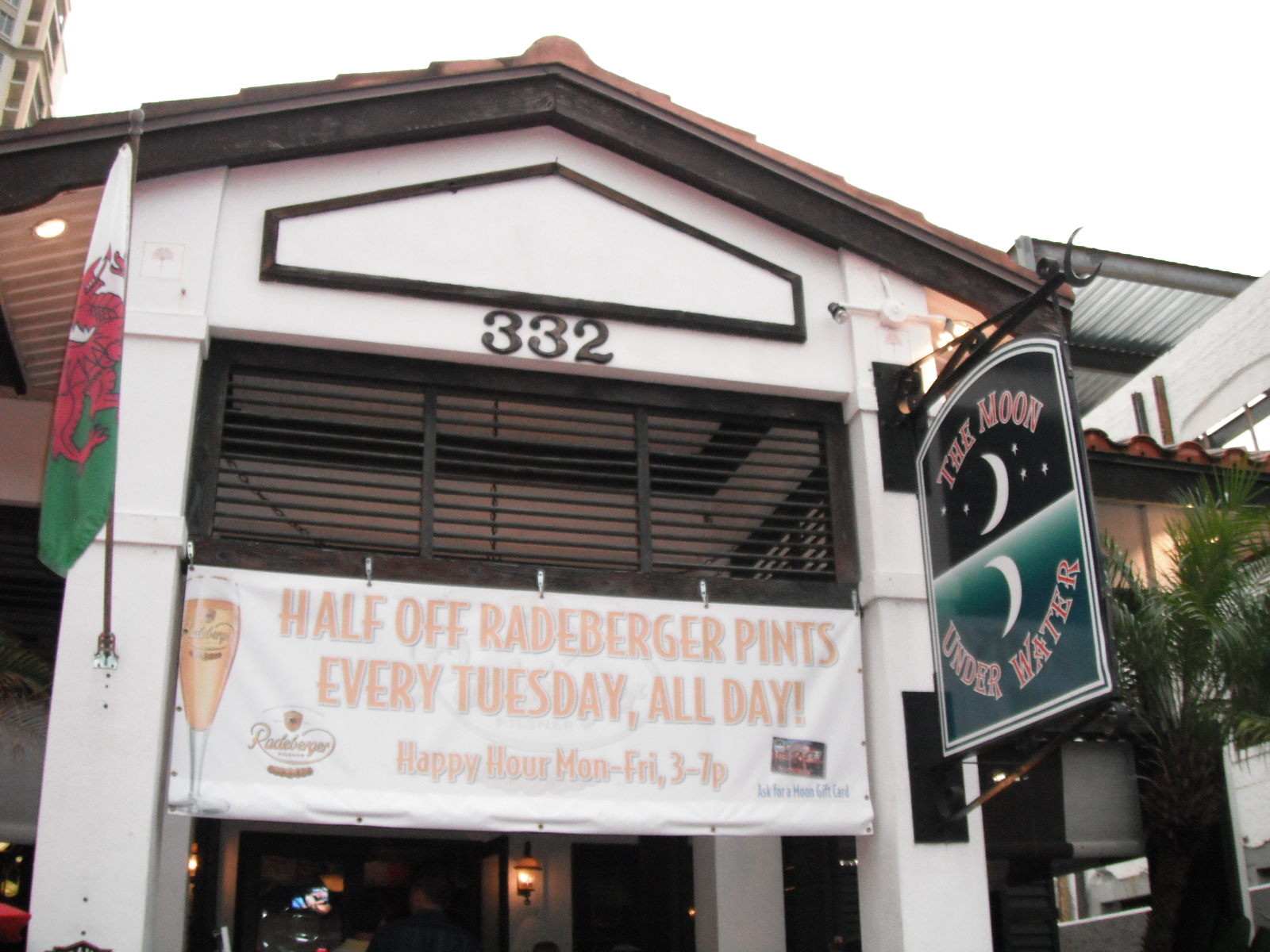
St. Petersburg, Florida/USA

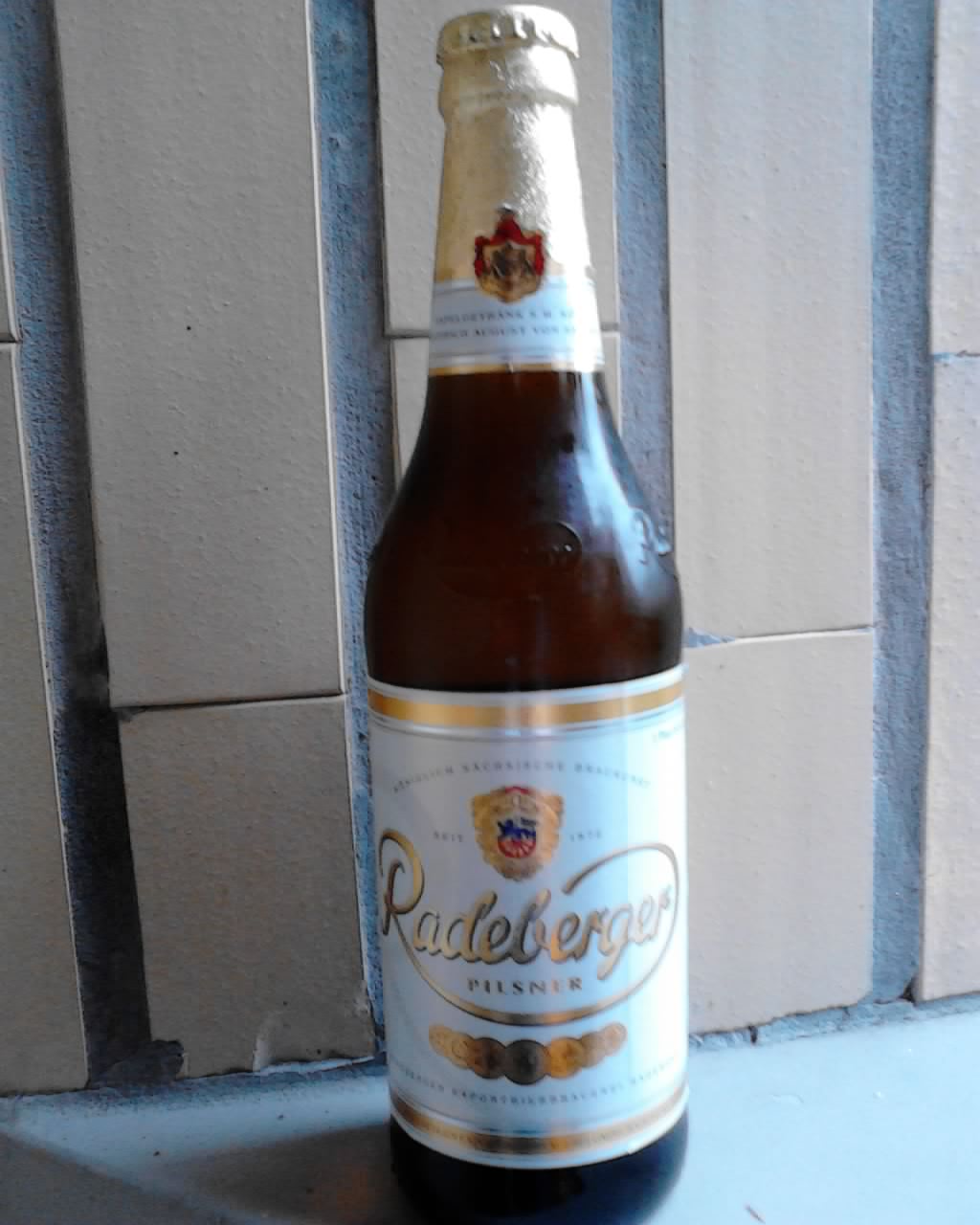
Bottle of Radeberger Pilsner

== See also ==
- Henninger Brewery
- List of brewing companies in Germany
