= Sternburg =

German beer brand

Sternburg Brauerei GmbH
- Interactive map of Sternburg Brauerei GmbH
- Location: Leipzig, Germany
- Coordinates: 51°19′49″N 12°24′5″E
- Opened: 1822
- Annual production volume: 1.1 million hectolitres (940,000 US bbl) in 2013
- Owner: Radeberger Group
- Parent: Dr. Oetker
- Website: sternburg-bier.de

Sternburg (German pronunciation: [ˈʃtɛʁnbʊʁk]; commonly referred to as Sterni) is a brand of German beer, brewed and bottled by Radeberger Group. Their best selling product is "Sternburg Export". In 2006 it had 9.5% of the market share in Eastern Germany.

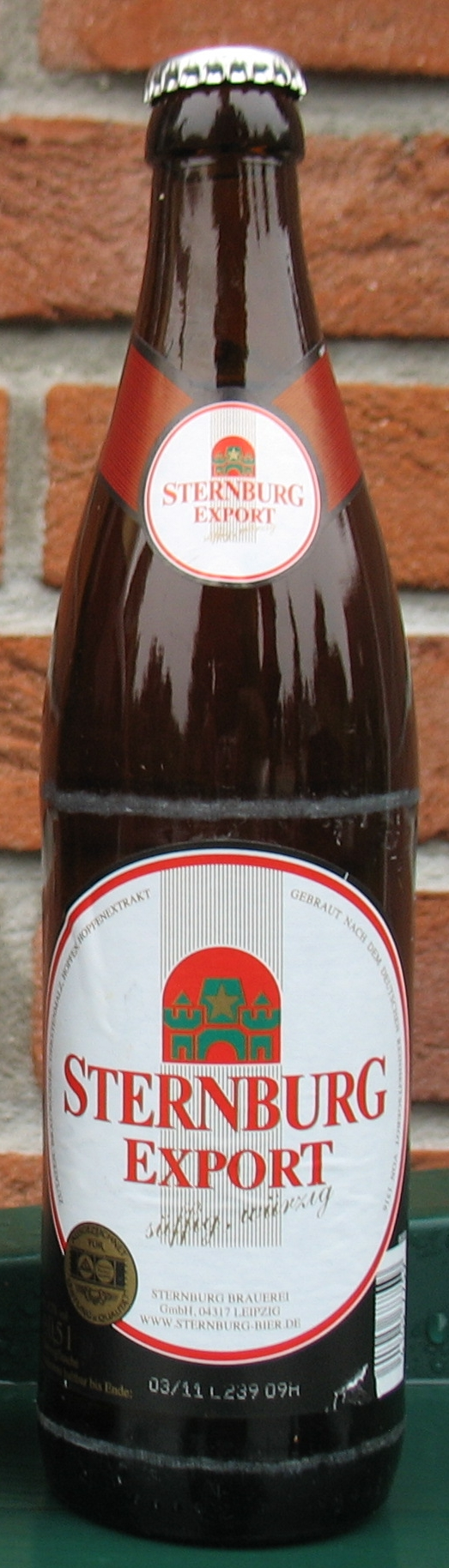
A bottle of Sternburg Export

== History ==
The history of Sternburg goes back to 1278, to the brewery of a Rittergut, which lies between Elster and Mühlteich. The location was purchased by Wilhelm von Mechfritz in 1405. In 1822, Leipzig wool merchant Maximilian Speck von Sternburg bought the estate of Lützschena, which included the brewery, as grazing ground for his sheep. Whilst on a trip to Bavaria, Speck recruited a brewmaster from St. Vitus' Abbey to brew his beer.

When Speck entered the gentry, he asked to add the name of "von Sternburg" to his title. However, he was not allowed to sell the beer at its current location in Leipzig and so he moved production to the cellar of a castle in Leipzig, and in April 1823 he received a permit from the Leipzig city council. From that point onward he sold an average of 300,000 liters of beer per year.

In 1948 the ownership of the brewery was made public as was common under the government of the newly formed state of East Germany (GDR), and in 1968 it was absorbed into the state-run Volkseigener Betrieb drink management organization in Leipzig. After re-unification in 1990, it once again became an independent venture, "Sternburg Brauerei GmbH," in cooperation with Stuttgarter Hofbräu. Demand for exportation fell to 600,000 liters per year, and so Sachsenbräu AG bought the business and closed the brewery at Lützschena, continuing production instead at the Reudnitzer Brewery.

In 1992 the brands "Sternburg Export" and "Sternburg Pilsner" became discount brands. In 1997 "Sternburg Schwarzbier" and "Sternburg Export" received the seal of approval from the quality-management bureau "CMA-Gütesiegel," and one year later "Sternburg Pilsner" also received this designation, followed by "Sternburg Schwarzbier" in 1999. In 2002 Sternburg Export was 48% of Germany's beer exports and the variety "Sternburg Radler" was introduced. "Sternburg Diesel" followed in 2003 and "Sternburg Doppelkaramel" in 2004. The last addition was in 2005 with the introduction of "Sternburg Hefeweizen."

== Magazine ==
The brand Sternburg has its own fan magazine. "Sterni" magazine is published as a PDF online at the homepage of the brewery. Inside are stories from fans of the brand, and bands that have written songs about the beer. Reader-interactivity plays a large role; readers can express opinions about music or their favorite types of beer.

== Current products ==
Name	Type	Alcohol %	Label
Sternburg Export	Export	5.2%	White and Red
Sternburg Export Alkoholfrei	Non-alcoholic beer	<0,5%	Blue
Sternburg Pilsner	Pilsner	4.9%	Gold
Sternburg Diesel	Diesel	2.6%	Brown
Sternburg Radler	Radler	2.6%	Yellow

== Various Names of Brand in Chronological Order ==
- 1883: Alexander Freiherr Speck von Sternburg'sche Dampfbrauerei
- 1912: Freiherrlich von Sternburg'sche Brauerei
- 1948: Brauerei Sternburg GmbH
- 1949: VVB Venag, VEB Brauerei Sternburg
- 1952: VVB d. Brau- und Malzindustrie, VEB Brauerei Sternburg
- 1958: VEB Brauerei Sternburg Lützschena
- 1964: VEB (K) Brau- und Malzkombinat Sternburg Lützschena, Werk I
- 1969: VEB Brau- und Malzkombinat Sternburg Lützschena, Werk I
- 1990: VEB Exportbierbrauerei Sternburg im VEB Getränkekombinat Leipzig
- 1991: Sternburg Brauerei Lützschena GmbH
