= Dortmunder =

Dortmunder means someone or something from Dortmund, Germany. It may refer to:

- John Dortmunder, a fictional character created by Donald E. Westlake.
- Tod Dortmunder, a fictional character from the TV show Little House on the Prairie.
- Dortmunder Export or Dortmunder, a style of pale lager beer.
- Dortmunder Actien Brauerei, a brewery in Dortmund, Germany.
- Dortmunder SC, a sporting club that was a predecessor to TSC Eintracht Dortmund.
- IAV Dortmunder, a ship of the Alliance in the television science-fiction series Firefly.
- "Dortmunder", an early poem by Samuel Beckett.
