= Kronen =

Former brewery in Dortmund, Germany

Kronen Privatbrauerei Dortmund GmbH
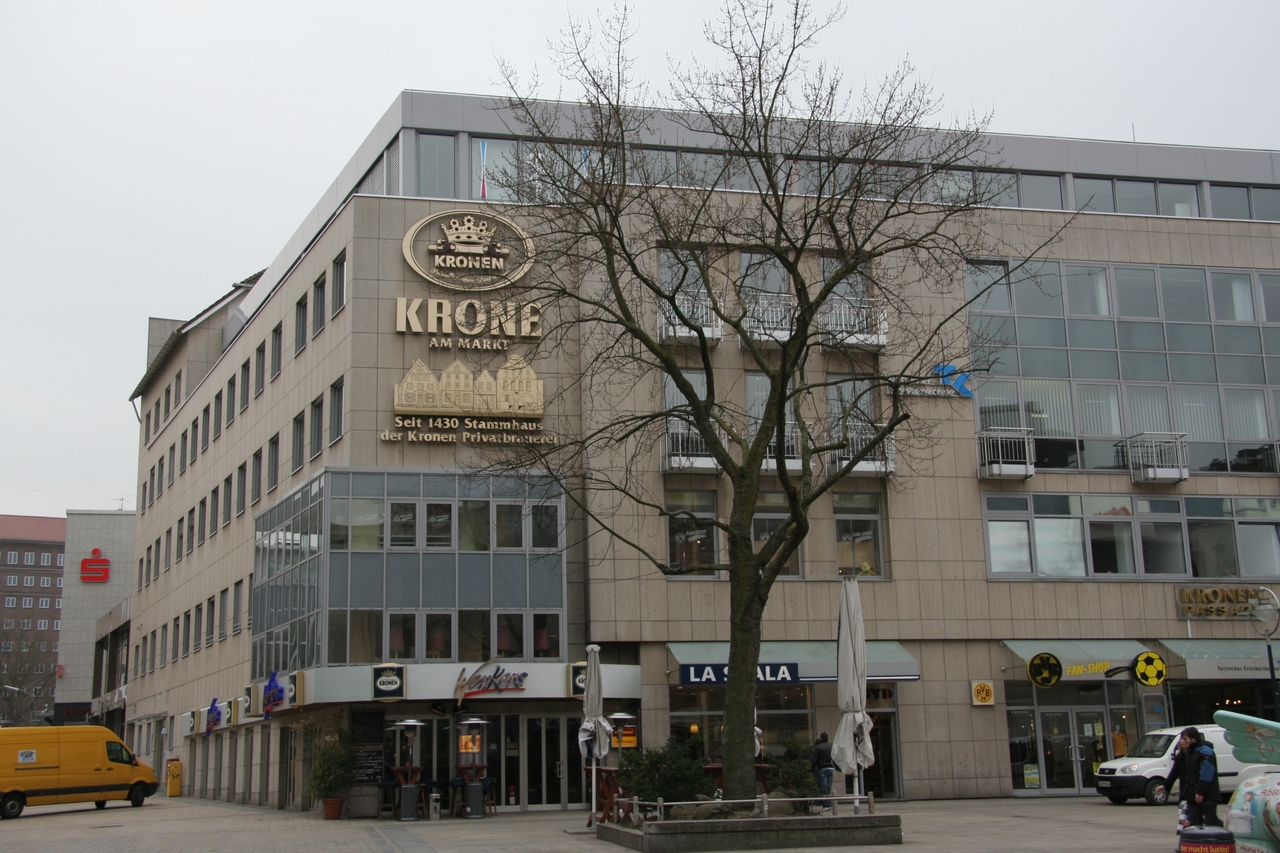
- Kronen Brewery
- Interactive map of Kronen Privatbrauerei Dortmund GmbH
- Location: Dortmund, Germany
- Coordinates: 51°30′11″N 7°28′40″E
- Opened: 1430
- Owner: Radeberger Group
- Website: www.kronen.de

Kronen Brauerei, also known as Private Brewery Dortmund Kronen, was one of the oldest breweries in Westphalia and has its headquarters at the Old Market in Dortmund. The company was able to look back on more than 550 years of brewing tradition and was family-owned from 1729 until 1996. Dortmunder Kronen was a sponsor of Borussia Dortmund between 1992 and 1996. The motto of the partnership was "Kronen und BVB. We are going for Dortmund together." It was acquired by Dortmunder Actien Brauerei in 1996, which is part of the Radeberger Group. The brand continues to be manufactured.

After the brewery moved out of their Old Market headquarters, the site became abandoned and derelict. The former brewery in downtown Dortmund, the Kronenturm, is being redeveloped into an apartment complex.

== See also ==
- List of oldest companies
