= Gustav Adolf Eduard Philipp =

German politician and brewery director (1841–1897)

Gustav Philipp
- Born: Gustav Adolf Eduard Philipp; March 14, 1841; Frauenstein, Kingdom of Saxony
- Died: February 11, 1897; Radeberg, Kingdom of Saxony, German Empire
- Occupations: Politician, brewery director, businessman
- Employer: Radeberger Exportbierbrauerei
- Known for: Co-founder and director of the Radeberger Exportbierbrauerei
- Political party: Deutsche Fortschrittspartei

Gustav Adolf Eduard Philipp (14 March 1841 – 11 February 1897) was a German politician and businessman. He served for more than two decades as a member of the Second Chamber of the Diet of the Kingdom of Saxony and was a co-founder and long time director of the Radeberger Exportbierbrauerei, one of Saxony's first industrial scale breweries.

== Early life and education ==
Philipp was born in Frauenstein, Saxony, the son of Gotthelf Immanuel Philipp (1799–1842), mayor, lawyer and patrimonial judge in Pfaffroda. He received private tuition, later attended the Gymnasium in Freiberg, and then a commercial school. After a three-year apprenticeship at the trading house of Modes in Freiberg he joined the Dresden banking firm Kuntze & Co., where he obtained signing authority (Prokura).

== Business career ==
In 1872 Philipp was among the co-founders and shareholders who established the Aktienbrauerei zum Bergkeller (Joint-stock Brewery at the Berg Cellar) in Radeberg together with August Max Rumpelt, Julius Schöne, Carl Hermann Rasche, and Heinrich Eduard Minckwitz.

By October 1872, advertisements were already seeking bricklayers and general laborers for the new brewery buildings in Radeberg, indicating that construction had begun soon after the company's founding. In March 1873, the company announced a public share issue under its statutes, entering formal operation as a joint stock company.

Philipp became director of the enterprise in 1874, guiding its transition into the Radeberger Exportbierbrauerei, which specialized in a light pilsner beer for domestic and export markets. From 1874 he was the hereditary estate holder (Erblehngerichtsbefitzer) in Kleinwolmsdorf near Radeberg, indicating his growing local involvement.

Under his leadership the brewery expanded production throughout the 1880s. The company's shares ware traded in Leipzig's exchange by 1883. Ads from 1886 showed endorsements from the city's Innkeepers' Association, recommending Radeberger beer to consumers.

Philipp steered the brewery through financial crises in the 1880s, consolidating it into one of Saxony's key export producers. Modern press coverage describes Radeberg's later prosperity as "built on beer", underscoring the long term industrial and cultural significance of Philipp's foundation.

== Political activity ==
A member of the liberal Deutsche Fortschrittspartei (German Progress Party), Philipp represented the ninth rural constituency in the Second Chamber of the Saxon Diet from 1871 until his death in 1897. His 25 years of legislative service were celebrated at the parliament in 1896.

== Personal life ==
In 1869 Philipp married Anna Zenker (born 1848), daughter of estate owner Johann Gotthelf Zenker of Kleinwolmsdorf. Through this marriage Philipp acquired the hereditary estate (Lehngericht) of Kleinwolmsdorf, which he sold in 1884 upon relocating to Dresden. The couple had several children, including Albrecht Philipp (1883–1962), later a member of the Saxon parliament and the Reichstag from 1919 to 1930, and Kurt Philipp (born 1878), a lawyer associated with the Agricultural Credit Association.

Philipp died in Radeberg in 1897 at the age of 55.

== Legacy ==
Gustav Philipp's entrepreneurial and political career links him with Saxony's economic modernization of the late nineteenth century. As co-founder and director of the Radeberger Exportbierbrauerei, he helped establish what later became one of Germany's best known pilsner brands and a lasting industrial institution.

== See also ==
- List of brewing companies in Germany
