= Freiberger Brauhaus =

German brewery

- Native name: Freiberger Brauhaus GmbH
- Company type: Private enterprise
- Industry: Brewery
- Founded: 1266
- Headquarters: Am Fürstenwald, 09599 Freiberg, Germany
- Key people: Steffen Hofmann (management)
- Website: www.freiberger-pils.de

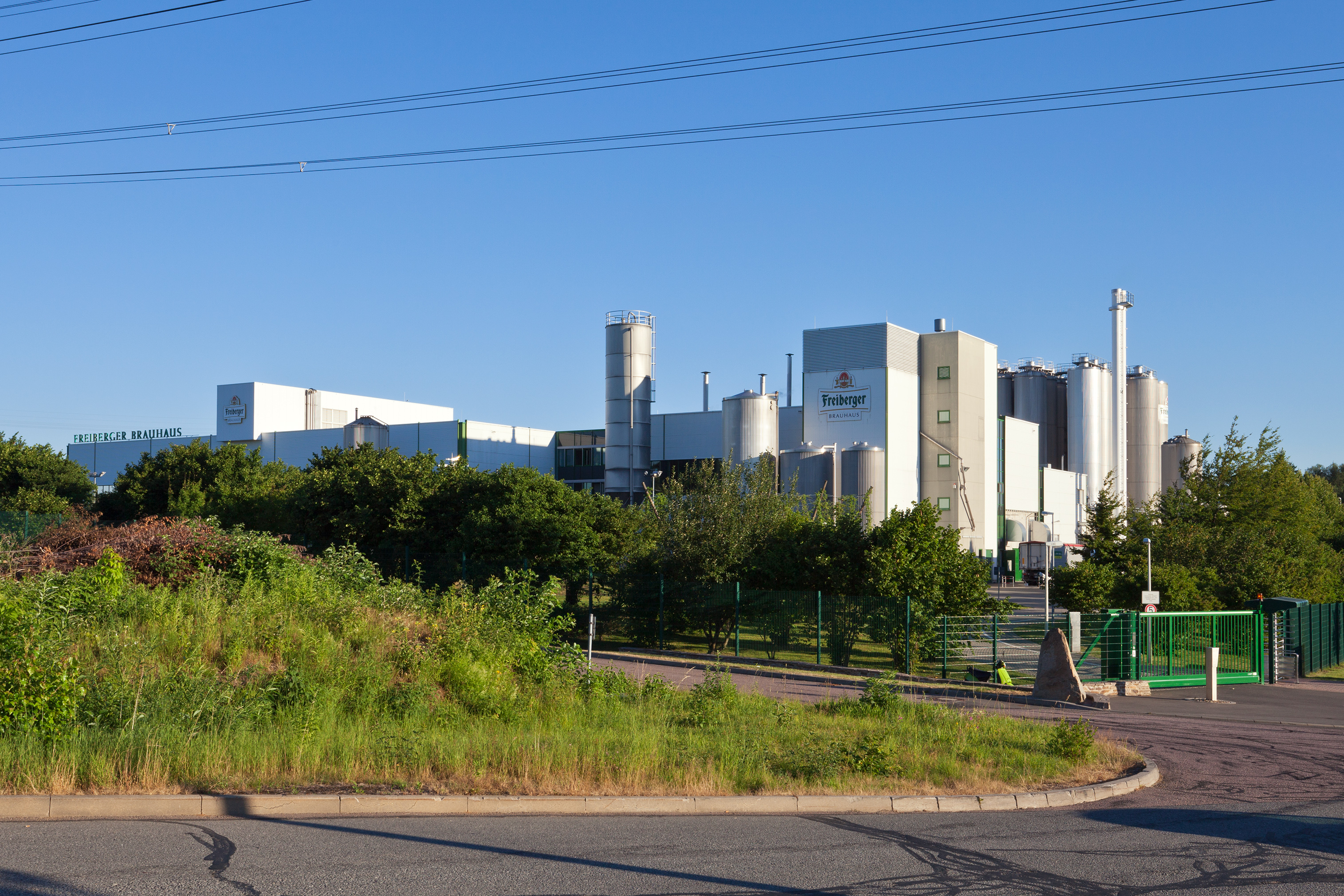
Buildings of Freiberg brewery

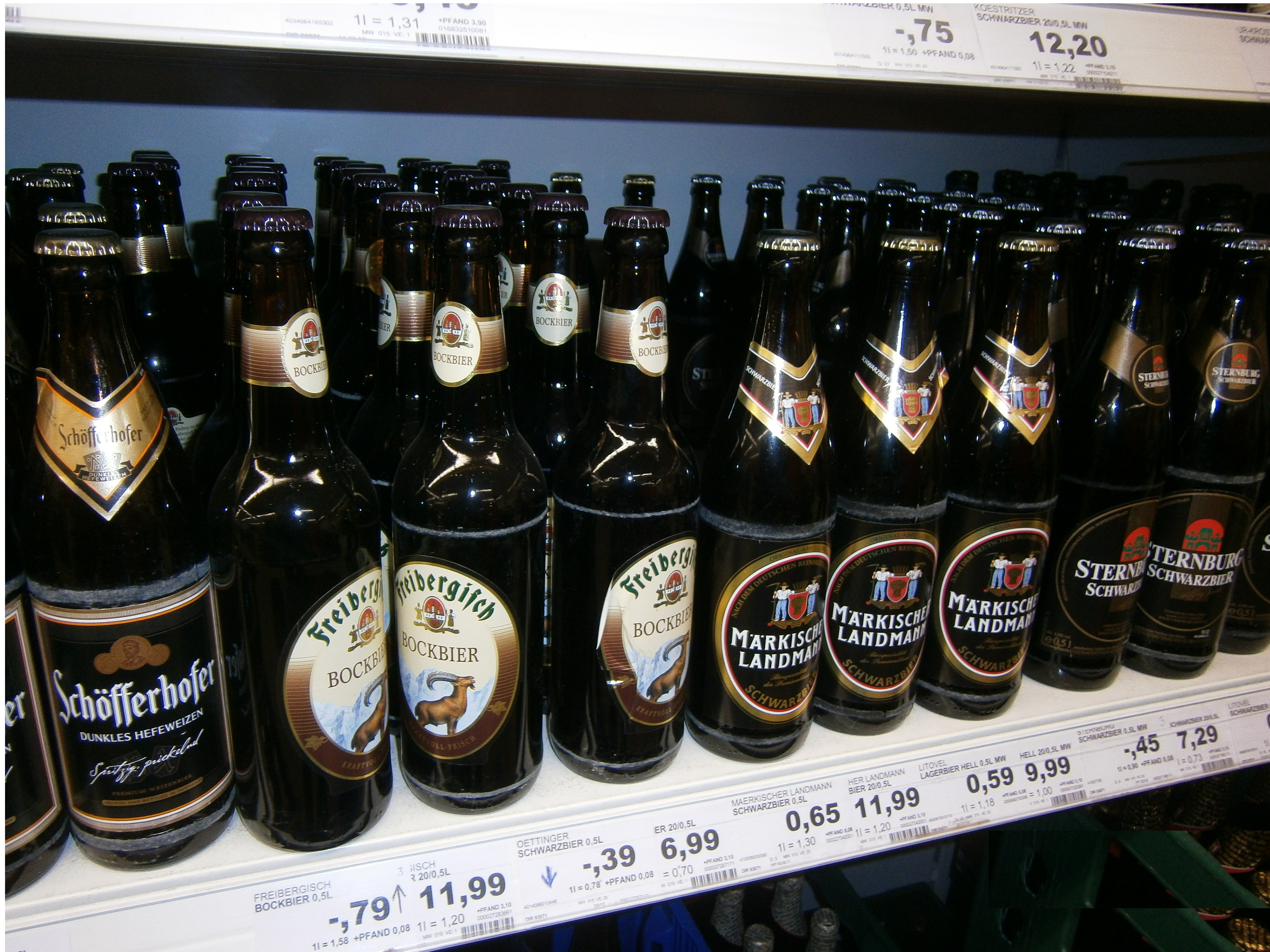
Freiberger beer in bottles

Freiberger Brauhaus is a brewery in Freiberg, and the oldest brewery in Saxony, Germany. The first written record of its existence is a document from 1266 in which Margrave Heinrich gave Freiberg the sole right to supply beer for the Saxon mining region.

2006 the company was sold to German company Radeberger Group, which is part of German company Dr. Oetker.

== Products ==
The recent brewery products include:

- Freiberger Edelkeller Longneck
- Freiberger Alkoholfrei Longneck
- Freibergisch 1863 Jubiläums-Pils Longneck
- Freibergisch Bockbier Longneck
- Freibergisch Schankbier Longneck
- Freibergisch Exportbier Longneck
- Freibergisch Festbier Longneck
- Freibergisch Radler Longneck
- Freibergisch Schwarzbier Longneck
- Meisterbräu Pilsner NRW
- Meisterbräu Export NRW
- Meisterbräu Cola-Bier NRW
- Meisterbräu Zitrone (Radler) NRW

== See also ==
- List of oldest companies
