= Lützschena-Stahmeln =

- Stadtteil of Leipzig
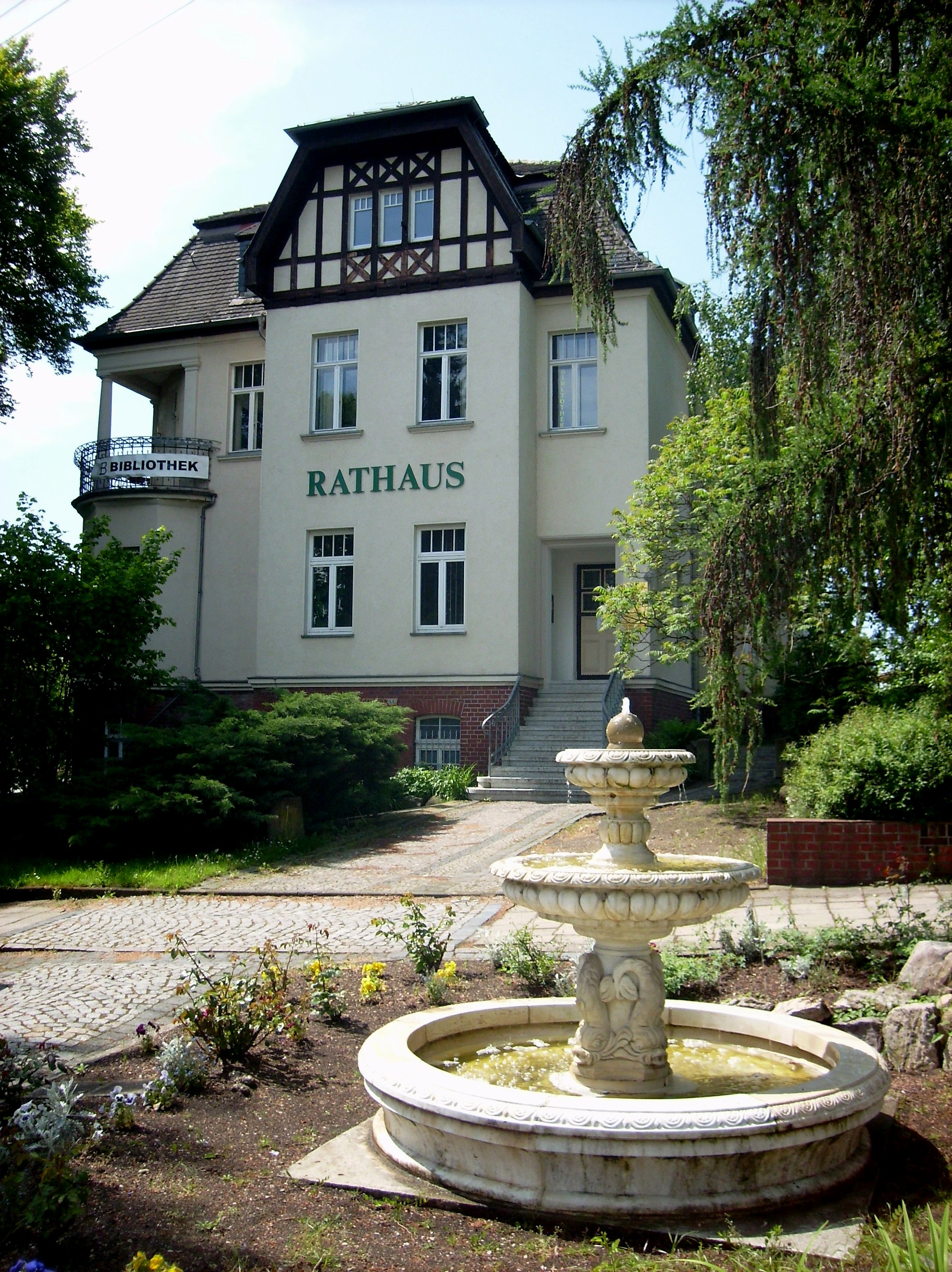
- Old Lützschena Town Hall

- Flag
- Interactive map of Lützschena-Stahmeln
- Location within Germany Location within Saxony
- Coordinates: 51°22′46″N 12°16′51″E
- Country: Germany
- State: Saxony
- District: Urban district
- City: Leipzig

Area
  - Total: 16.86 km^{2} (6.51 sq mi)

Population (2018)
  - Total: 4,115
  - Density: 244.1/km^{2} (632.1/sq mi)
- Time zone: UTC+01:00 (CET)
  - Summer (DST): UTC+02:00 (CEST)
- Postal codes: 04158, 04159
- Dialling codes: 0341

Lützschena-Stahmeln (German pronunciation: [ˈlʏtʃəna ˈʃtaːml̩n]) is a locality in the north-west borough of Leipzig, a few miles upriver on the White Elster in what is now known as 'former' East Germany. It is known as the place where the wool merchant Maximilian Speck von Sternburg worked on his model sheep farm and beer brewery, and is still known today for his namesake: Sternburg.

== Schloss Lützschena ==
The town of Lützschena was once home to an old castle, that was rebuilt several times. It has an adjoining park that is open to the public.

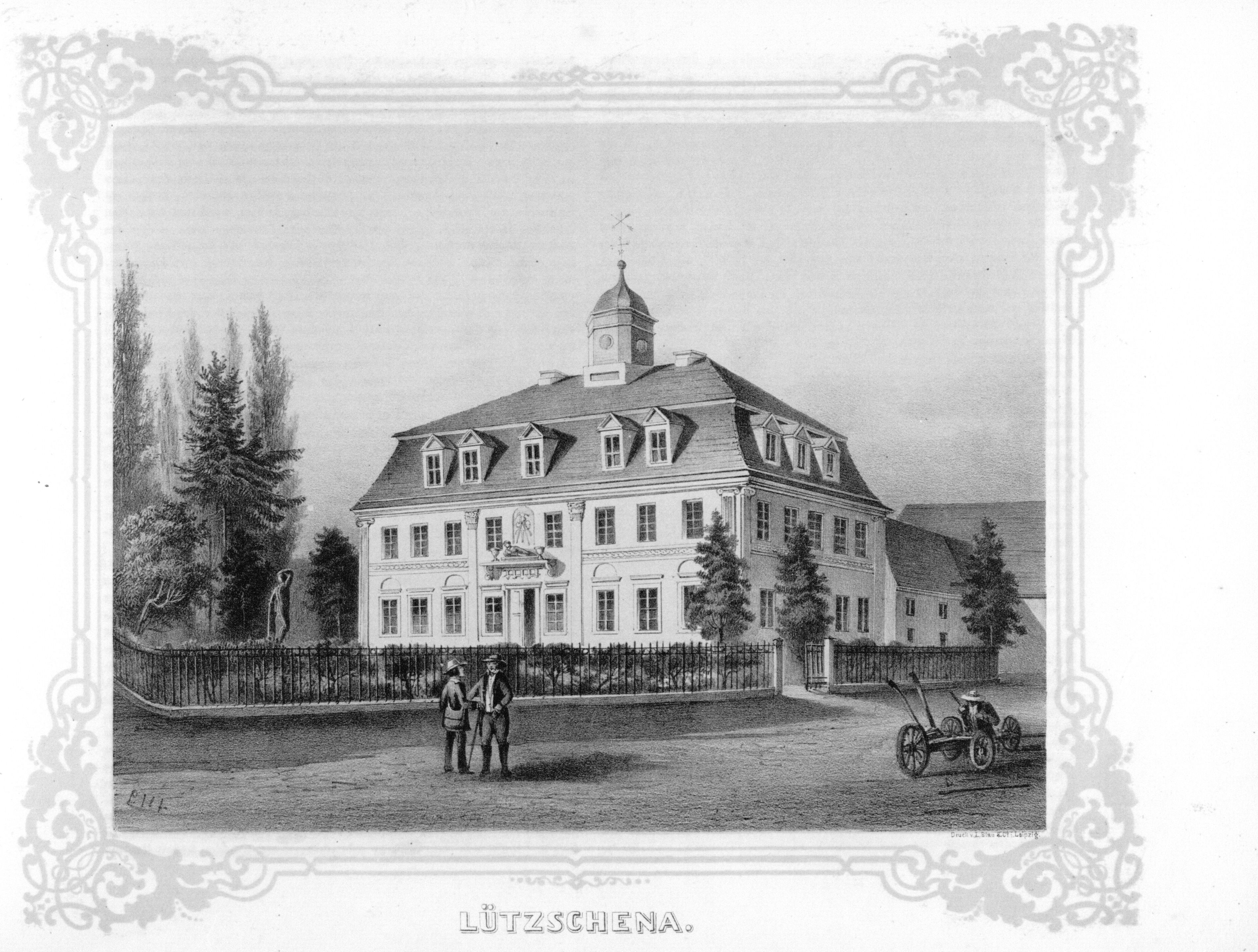
The castle during the lifetime of Speck von Sternburg

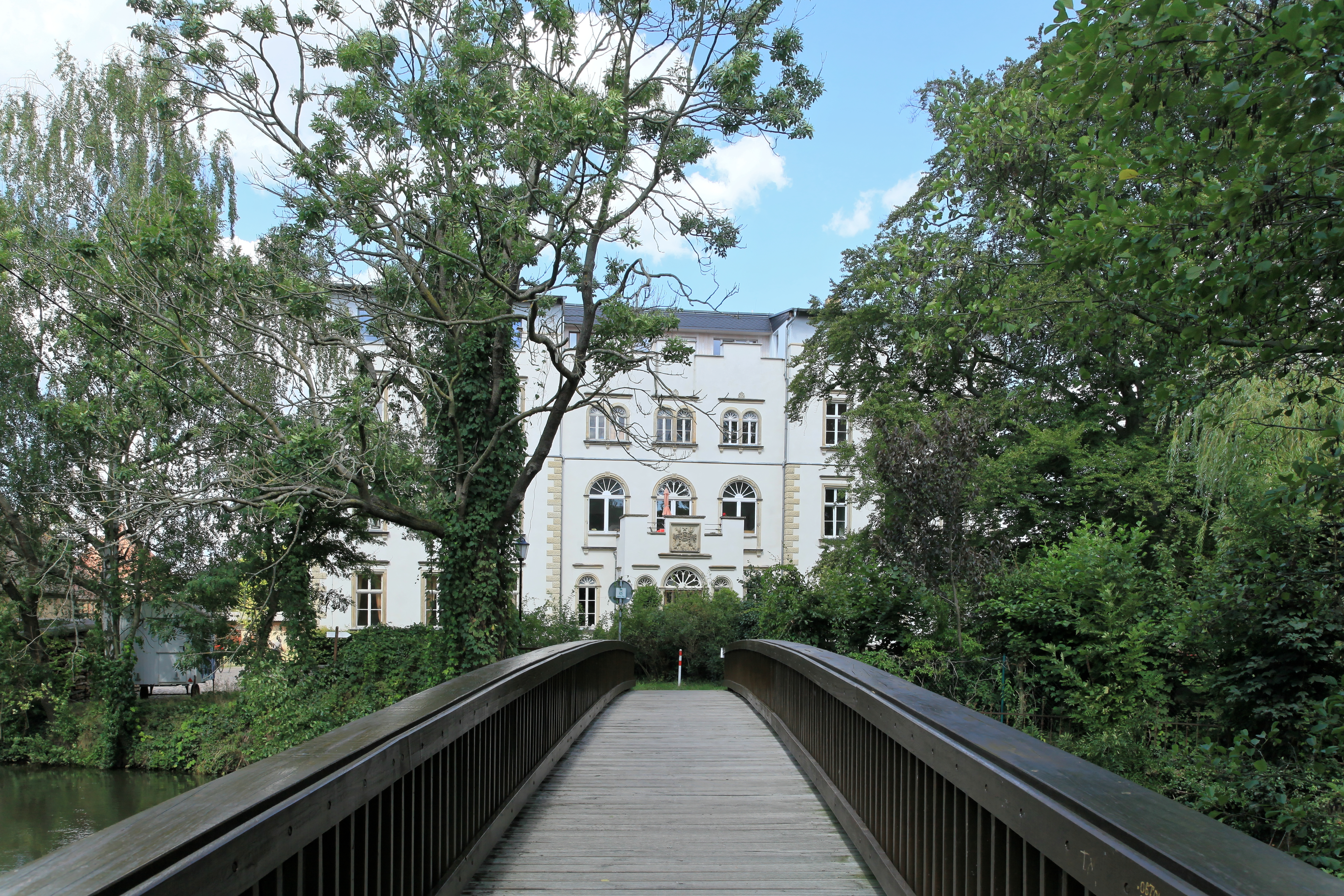
The castle today

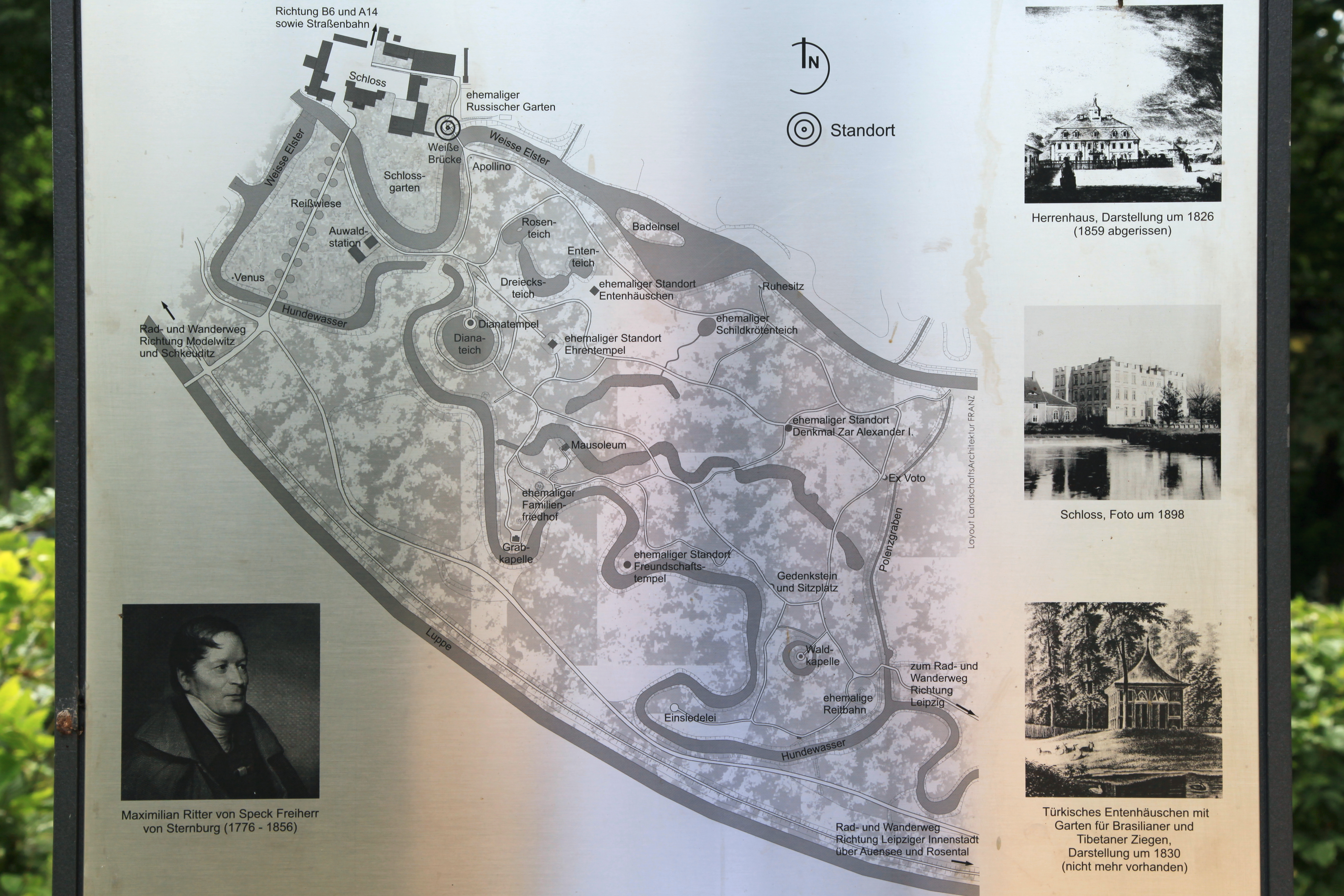
Signboard in the park
