= Tucher Brewery =

Since 1672, a brewery founded in Nuremberg, Germany

Tucher Bräu
- Interactive map of Tucher Bräu
- Type: GmbH & Co. KG
- Location: Nuremberg and Fürth, Bavaria, Germany
- Coordinates: 49°27′53″N 11°05′02″E
- Opened: 1672; 354 years ago
- Parent: Radeberger Group

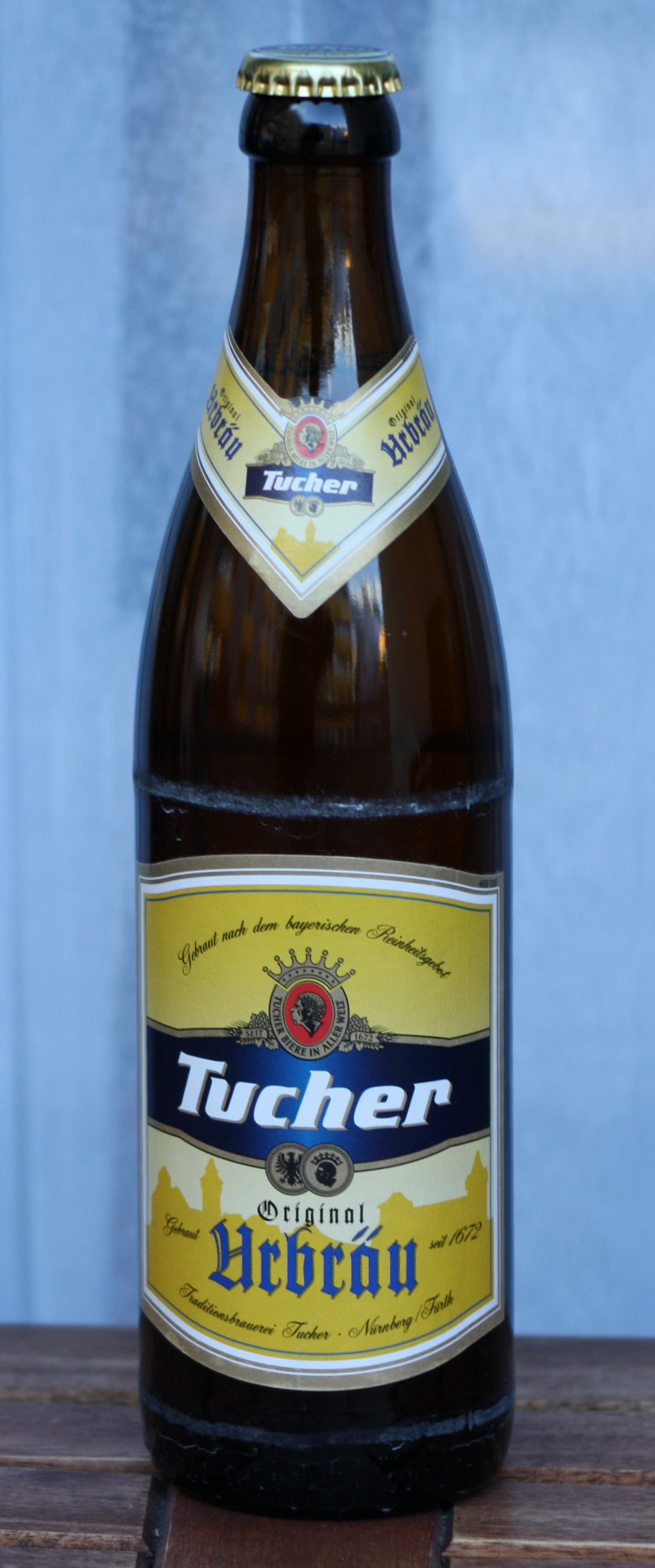
A bottle of Tucher original Helles

Tucher is a brewery and beer brand based in Fürth and Nuremberg, Germany. It was founded in Nuremberg in 1672. It is owned by the Radeberger Group, a division of the Oetker Group.

== History ==
The name comes from Freiherrlich von Tucher'sche Brauerei, which was a royal brewery of the House of Tucher von Simmelsdorf.

== Operations ==
As of September 2012, Tucher Bräu exported its products to approximately 21 countries.

As of February 2014, Kerstin Bellair was the only brewmaster at Tucher Bräu. Brewery production is monitored in a control center, and the brewery also has a high-tech laboratory for quality control and assurance testing.

== Products ==
Tucher Bräu produces lagers, several wheat beers, seasonal beers, such as a Christmas beer, and specialty beers.

== Awards ==
Tucher Bräu has received 11 gold medals from the German Agricultural Society.

== See also ==
- List of brewing companies in Germany
- List of oldest companies
