= Stuttgarter Hofbräu =

German brewery

- Type: Kommanditgesellschaft
- Location: Stuttgart, Germany
- Coordinates: 48°45′43″N 9°9′24″E
- Opened: 1872
- Owned by: Radeberger Group
- Employees: 242
- Parent: Dr. Oetker

Stuttgarter Hofbräu is a German brewery in Stuttgart, Baden-Württemberg, Germany. It was established in 1872. It is the traditional beer of the city Stuttgart and one of the three brands of beer served at Cannstatter Volksfest.

== Products ==
All products come in glass bottles and may come in different shapes, sizes, colours, and tops.

Their drinks include:

=== Pilsner ===
- Pilsner
- Herren Pils
- Export
- Alcohol free

=== Seasonal ===
- Volksfest Beer
- Frülingsfest Beer
- Christmas Beer

=== Flip-top ===
- Bügel Premium
- Kellerbier

=== Wheat beer ===
- Wheat beer

=== Käpsele ===
- Käpsele Helles

== See also ==
- List of brewing companies in Germany
