= Radeberger Group =

German brewery group

Radeberger Gruppe KG
- Interactive map of Radeberger Gruppe KG
- Type: Kommanditgesellschaft
- Location: Frankfurt am Main, Germany
- Coordinates: 50.0942°N 8.6912°E
- Opened: 1952
- Annual production volume: Approx. 13 million hl (11 million US bbl) (2015)
- Revenue: €1.9 bn
- Employees: 5,650
- Parent: Dr. Oetker KG
- Website: radeberger-gruppe.de

Radeberger Group is the largest brewery group in Germany. It is headquartered in Frankfurt am Main and produces beer (as well as near beer and other non-alcoholic beverages) at 16 different locations. With an approximate annual production volume of 13 million hectolitres, the group accounts for approximately 15% of German beer production.

== History ==
Dr. Oetker purchased Frankfurt-based Binding Brewery in 1952, which became Binding-Gruppe, the brewery and non-alcoholic beverage division. After the acquisition of Radeberger Brewery, the division was renamed Radeberger Gruppe in 2002.

== Subsidiaries ==
- Allgäuer Brauhaus AG
  - Brands: Allgäuer, Altenmünster, Büble, Oberdorfer, Teutsch Pils, Fürstabt, Norbertus
- Berliner-Kindl-Schultheiss-Brauerei, Berlin
  - Brands: Berliner Kindl, Schultheiss, Berliner Pilsner, Potsdamer Rex, Berliner Bürgerbräu, Märkischer Landmann, Prater
- Binding Brewery, Frankfurt am Main
  - Brands: Binding, Henninger, Erbacher
- Bionade GmbH, Ostheim vor der Rhön
- Dortmunder Actien Brauerei, Dortmund
  - Brands: Kronen, Union, DAB, Brinkhoff's, Hansa, Hövels, Ritter, Thier, Stifts, Wicküler, Andreas Pils, Schlösser Alt
- Freiberger Brauhaus GmbH, Freiberg
  - Brands: Freiberger, Freibergisch, Meisterbräu
- Friesisches Brauhaus zu Jever, Jever
- Hanseatische Brauerei Rostock, Rostock
  - Brands: Rostocker, Mahn & Ohlerich
- Haus Kölscher Brautradition (closed 2021, since then the beer has been brewed as a contract brew at Früh), Cologne
  - Kölsch Brands: Dom Kölsch, Gilden Kölsch, Küppers Kölsch, Peters Kölsch, Sester Kölsch, Sion Kölsch
- Krostitzer Brauerei, Krostitz
  - Brands: Ur-Krostitzer
- Sternburg-Brauerei, Leipzig
- Radeberger Exportbierbrauerei GmbH, Radeberg
- Brauerei Schlösser, Düsseldorf
  - Brands: Schlösser Alt (brewed in Dortmund since 2002)
- Stuttgarter Hofbräu AG & Co. KG, Stuttgart
  - Brands: Stuttgarter Hofbräu, Malteser Weissbier
- Tucher Bräu GmbH & Co. KG, Nürnberg/Fürth
  - Brands: Tucher, Lederer Bräu, Zirndorfer, Grüner, Humbser, Patrizier, Kloster Scheyern
