= Allgäuer Brewery =

German brewery

Allgäuer Brauhaus AG
- Interactive map of Allgäuer Brauhaus AG
- Type: Aktiengesellschaft
- Location: 87435 Kempten, Germany Beethovenstrasse 7
- Coordinates: 47°43′27″N 10°18′51.2″E
- Opened: 1394
- Website: allgaeuer-brauhaus.de

Allgäuer is a brewery belonging to the Radeberger Group, with a corporate seat and origin in Kempten (Allgäu), Germany. The company brews a wide assortment of about 20 different beers. The brewery is located in Leuterschach, a district of Marktoberdorf.

== History ==
The Allgäu Brewery is the result of fusion process in Kempten from 1888 of

- Kempten stock brewery
- Bürgerlicher Brauhaus (founded by August and Robert Weixler in 1899)
- Grünbaumbrauerei (August Schnitzer).

The Allgäu Brewery was founded by the Weixler family on 28 January 1911. In 1921 was acquired the Stiftsbrauerei Kempten, which originated in 1394 and whose tradition became the Allgäuer brewery's own. "The founders wanted to know their company as a pool of Allgäu and Swabian beer interests and they have clearly expressed it with the company name."

== Gallery ==
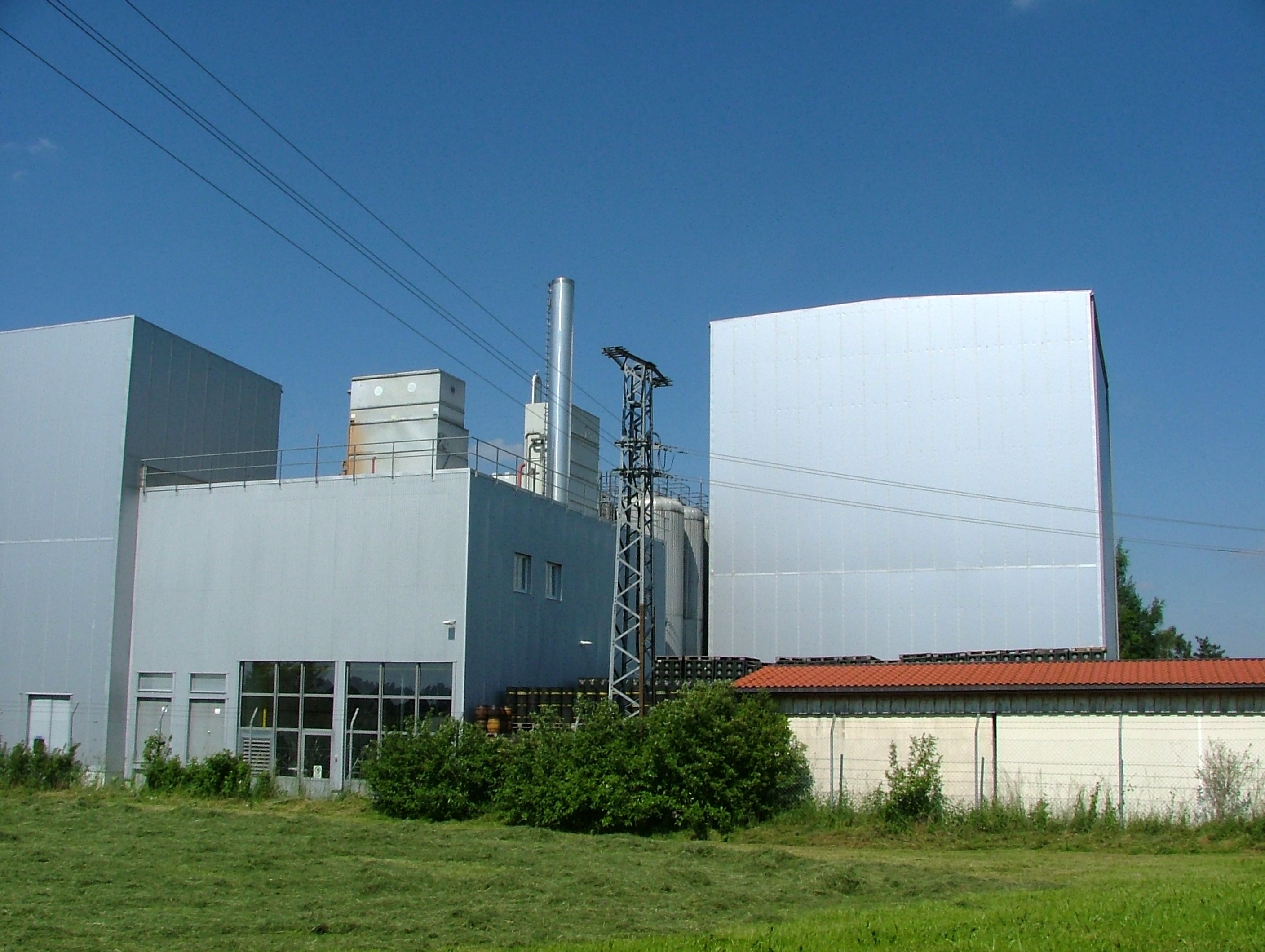
Brewery in Leuterschach

== See also ==
- List of oldest companies
