= Henninger Brewery =

German brewery

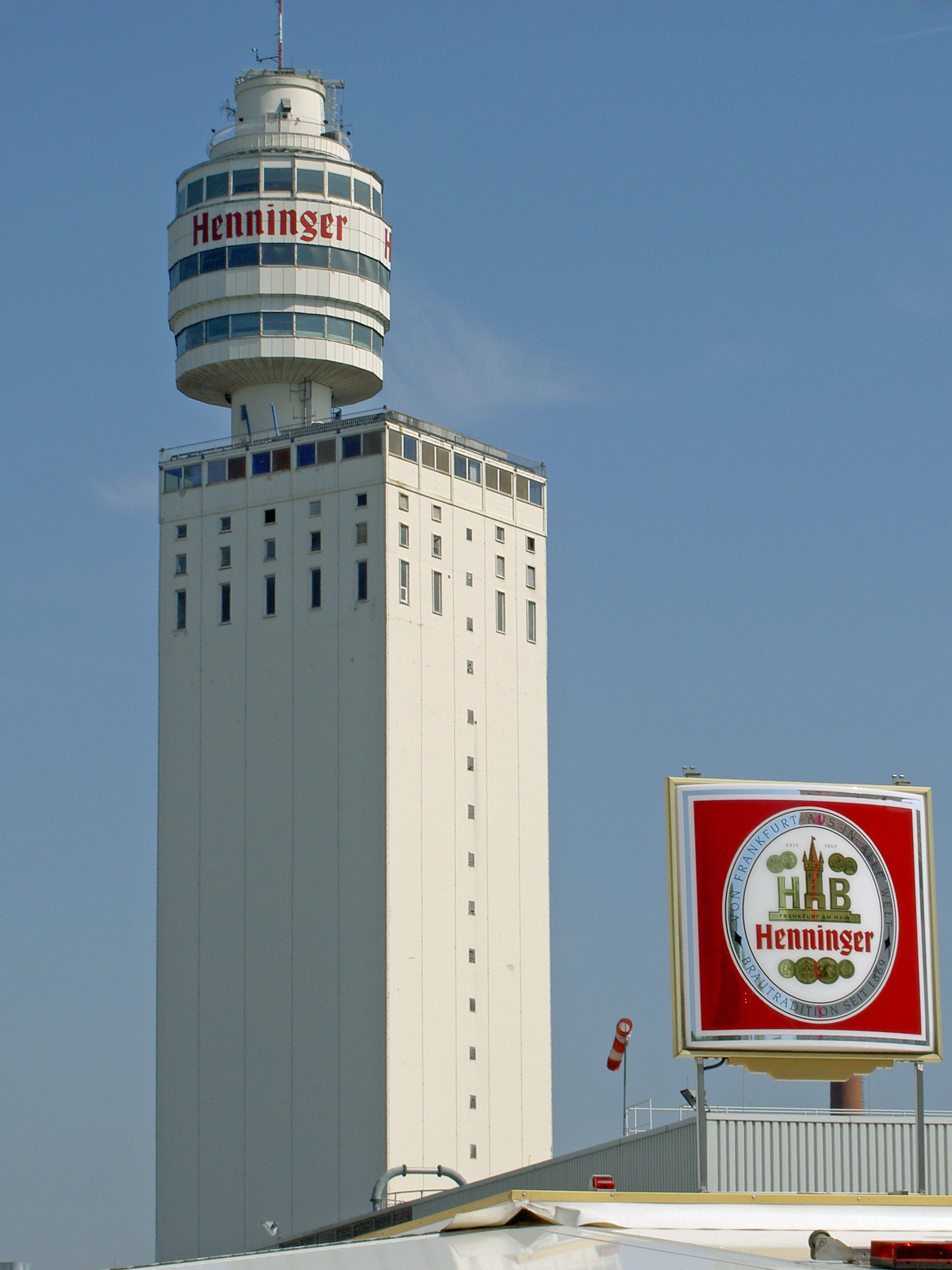
Old Henninger Tower

Henninger Brewery was a notable brewery in Frankfurt, Germany. The Henninger brewery in Frankfurt traces its roots to 1655 in Eberhard Stein's brew house. In 1873 Heinrich Christian Henninger, who came from Erlangen/Bavaria, entered the brewery. In 1881 it was transformed into a stock company and changed its name into "Frankfurter Bierbrauer-Gesellschaft - vormals Henninger und Söhne". After several expansions and acquisitions it changed its name again in 1935 to its final name Henninger-Bräu AG.

After World War II Henninger was the first German brewery to use beer cans. The company rapidly expanded and soon became one of the largest breweries in Germany. In 1966, under the aegis of majority shareholder Bruno H. Schubert, Henninger ranked number three amongst all breweries in Germany in terms of sales and expanded its reach worldwide. The company founded subsidiaries or brewed under license in countries like Argentina (Cerveceria Schneider S. A., Santa Fé), Italy, Spain (Henninger Española), Greece (Henninger Hellas S.A) and the U.S.

In 1980 tobacco and cigarette producer Reemtsma bought the brewery, but was unsuccessful in developing the brand further. In 1987 the company was sold again to meat producer Gebrüder März AG, Rosenheim. The brewery could recover again from the heavy losses during the Reemtsma era. The company re-introduced its main brand "Kaiser Pilsner Privat", which was replaced a couple of years before by the artificial brand "Christian Henninger". On May 1, 1994, to celebrate the 33rd anniversary of the prestigious road cycle race "Around the Henninger Tower", Henninger launched "Henninger Radler" (Engl. "Hennninger Cyclist"), a beer-lemonade mix, which was the first nationwide drink of its category. Still, the enormous success of the product could not save the parent company, which went bankrupt in 1996.

In 1998 the brewery, which remained intact despite the trouble with the parent company, was sold to private investors around German billionaire and software entrepreneur Dietmar Hopp, who divested the Henninger Brand and distribution rights in 2001 to local rival Binding Brauerei AG (nowadays Radeberger Group). The last brew at the old brewery site was produced on December 20, 2001, before the buildings were demolished and gave way for a modern residential development called "Stadtgärten Henninger Turm".

The Henninger Turm (engl. Henninger tower), erected in 1961 as a grain storage silo with a barrel-like top with viewing platform and a revolving restaurant was the tallest building in Frankfurt until 1974 and had been placed under protection and classified as a historical monument. It was demolished in 2013 because it was too costly and uneconomic for renovation. On its site there was a new residential tower erected, 140 m (460 ft) tall with 130 luxury apartments and externally inspired by the old Henninger tower.

The Henninger brands include the following beers:

- Kaiser Pilsner (Privat) - Pilsen type beer
- Export - Spicy, premium beer.
- Radler - Beer and lemonade mix.
- Diät-Pils - Low-carbohydrate beer.
- Highlander - Brewed with whisky malt.
