= Dortmunder Actien Brauerei =

German brewery

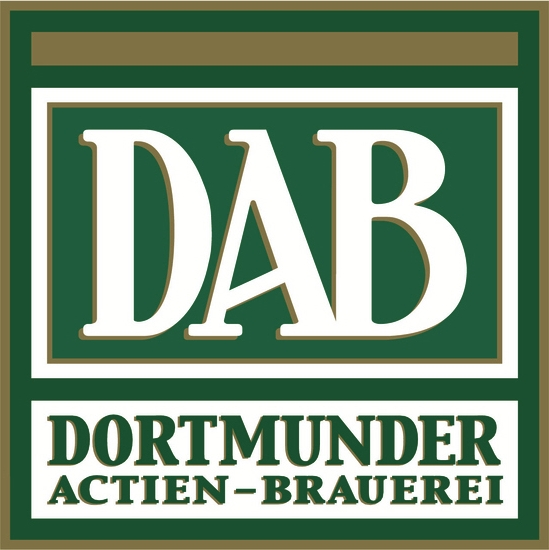
- Interactive map of Dortmunder Actien Brauerei
- Location: Dortmund, Germany
- Coordinates: 51°31′48″N 7°28′3″E
- Opened: 1868
- Owner: Radeberger Gruppe
- Parent: Dr. Oetker

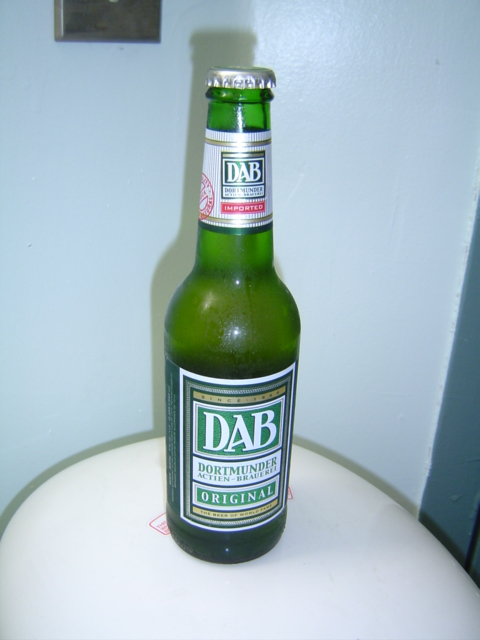
A bottle of DAB lager.

Dortmunder Actien Brauerei is a German brewery in the city of Dortmund, founded in 1868 by the businessmen Laurenz Fischer and Heinrich and Friedrich Mauritz together with master brewer Heinrich Herberz. Originally, it was called Herberz & Co Brewery (Bierbrauerei Herberz & Co.).

== History ==
Due to business steadily improving, the company expanded and went public in 1872, changing its name to "Dortmunder Actien Brauerei" (Dortmund Joint Stock Brewery).

In 1879, the company started to export its beer internationally.

In 1881, Carl von Linde himself equipped the brewery with one of his refrigeration machines, allowing for a boom of bottom-fermented beer.

In 1893, the brewery established a chemical and bacteriological laboratory.

Although World War I led to a crash in beer production, the brewery was equipped with its own railway connection in 1917. After the near-total destruction of Dortmund in World War II, the brewery was rebuilt by 1949.

From 1959 to 1963, DAB switched from the old wooden to new aluminium barrels. The Hansa Brewery, a local competitor, was acquired in 1971.

On its grounds, DAB erected a new modern brewery, finished in 1983, at the time the largest of the Ruhr area. However, the cost of the acquisition of Hansa was substantial, and burdened DAB for years to come. Questionable decisions by the company management in the 1990s exacerbated the situation, leading to a collapse of the company brands and the increasing production of generic brands to make use of the capacities.

Even the acquisition of the brand names of another local competitor in economic difficulties, the Kronen Brewery, could not stop the downward trend which to this day, even though the company is the last brewery in Dortmund, has not been fully stopped.

Most prominent stock holder today is the Radeberger Group of breweries, which in turn belongs to the company founded by August Oetker, today one of the most prominent players in the German food and drink industry.

DAB produces a lager called DAB after their initials. DAB was the favorite beer of Erich Honecker, former leader of East Germany.

== Dortmunder Hansa ==
Hansa Pils Label

The former Hansa Brewery is in the North-Central section of Dortmund. Dortmunder Actien Brauerei took over Hansa in 1971. Dortmunder Hansa refers to a number of beers, popular due in part to low price. Hansa brews a variety of beers, including Pilsener, Altbier, Malzbier, Kölsch and wheat beer. Because of its low price, Hansa Pils is often used in Radler. The low price also led to its popularity in the punk subculture in Germany.

The facility also houses the Dortmunder Brewery Museum. Before changing its name to Dortmunder Hansa, the beer was brewed in the same location, then called the Borussia Brewery.

== See also ==
- Dortmunder Export
- List of brewing companies in Germany
