= Binding Brewery =

German brewery

Binding-Brauerei
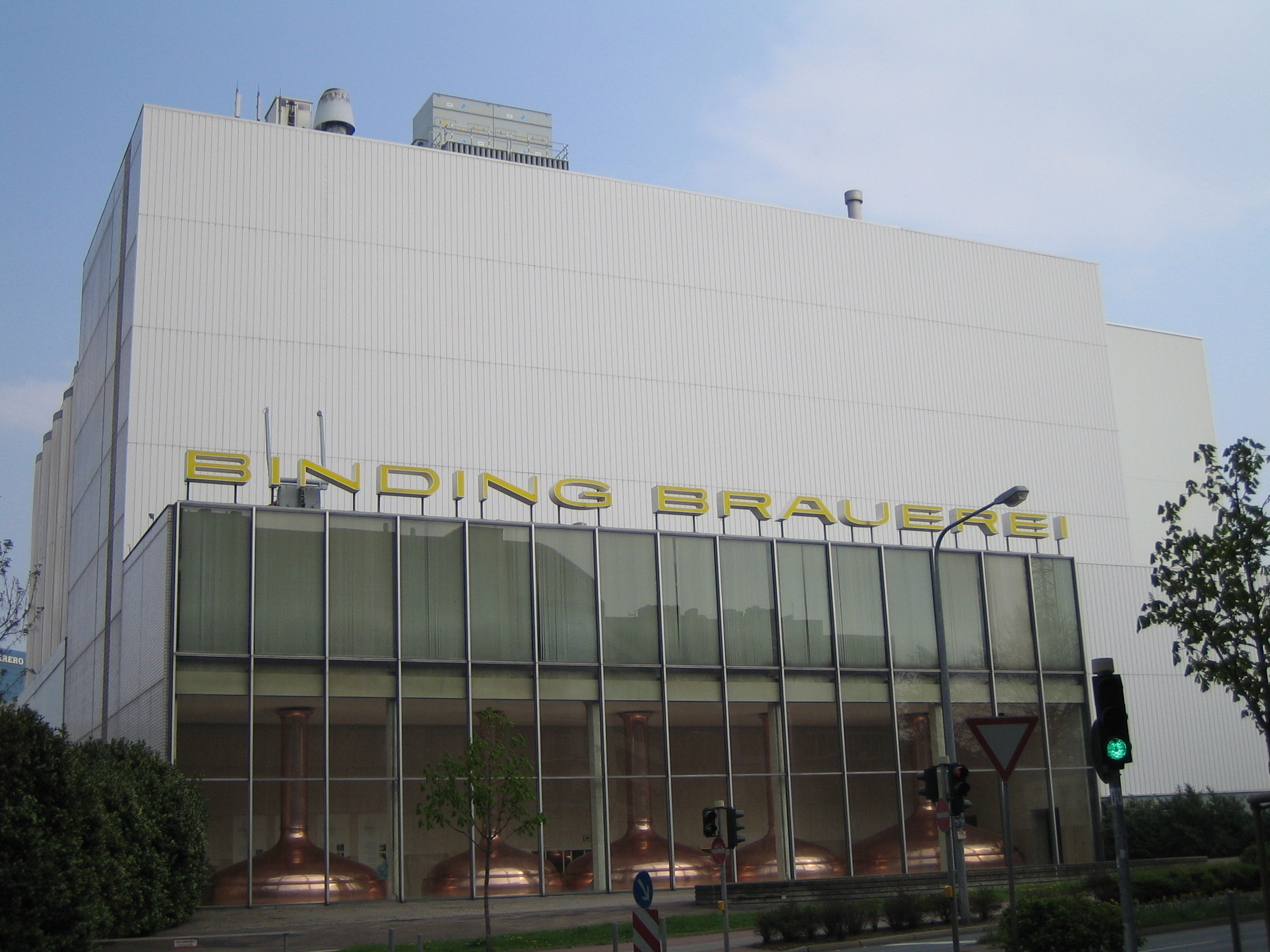
- The Binding-Brauerei in Frankfurt am Main
- Interactive map of Binding-Brauerei
- Type: Aktiengesellschaft
- Location: Frankfurt am Main, Germany
- Coordinates: 50°5′41″N 8°41′28″E
- Opened: 1870
- Owned by: Dr. Oetker
- Parent: Radeberger Gruppe

Binding-Brauerei is a brewery in Frankfurt am Main. The brewery was founded by Conrad Binding in 1870 and since 1953 is included in Dr. Oetker group. Until 2002, the Oetker Group's beverage division was called Binding-Gruppe, but is now called Radeberger Group. Binding includes labels such as Binding Adler-Pils, Clausthaler (a near beer), Henninger, and Schöfferhofer. The United States branch of the brewery is located in Norwalk, Connecticut.

During the 1960s and 1970s, Binding expanded considerably through the purchase of smaller breweries in Rhineland-Palatinate, Hesse and northern Baden. As a rule, these breweries were dropped but two of them remain as the Clausthaler and Schöfferhofer brands.

The traditional Frankfurt brewery site of Binding in Sachsenhausen will end its production by October 2023 and outsource to other locations.
