= Dortmunder Export =

Type of pale lager beer brewed since 1873

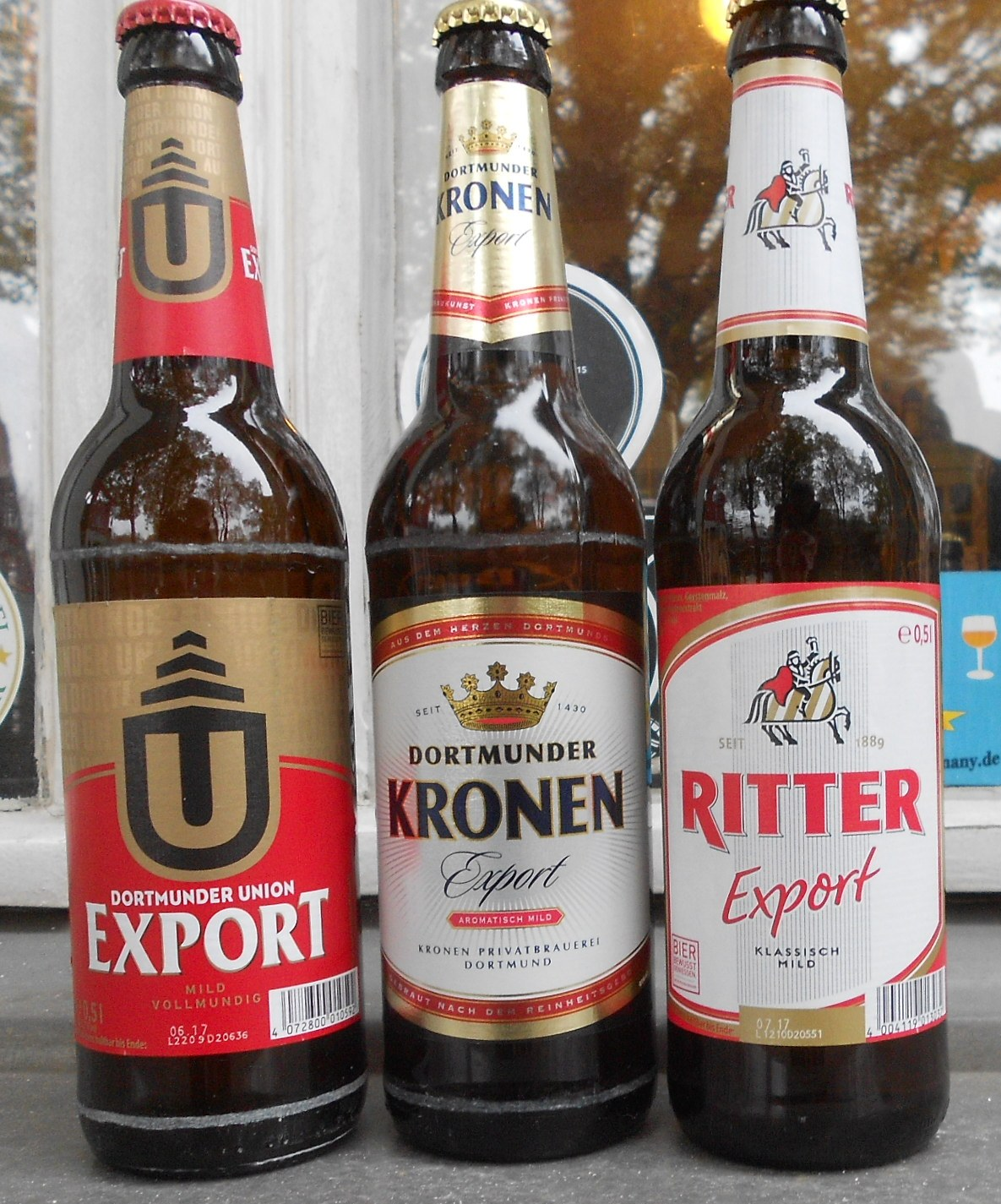
Dortmunder Export

Dortmunder Export or Dortmunder is a pale lager originally brewed by Dortmunder Union in Dortmund, Germany, in 1873. It is a soft-textured beer influenced by the Pilsner lager brewed in Plzeň.

== History ==
The original Dortmunder Export

After World War II, Export was the most popular type of beer in Germany until 1970, when it was supplanted by Pils. Its fortunes have revived a little since its low point of the late 1990s. In 2008, just under 10% of the beer sold in German shops was Export.

== Dortmund-style beers ==
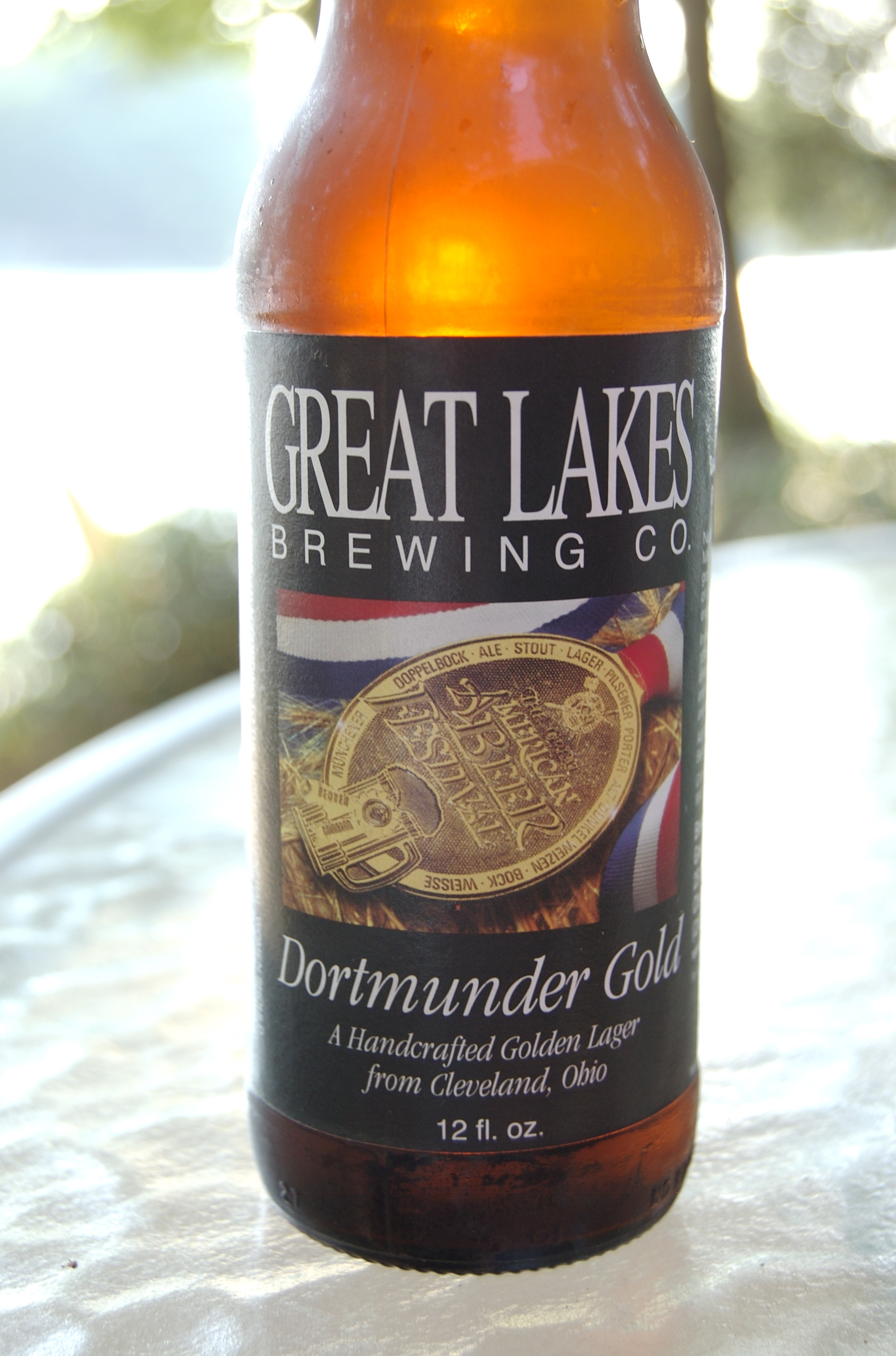
An example of a beer brewed in USA, and termed Dortmunder

Fred Eckhardt in A Treatise on Lager Beers, published in 1969, set out the view that Dortmunder is a distinctive enough pale lager to be classed as a separate beer style.

Michael Jackson and Roger Protz continued the trend, although with a certain faint heart, uneasy at pinning down exactly the distinctive nature of the beer.

Brewers outside of Germany who brew beers they term Dortmunder will tend to brew a pale lager with a soft, rounded character.

== See also ==
- Dortmunder Actien Brauerei
- German beer
- Pale lager
