= Radeberg =

Town in Saxony, Germany

- Town
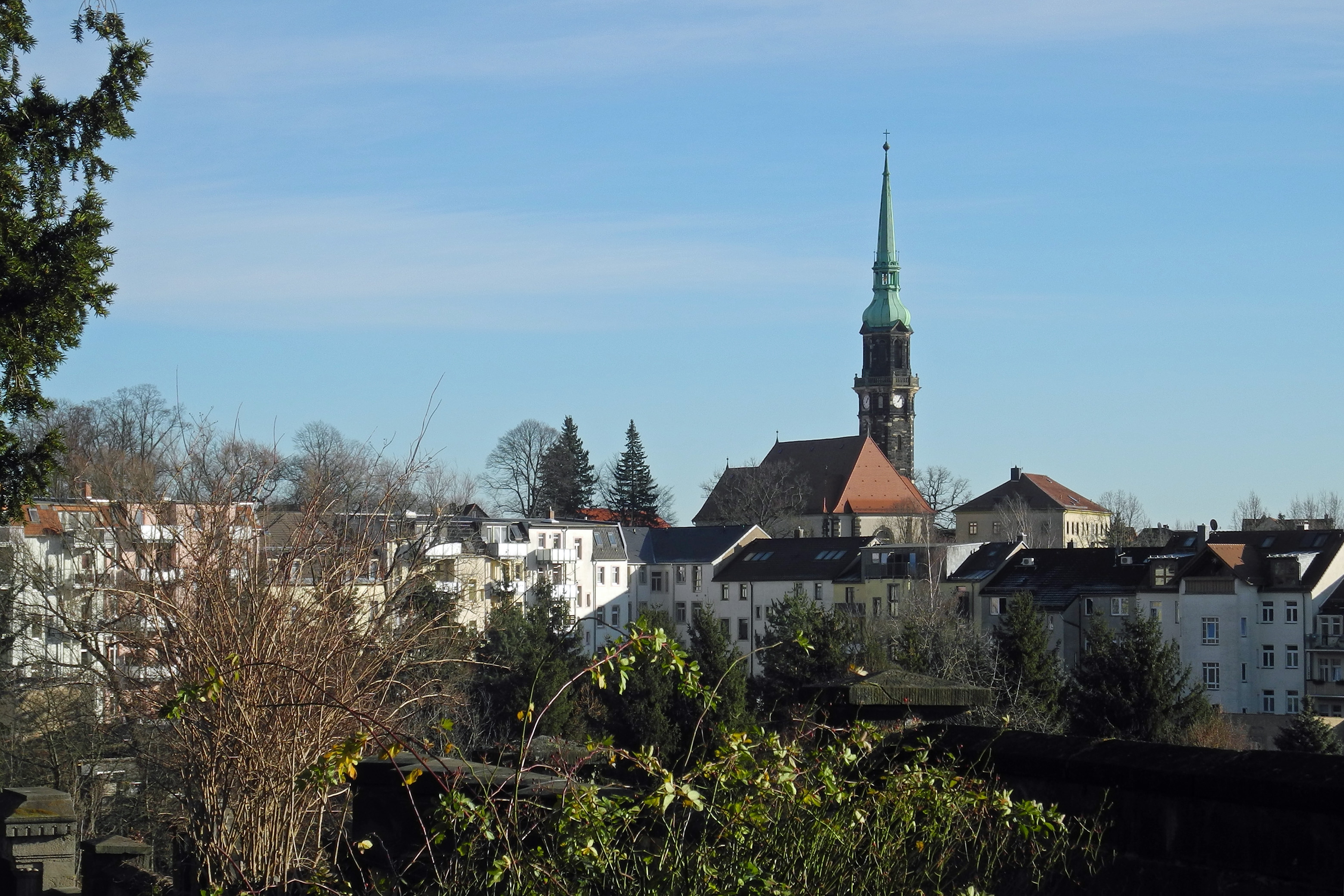
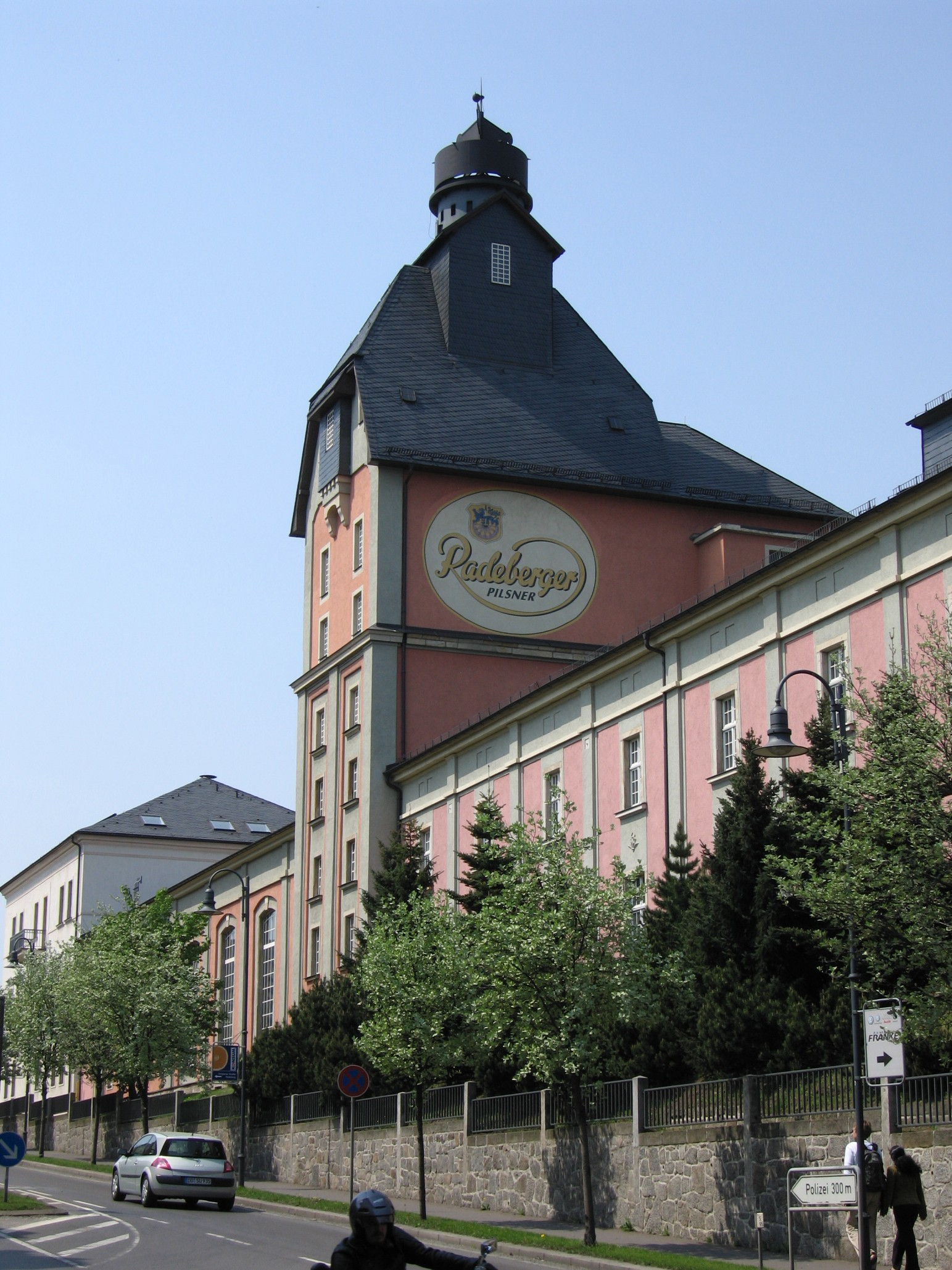
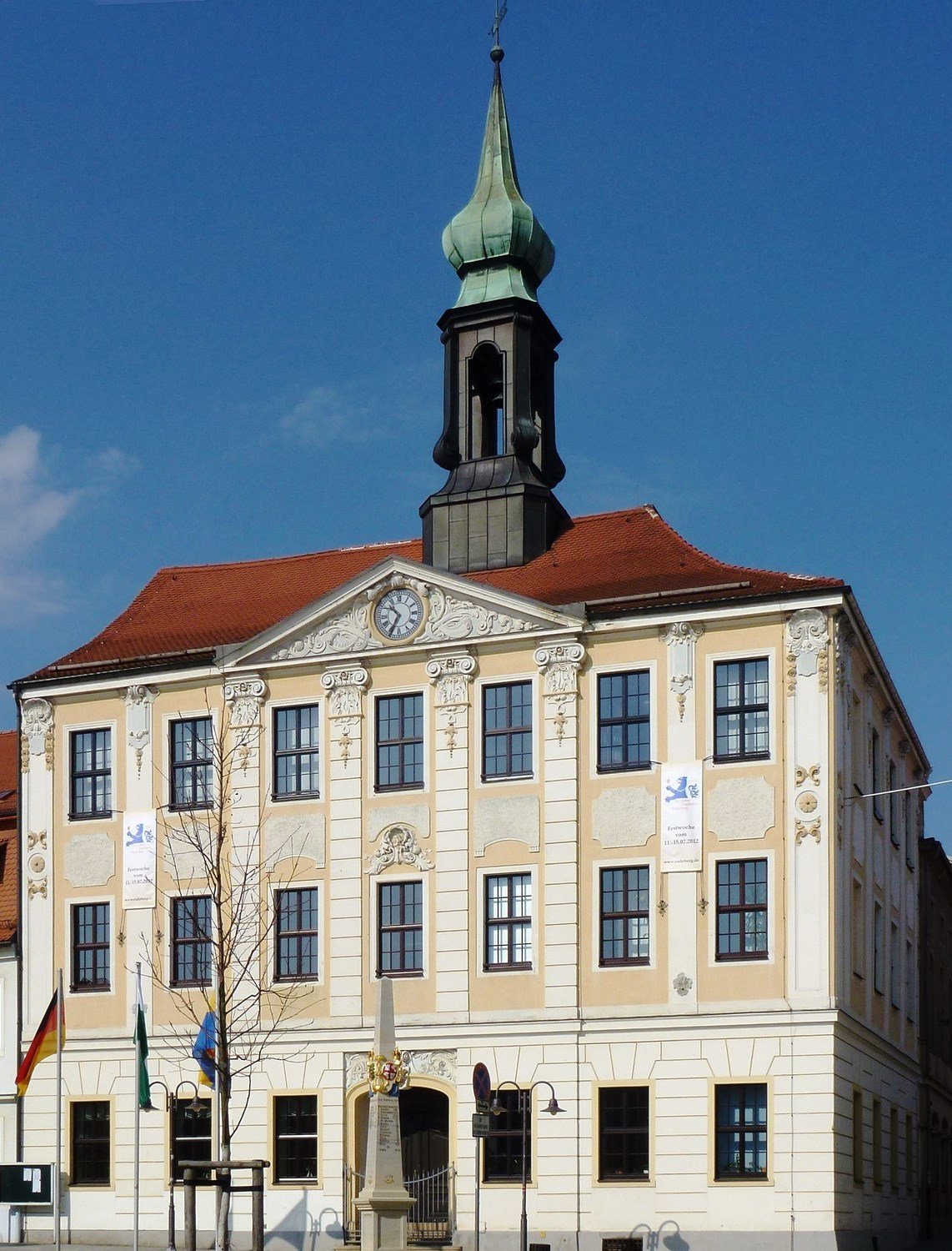
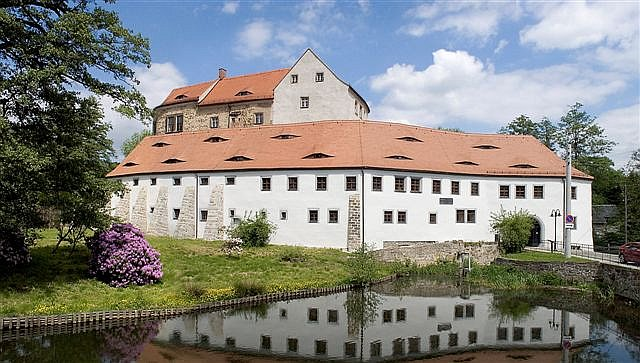
- Radeberg with church Building of Radeberger Brewery Town hall Klippenstein castle

- Coat of arms

- Location of Radeberg within Bautzen district
- Interactive map of Radeberg
- Location within Germany Location within Saxony
- Coordinates: 51°7′N 13°55′E
- Country: Germany
- State: Saxony
- District: Bautzen
- Subdivisions: 5

Government
  - Mayor (2022–29): Frank Höhme

Area
  - Total: 29.83 km^{2} (11.52 sq mi)
- Elevation: 250 m (820 ft)

Population (2025-12-31)
  - Total: 18,667
  - Density: 625.8/km^{2} (1,621/sq mi)
- Time zone: UTC+01:00 (CET)
  - Summer (DST): UTC+02:00 (CEST)
- Postal codes: 01454
- Dialling codes: 03528
- Vehicle registration: BZ, BIW, HY, KM
- Website: www.radeberg.de (in German)

Radeberg (German pronunciation: [ˈʁaːdəˌbɛʁk]) is a Große Kreisstadt ("major district town") in the district of Bautzen, Saxony, Germany. It is located approximately 20 kilometres north-east of Dresden. The town has an Evangelical and a Roman Catholic church, and an old castle.

== History ==
Radeberg was mentioned for the first time in 1219, when farmers settled on the country to the large Roeder. The name of the place is probably derived from this river. In less than 150 years a market place, a castle and own units developed. In the year 1412 the municipal law was lent to the small market town.

500 years ago silver was found close of the town. The discovery site was thereupon renamed as Silver Hill. The mine was however quickly exhausted.

A labour camp of the Reich Labour Service was operated in the town under Nazi Germany. During World War II, the Nazis operated a forced labour camp for men and women in the town. During the final stages of the war, on April 22, 1945, the Polish 1st Armoured Corps captured the town.

== Industry ==
Its principal industries are the manufacture of glass, machinery, furniture and paper, and it produces a light lager "Radeberger Beer" which is largely exported. The company Robotron Elektronik Radeberg, formerly well known in East Germany for the production of portable television sets and powerful data processing equipment, was there. The Radeberger Brewery was founded in 1872, and is part of the Oetker Group. It brews Radeberger Pilsner, a 4.8% abv pale lager.

== Transportation ==
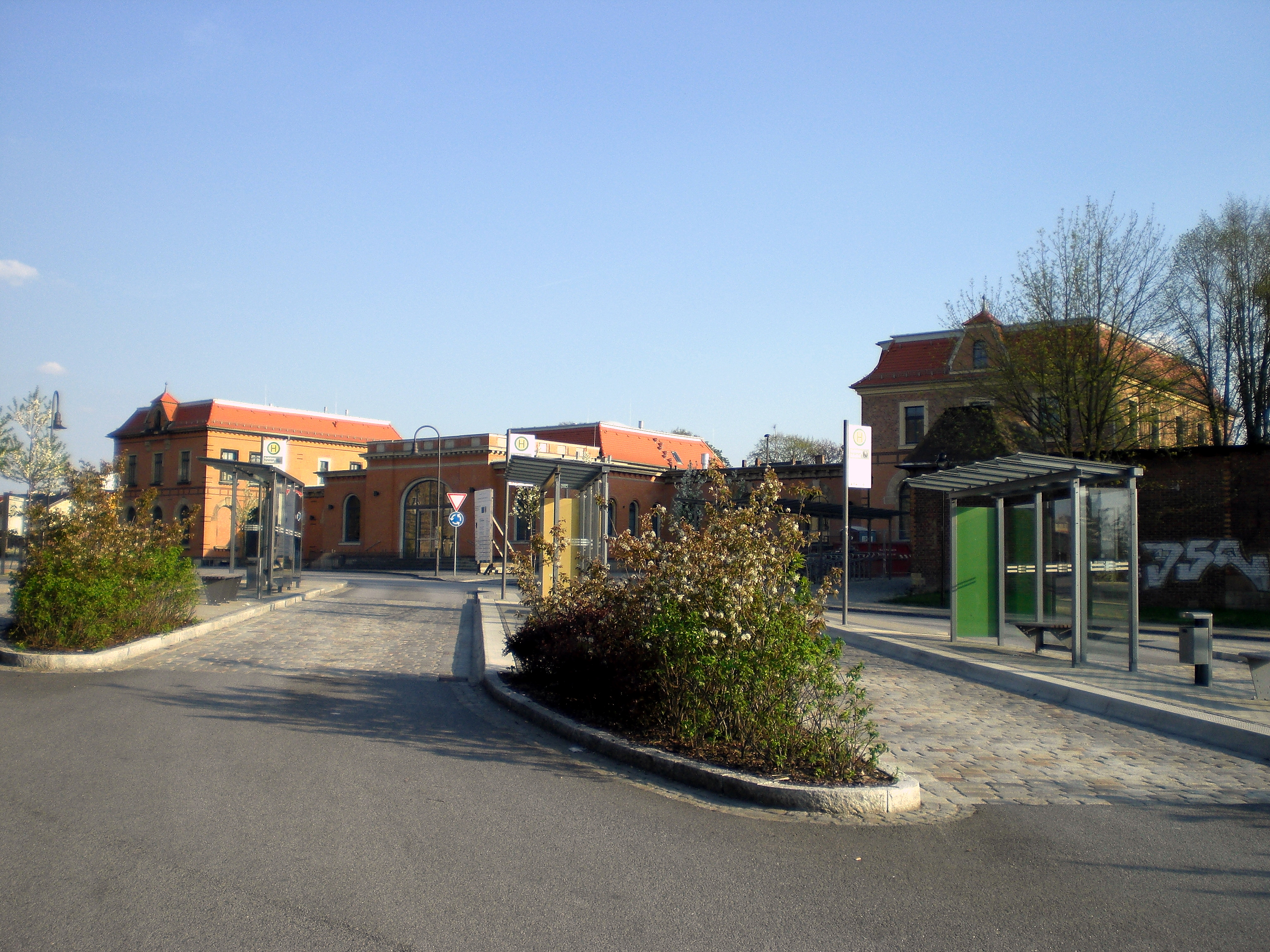
Radeberg station

The town is accessible by Radeberg railway station of Deutsche Bahn.

== Notable people ==
(Chronological order)

- Johannes Gelbke (1846–1903), German classical composer
- Theodor Arldt (1878–1960), German nature scientist, paleontologist, writer, teacher
- Georg Naumann (1901–1978), pioneering the exploration of northwest Canada / Alberta, esp. oil sands research
- Erhard Fischer (1922–1996), German music and theatre director
- Christian Leuckert (1930 - 2011), German botanist and lichenologist
- Hartmut Schade (born 1954), football player
- Thomas Scheibitz (born 1968), painter and sculptor

== See also ==
- List of cities and towns in Germany
