= Dr. Oetker =

German food manufacturer

Dr. Oetker KG

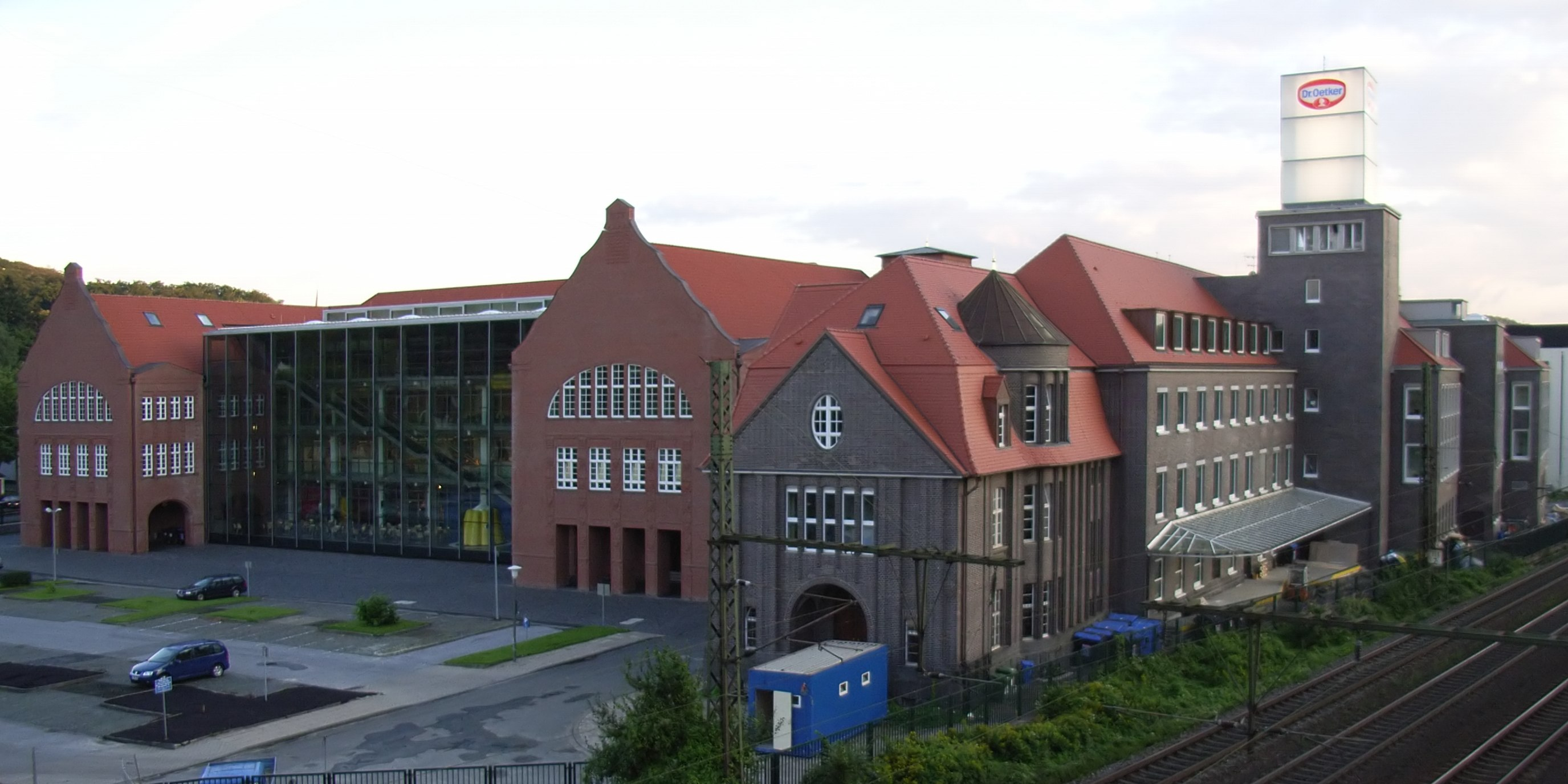
- Headquarters in Bielefeld
- Type: Limited partnership
- Industry: Food processing
- Founded: 1891; 135 years ago
- Founder: August Oetker
- Headquarters: Bielefeld, North Rhine-Westphalia, Germany
- Products: Baking powder, pudding, cake mixes, breakfast cereals, yogurts, frozen pizza
- Revenue: €4.2 billion (2023)
- Number of employees: 16,510 (2023)
- Website: oetker.com oetker-gruppe.de

Dr. Oetker (German pronunciation: [ˌdɔktoːɐ̯ ˈʔœtkɐ]) is a German multinational company that produces baking powder, cake mixes, frozen pizza, pudding, breakfast cereals, cake decoration, birthday candles, and various other products.

The company is a wholly owned branch of the Oetker Group, headquartered in Bielefeld, Germany.

== Portfolio ==
The portfolio includes more than 300 individual companies in five different businesses, among them food (including Dr. Oetker GmbH and Coppenrath & Wiese KG), breweries (Radeberger Group), sparkling wine and spirits (Henkell & Co. Sektkellerei), banking (Bankhaus Lampe), and "further interests" (among them chemicals, financing, and a number of high-class hotels in Europe).

== History ==
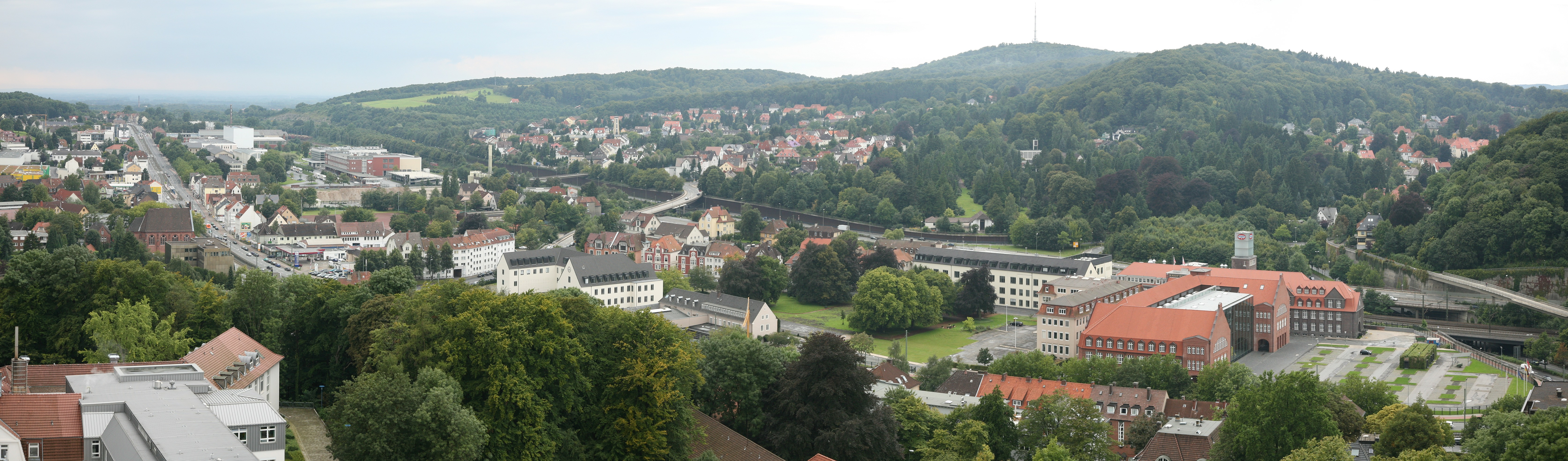
Dr. Oetker factory premises in Bielefeld, Germany

=== Formation ===
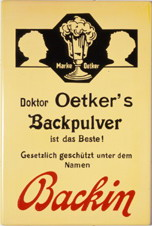
A 10-g Backin package (1902)

The company was founded by August Oetker in 1891. The first product developed was Backin, a measured amount of baking powder that, when mixed with 500 grams (18 oz) of flour and other ingredients, produced a cake.

=== First World War ===
Oetker's son Rudolf and his wife Ida had two children, Rudolf-August and Ursula. The senior Rudolf was later killed in the First World War. His widow Ida remarried Richard Kaselowsky, and they had four more children with Kaselowsky raising Rudolf-August and Ursula as his own. Kaselowsky became the manager of the company from 1920 to his death.

=== Second World War ===
During the 1930s and 1940s, Rudolf August Oetker was an active member of the Waffen-SS of the Third Reich. The company supported the war effort by providing pudding mixes and munitions to German troops. The business used slave labour in some of its facilities. A bronze bust of Richard Kaselowsky still sits within the company headquarters in Bielefeld. Kaselowsky was killed during an air raid on Bielefeld in 1944. The Oetker family is among those that have profited most from their close relations to the Nazi regime.

=== International expansion ===
Rudolf August Oetker, the grandson of August Oetker, led the company between 1944 and 1981 when it achieved its highest growth. The Oetker family's private bank also employed as a director Rudolf von Ribbentrop (1921–2019), son of Joachim von Ribbentrop and Anna Elisabeth Henkell of the Wiesbaden wine family and, like Oetker, a wartime Waffen SS officer. The company expanded its presence internationally, acquiring many companies around the world. When Rudolf Oetker stepped down from his leadership position, the fourth generation of the Oetker family took over from him. The family ownership established a management principle that prioritized the company's interests over those of the family.".

August Oetker, the great-grandson of the founder, led the company from 1981 until 2010. Under his tenure, it expanded further in all areas, including shipping, food, and brewing.

Richard Oetker, August Oetker's brother, took over as CEO in 2010.

== International presence ==
=== Australia ===
In January 2011, Dr. Oetker purchased the Australian frozen pizza business of Simplot, including the brand Papa Giuseppi's. In 2015, Dr. Oetker acquired the Queensland brand Queen Fine Foods.

=== Brazil ===
In Brazil, the company has a site in São Paulo. The company supplies powdered desserts, frozen pizza, and teas. In 2019, Dr. Oetker acquired the Brazilian baking firm Mavalerio (which also operates in Hanover County, Virginia, as Mavalerio USA) for an undisclosed sum of money.

=== Canada ===
The company has its head office and factory in Mississauga, Ontario. In 1962, Dr. Oetker entered the Canadian market as Condima Imports Ltd. In 1992, it purchased the "Shirriff" line of products, which are made at the Mississauga plant. In 2003, the Condima name was dropped and the company started using the Dr. Oetker brand. In July 2011 Dr. Oetker announced the building of its first North American factory in London, Ontario, to make frozen pizzas made from Ontario produce and ingredients that will be shipped in Canada and the US. In August 2014, McCain Foods announced the sale of its North American frozen pizza business to Dr. Oetker. Through product placement on its packaging and through employee giving, the company supports the children's charity SOS Children's Villages Canada.

=== Denmark ===
In Denmark, a wide selection is available. Baking powder, frozen pizza, pudding, and cake decorations are sold in most supermarkets. The company has an office in Glostrup.

=== Estonia ===
In Estonia, frozen pizzas are available at supermarkets.

=== Finland ===
In Finland, frozen pizzas, pudding, and cake decoration are available at supermarkets.

=== France ===
In France, frozen pizzas are available at supermarkets.

=== India ===
In India, the company operates offices in Bangalore, Mumbai and New Delhi. Dr. Oetker sauces, spreads, dessert toppings, cake mixes and salad dressings can be found in all major grocery chains.

=== Indonesia ===
In Indonesia, Dr. Oetker operates under the brand Pondan. The Indonesian division was founded in Jakarta in 1978 and then later moved to Tangerang in 1992, which continues until today. In 2000, Indonesian division of Dr. Oetker became independent and changed its name as PT Pondan Pangan Makmur Indonesia.

=== Italy ===
In Italy, Dr. Oetker operates under the brand Cameo. The Italian division was founded in Milan in 1933 as Oetker and then later moved to Desenzano del Garda, which continues until today. In 1953, the name is switched to Cammeo, a more Italian-sounding word, and was changed again in 1984 to Cameo.

=== Latvia ===
In Latvia, various Dr. Oetker products are available, such as frozen pizzas, baking powders and dessert powders.

=== Lithuania ===
Many Dr. Oetker products are available, including frozen pizzas, baking powder, and gelatin, the latter in both unflavoured and dessert forms.

=== Malaysia ===
In Malaysia, Dr. Oetker was currently operated after the acquisition of Nona Foods. The previous ownership of Nona Foods was Toro Food Industries. Previously, Dr. Oetker was represented in Malaysia by Kart Food Industries, between 1998 and 2002, when the company was sold to Amtek Berhad.

Following the acquisition of Nona Foods, the local subsidiary of Dr. Oetker produces jelly mixes and seasoning flour, in addition to pizzas and baking preparations.

=== Namibia ===
In Namibia, frozen pizzas are available at supermarkets.

=== Netherlands ===
In the Netherlands, frozen pizza, cake mixes, powdered desserts but also desserts like Wolkentoetje (pudding cups) can be found in all major grocery chains.

=== New Zealand ===
As with the purchase of Simplot Australia's frozen pizza business (see above), Dr. Oetker has been able to move into the New Zealand market.

=== Norway ===
In Norway, Dr. Oetker is the second-largest seller of frozen pizza with a market share of 16.5%. They also sell a range of baking powder and cake decorations.

=== Poland ===
In Poland, frozen pizzas, cake decorations, recipes with dry ingredients (the most popular one is "Kopiec kreta" with its own variations) and various powders themselves are available at markets and supermarkets. Dr. Oetker Polska was registered on April 2, 2001, but earlier, Richard Kaselovsky made a branch of the company in 1922 in Gdańsk, Oliva.

=== Portugal ===
In Portugal, frozen pizzas and some other Dr. Oetker products are available at supermarkets and some small stores.

=== Romania ===
The company has been present in Romania since 1998, when it took over Regal Corporation. Four years later, it opened a production line near Curtea de Argeș, where the majority of the products sold in Romania are produced. In 2007 Dr. Oetker acquired the local brand Inedit (food soy products), in 2009 the local brand Adazia (food ingredients, food spices and egg-colour), in 2015 the local brand Alex (food ingredients, egg-colour, spices) and in 2016 the local brand Morarita (frozen pastry).

In 2018, Dr. Oetker was one of the biggest suppliers in the food market in Romania (top 100).

=== Slovakia ===
In 1993, the company purchased a local factory Slovamyl in Boleráz, and took over its local brands Zlatý klas and BB puding. In March 2023, Dr. Oetker announced they will close the factory by mid-2023.

=== Spain ===
In Spain, frozen pizzas are available at supermarkets.

=== South Africa ===
In South Africa, frozen pizza products in many variants, frozen creamed spinach and other ready to eat frozen meals are available at supermarkets.

=== Sweden ===
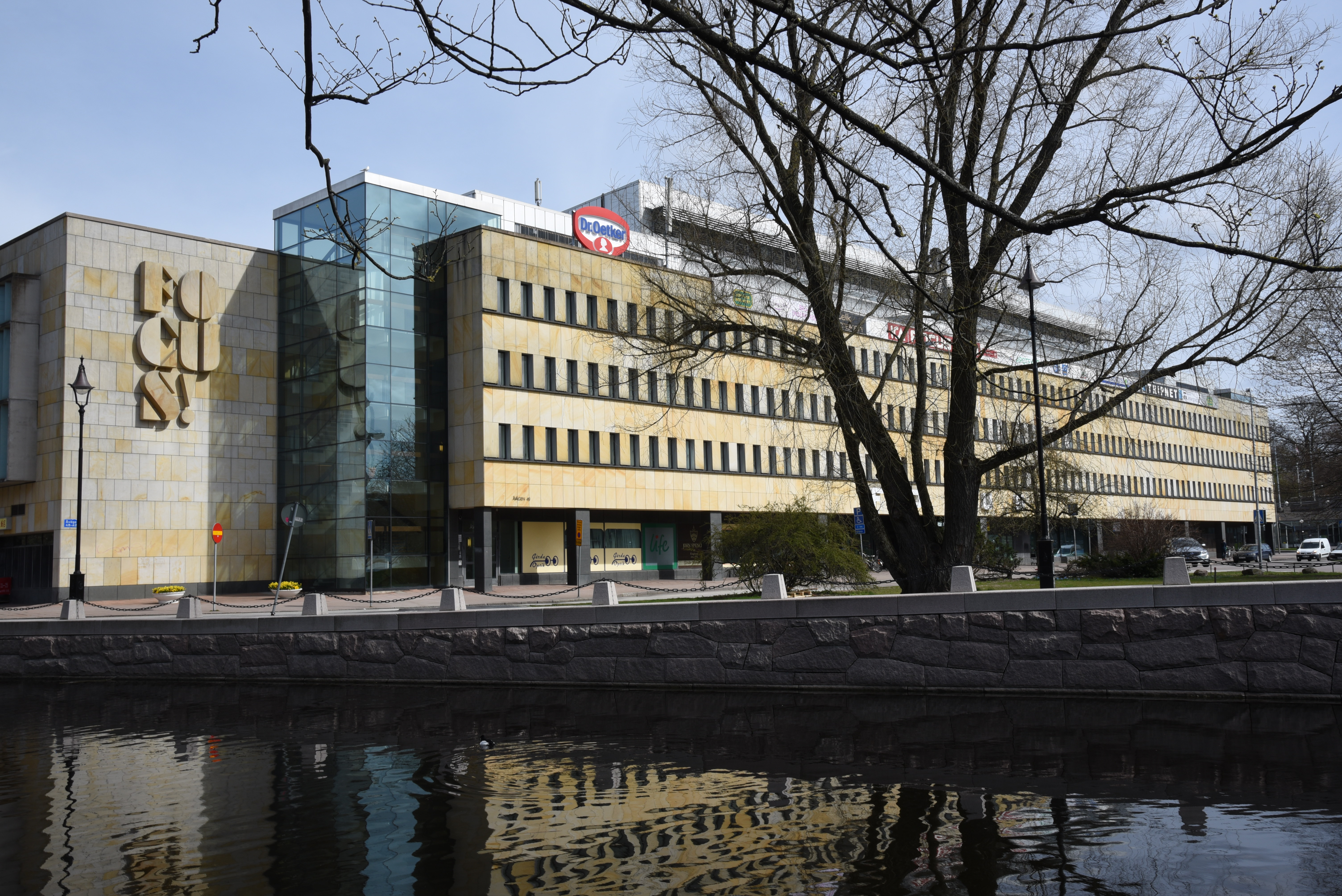
Dr Oetker's offices in Gothenburg

In Sweden, Dr Oetker's baking soda, gelatin, and other baking items, as well as frozen pizza products, are available at supermarkets. The company has an office in Gothenburg.

=== Tunisia ===
Dr. Oetker acquired a majority stake in the Tunisian food company GIAS under the "Vanoise" brand in 2012. Dr. Oetker owns a production facility, producing goods, such as baking ingredients, powder desserts and cake mixes for Tunisian market and exports to more than 15 African countries.

=== Turkey ===
In 1987 Dr. Oetker founded a production facility in Pancar-Torbali, Izmir, producing goods such as frozen pizza, baking powder and cake mixes primarily for the Turkish market. The facility was relocated to Pancar in 2009, but the company maintains operations in Izmir.

=== Ukraine ===
Dr. Oetker is incorporated in Ukraine under the Limited Liability Corporation "Dr. Oetker" and has been operating in Ukraine since 2003.

=== United Kingdom ===
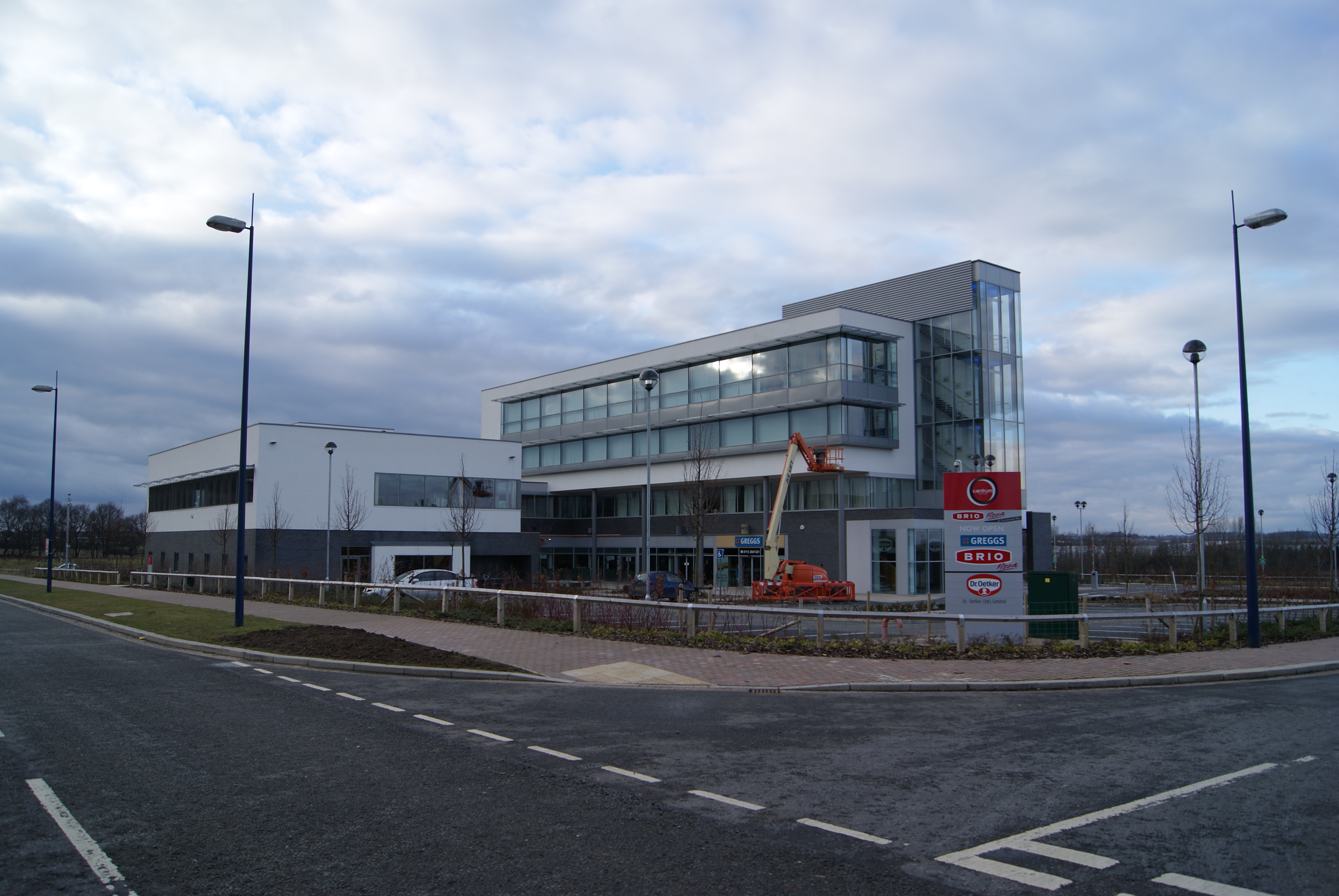
Dr Oetker's offices in Leeds

In the United Kingdom, the company has sites in Leeds and Leyland. They were a supplier of yogurt in the UK under the Onken brand name, which they no longer own. The company currently supplies frozen pizza, mostly under the Chicago Town and Ristorante brands. In 2007, Dr Oetker acquired the SuperCook range of cake ingredients and partially prepared cake mixes. This operation was expanded in 2017 with a new bake in the box cake mix range.

=== United States ===
In August 2014, McCain Foods announced the sale of its North American frozen pizza business, including Ellio's Pizza, to Dr. Oetker. In 2018, Dr. Oetker acquired the cake decorating and baking company Wilton. Wilton was founded in 1929 and was acquired by TowerBrook Capital Partners in 2009.

== Radeberger Group ==
Radeberger Group contains the breweries of the Oetker group. Radeberger is Germany's biggest group of breweries and has a market share of about 14–15%. Fifteen German breweries are part of the Radeberger Group. The major national brands are Radeberger Pils (brewed in Radeberg near Dresden), Jever Pils (brewed in Jever); Clausthaler, an alcohol-free beer, and Schöfferhofer Weizen. Regional brands are Binding (brewed in Frankfurt), Schultheiss (Berlin), Sternburg (Leipzig), Brinkhoff's (Dortmund), Freiberger (Saxony), Tucher (Fürth) and various Kölsch brands.

== Exit from the Russian market ==
On 8 April 2022, Dr. Oetker Group issued a press release in which it officially announced its complete withdrawal from the Russian market. The company stated that it was suspending all investment and marketing activities due to Russia's armed aggression against Ukraine. Also, Dr. Oetker is selling all shares and rights to a new plant that was built in Belgorod, Russia, shortly before the war started to Russian managing directors. "Dr. Oetker strongly condemns the Russian invasion of Ukraine and calls on the Russian government to immediately end the war and restore peace." the company said in a statement.

== Hotels ==
The company operates 10 hotels under the brand Oetker Collection. The portfolio is currently:

- L'Apogée Courchevel in Courchevel, France — situated in the French Alps.
- Brenners Park-Hotel & Spa in Baden-Baden, Germany.
- Hôtel Le Bristol Paris, France — located on the Rue Faubourg-St. Honore.
- Château Saint-Martin & Spa in Vence, France — between Nice and Antibes.
- Hôtel du Cap, Antibes, France — a hotel in Cap d'Antibes, on the French Riviera.
- Eden Rock St Barths in Saint Barthélemy.
- Lanesborough Hotel in Knightsbridge, central London, England.
- Palácio Tangará in São Paulo, Brazil.
- Jumby Bay Island in Antigua

== See also ==
- List of frozen food brands
