= Georges Kugelmann =

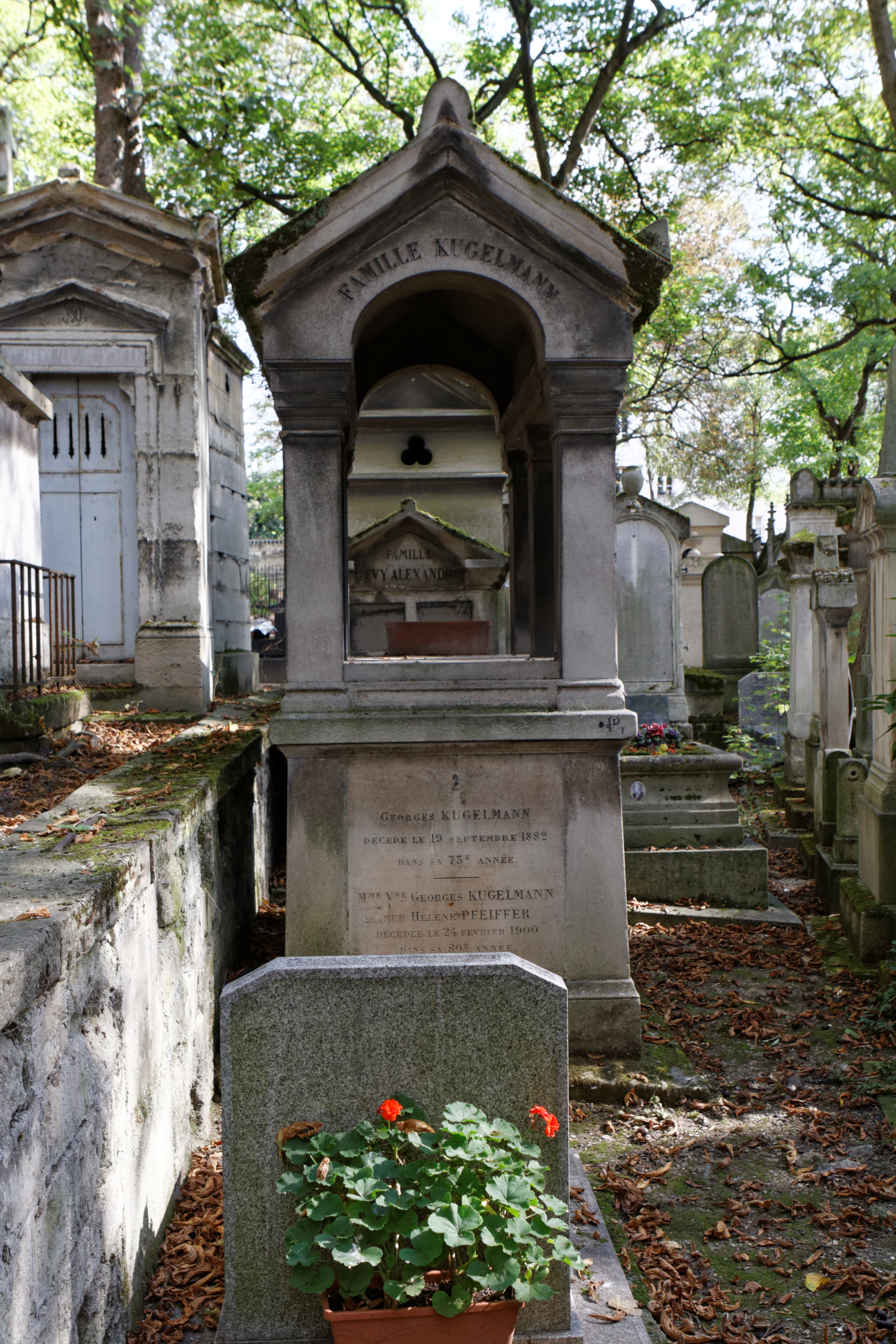
Tomb of Kugelmann

Georges Kugelmann (1809–1882) is a French printer of German Jewish origin. He was born in Kassel, in Hesse.

Kugelmann served his apprenticeship as a compositor in his hometown before leaving for Paris, where he was employed in the office of Ambroise Firmin Didot (1790–1876). He tried out publishing for a few years in the early 1840s, but P. Boizard quickly took over his operations.

In 1843, Kugelmann married Helena Pfeiffer (1821–1900), born in Stuttgart, a year before they welcomed their son Joseph (1844–1902).

To be able to set up as a printer as a foreigner, Kugelmann entered into a partnership with Mr. d'Aubusson who had a printer's license. They established a small print shop in the Passage des Panoramas and later at rue Feydeau in the 2nd arrondissement in Paris. d'Aubusson eventually died, so Kugelmann applied to be naturalized as a French citizen to be able to apply for his own printer's license.

Kugelmann's business focused on printing periodicals. He had set up shop on rue du Helder, but his neighbours sued because the noise from the printing presses was keeping them awake. He finally established his business at 12, rue de la Grange Batelière in the 9th arrondissement. He printed dailies and weeklies, including Le Figaro when it was edited by Hippolyte de Villemessant (1810–1879),, Henry de Pène (1830–1888)'s Gazette des étrangers and, later, Edmond Tarbé (1830–1888)'s Le Gaulois. He is said to have taught Honoré de Balzac how to correct his proofs.

Joseph Kugelmann carried on his father's business after the latter's death. The Kugelmann family is buried at Père Lachaise Cemetery, in Paris. Resting together are Georges, Helena, and Joseph, as well as the latter's wife Aline née Benda (1857–1936) and their son, painter and stage designer Georges Kugelmann Benda (1883–1954).
