= Brightshore Capital =

Real estate investment firm

- Logo used from 2026
- Formerly: GTIS Partners
- Type: Private
- Industry: Real Estate
- Founded: 2005
- Founder: Tom Shapiro
- Headquarters: New York, United States
- Area served: United States; Brazil
- Key people: Tom Shapiro; Rob Vahradian; Tom Feldstein; Joao Teixeira; Ed McDowell; Robert McCall; Peter Ciganik; Maristella Val Diniz
- Services: Real Estate Investment, Development, Asset Management, Private Equity
- AUM: $5.6 billion
- Website: brightshore.com

Brightshore Capital is a real estate investment firm founded by Tom Shapiro in 2005. The company specializes in the acquisition, development, and management of real estate assets.

As of 2026, the company operates in the United States and Brazil.

== History ==
The company was founded in 2005 as GTIS Partners by Tom Shapiro, who previously worked at Tishman Speyer. In 2026, the firm has changed its name to Brightshore Capital and had $5.6 billion of gross assets under management.

As of September 2025, Brightshore has made 236 investments totaling US$16 billion across 50 major markets in the United States.

== Investment Strategy ==
Brightshore is headquartered in New York City and has offices in San Francisco and Los Angeles, California, Atlanta, Georgia, Charlotte, North Carolina, Phoenix, Arizona, Dallas and Houston, São Paulo, Brazil, and Munich, Germany.

Following the financial crisis in 2008, Brightshore returned with an investment focus on residential real estate and opportunistically began to acquire condominiums, land and homebuilding assets, and single-family rental homes across the US. It acquired thousands of single-family homes and rented them out in markets across the United States, and ultimately exited those investments in 2021. The firm shifted its focus toward developing newly constructed “built-to-rent” homes built specifically for rental use, citing the growing demand for high-quality rental housing. The firm has also been active in buying land and buildings for warehouse use and holds properties near the Phoenix Goodyear Airport, Dallas Fort Worth Airport, Houston, Nashville, and Charlotte.

=== Projects in the United States ===
==== Qualified Opportunity Zones investment ====
Since 2021, Brightshore Capital has invested in the development of underserved communities through Qualified Opportunity Zone (QOZ) funds and tax incentives, a strategy officially outlined by the company's head of capital markets. In 2022, the firm raised $630 million in capital to close its initial funding round, and Fund II officially launched shortly after on July 1. In total, the firm has invested over $1.5 billion in opportunity zones to date into a range of sectors, including residential, commercial, and industrial developments. According to the company statement, the new 2.0 framework is set to take effect in 2027.

==== Viceroy and Baccarat Residences, Miami ====
Brightshore collaborated with Related Group to purchase a 4-acre site in Brickell, Miami, Florida. The two firms broke ground on the 420 unit Viceroy Residences and 355 unit Baccarat Residences projects in 2023 and 2024 respectively. The projects together represent over $1.6 billion in total sellout. Related and Brightshore secured a $328 million loan from Bank OZK to fund the Baccarat Residences project and a $164 million loan from Truist Bank to fund the Viceroy Residences project.

==== Hovnanian Homebuilding Joint Ventures ====
As of May 2024, the firm made additional investments into a joint venture portfolio with Hovnanian Enterprises Inc. for 12,600 homes valued at $6 billion across the United States. To date, the partners have invested in approximately 70 homebuilding communities. The joint venture began in 2010.

In April 2026, GTIS-Hovnanian closed another $200 million joint homebuilding plan for new residential construction in five U.S. states. According to the company statement, the total home value of the GTIS-Hovnanian portfolio was estimated at $8 billion at that point.

==== Tavalo Build-to-rent projects ====
In April 2023, the company launched Tavalo, a dedicated build-to-rent community development subsidiary. Tavalo had already completed its first build-to-rent community in December 2020 in the Phoenix suburb of Mesa, Arizona called Tavalo Cadence.

From September 2022 to July 2023, Brightshore built the Tavalo Tradition, a build-to-rent townhome community in Port St. Lucie, Florida. In May 2024, the firm launched the Tavalo Queen Creek Commons project in metro Phoenix. Its build-to-rent portfolio in the Phoenix metro area exceeds 1,100 units and is part of 19 investment portfolio in metro Phoenix by the firm, including build-to-rent communities, for-sale homebuilding communities and industrial investments.

==== CalSTRS Residential Housing Joint Venture ====
In December 2017, the firm began a partnership with the California State Teachers Retirement System (CalSTRS) to invest in homebuilding and residential land subdivisions and masterplan communities across the United States. The partnership has an opportunistic investment strategy. The investment increased by another $200m in 2020, and most recently was reported to have $750 million in commitments.

=== Projects in Brazil ===
==== Infinity Tower ====
Brightshore developed the tower which began operations in 2012. In May 2022, the company sold its 62% stake in the São Paulo office building Infinity Tower, marking the largest single asset property sale in Brazil. With a strategic location in the Faria Lima region in São Paulo, 233,500 square feet of the 376,700 square foot property was sold by the company for $172 million.

==== Palácio Tangará ====
In 2013, Brightshore purchased the site that subsequently became the location of Palácio Tangará, a hotel located in Burle Marx Park in São Paulo, overlooking a 26-acre stretch of rainforest. The company developed the property and the hotel was opened to the public in 2017 as a 5-star luxury resort, part of the Oetker Hotels.

==== BHG ====
In 2015, it acquired Brazil Hospitality Group (BHG), Brazil's largest hotel operator. At the time of the acquisition, BHG owned and operated 52 hotels with 10,000 rooms in oceanfront areas of São Paulo and Rio de Janeiro.

==== FII ====
In 2021, Brightshore launched its first Brazil-listed real estate investment trust (REIT), the GTIS Brazil Logistics Real Estate Investment Fund, with the acquisition of $248 million in logistics assets in São Paulo's metropolitan area. The acquisition, structured through the creation of a Brazilian REIT called Fundos de Investimento Imobiliário (FII), included equity investment of $130 million and $118 million in real estate receivables certificates.

==== DCC ====
In 2022, Brightshore developed and delivered the Distribution Center Cajamar (DCC), a logistics facility with 1.5 million square feet of leasable area, located in Cajamar, São Paulo. The center comprises modular warehouses available for rent and includes a rooftop solar farm with a 2.5-megawatt capacity.

==== Campus JK ====
In February 2026, the firm was developing Campus JK, a commercial development of three office buildings spanning more than 100,000 square meters, located on Avenida Presidente Juscelino Kubitschek in São Paulo. Santander Brazil is projected to move its headquarters to the location and occupy the entire development in the second half of 2028.
