= Hôtel Le Bristol Paris =

Luxury hotel in Paris

Le Bristol Paris
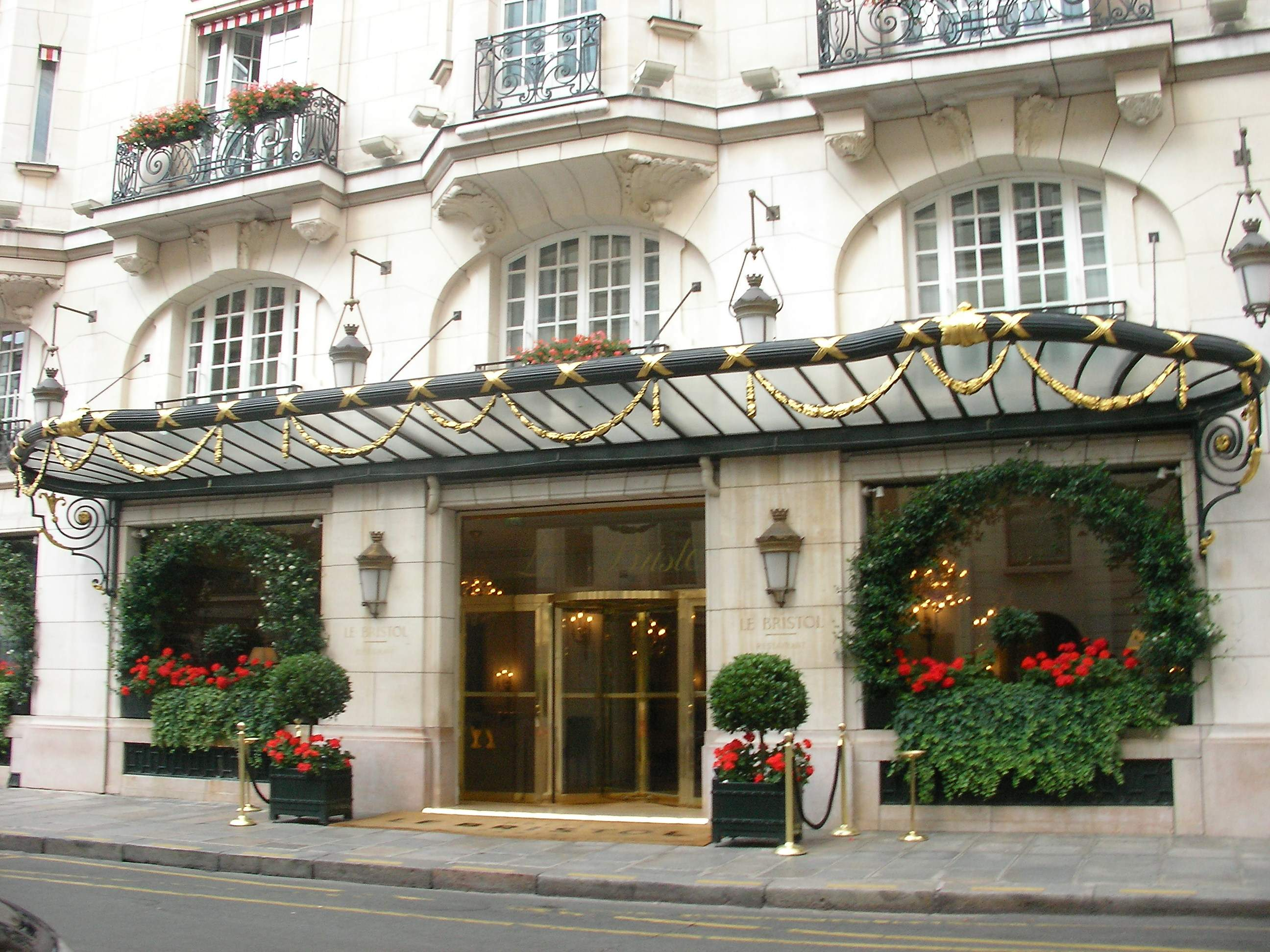
- Front entrance of the hotel

- Location within Paris

General information
- Type: Luxury hotel
- Classification: ("Palace" grade)
- Location: 112 rue du Faubourg Saint-Honoré, Paris, France
- Coordinates: 48°52′19″N 2°18′54″E
- Opened: April 1925
- Operator: Oetker Hotels

Other information
- Number of rooms: 161
- Number of suites: 72

Website
- lebristolparis.com

Le Bristol Paris is a five-star hotel located at 112 rue du Faubourg Saint-Honoré in Paris, France. It opened in 1925 and is famous for its historic architecture. The hotel is part of Oetker Hotels, Masterpiece Hotels, which is owned by the Oetker family and was founded by Rudolf August Oetker.

It is the only major luxury hotel in Paris still in European hands that is not part of a chain or a limited partnership.

== History ==
Located on rue du Faubourg Saint-Honoré, Le Bristol Paris emerged as one of the top Parisian hotels by 1877, when ex-president Ulysses S. Grant and his entourage stayed there for five weeks during his post-presidency world tour.

In 1923, Hippolyte Jammet purchased the property of Julles de Castellane on the Faubourg. Jammet's mission was to transform this mansion into one of the most luxurious hotels. The name Hôtel Le Bristol, which had been familiar in Place Vendôme from the mid-19th century until World War I, derives originally from Bishop Frederick Augustus Hervey, 4th Earl of Bristol, known for his high demand for luxury when he travelled on the Continent during the 18th century. The hotel opened in 1925.

Beginning in June 1940, during the Second World War, Le Bristol became the home of the American embassy and various American nationals living in Paris. Hippolyte Jammet succeeded in keeping his hotel and worked to maintain its prestige during the war, carrying out renovation projects as well as maintenance. During this time the renovations at the hotel were overseen by Leo Lehrman, who was Jewish. During the German occupation of France, he reportedly hid in Suite 106, a room removed from the hotel’s records, where he remained for around three years until the end of the war. Little is known about his later life or descendants. The wrought-iron elevator in the hotel’s reception area is attributed to Lehrman’s design and was reportedly donated by him to the hotel.

Following the opening of Pierre Cardin's boutique at 118 rue du Faubourg Saint-Honoré in 1954, many other luxury brands began to open boutiques there. With the opening of boutiques such as Lanvin and Christian Lacroix, the hotel was frequented by clients such as Charlie Chaplin, Rita Hayworth and other celebrities. From the 1960s and onwards, Le Bristol became a destination for fashion photographers. In 1962, the hotel was ranked number one by the American travel guide Fielding's, thus cementing its reputation in America as one of the top hotels. In 1968, the hotel was taken over by Hippolyte's son Pierre, who postponed some restoration work due to riots in May 1968.

During the 1970s, Le Bristol underwent major expansions and renovations. In 1978, it was acquired by Rudolf August Oetker, founder of the German industrial group Oetker and an owner of other hotels on the French Riviera. Oetker began extension work in the 1980s, which included expansion of the hotel's rooms, restoration of the garden, and a 6th-floor swimming pool with views of the Parisian skyline.

In 1994, Pierre Ferchaud was appointed as manager of the hotel. He would later become the managing director. During his time managing the hotel, Ferchaud converted some of the guestrooms into luxury suites. In 2004, the hotel underwent a huge restoration and renovation. 2004 also saw the creation of Le Bristol's "fashion high teas". In 2005, the bar of Le Bristol was refurbished.

In 2007, Le Bristol acquired the building next door; this purchase allowed the hotel to become more prominent on the corner of avenue Matignon and rue du Faubourg Saint-Honoré. This also allowed the hotel to show sculptural exhibits.

In 2009, the Matignon Residence, Le Bristol's renovation of the building next door, was unveiled with an additional twenty-one rooms, five suites, and a new restaurant, 114 Faubourg.

In 2010, Le Bristol recruited a new manager, Didier Le Calvez. From 2010 until 2016, the hotel completed a six-year, $190 million renovation. It was fitted with two new honeymoon suites, offering views of Paris. The restaurant was renovated in a French style while still serving the same food. A children's play area and hair salon were also added.

== Characteristics ==
Le Bristol contains 188 rooms. The amenities include a La Prairie Spa, a pool viewing the Sacré-Cœur, Paris, and a fitness centre.

In 2018, the hotel partnered with Opera Gallery to exhibit work by Manolo Valdés, and showed sculpture by Ugo Rondinone and a site-specific work by Daniel Buren, both in association with Galerie Kamel Mennour.

== Architecture ==
The building has a large limestone facade and a glass-and-wrought-iron elevator. The swimming pool resembles the front of a large sailboat; it is notable for being designed by architect Pinnau, who also designed the yachts of the Onassis and Niarchos family. The architecture and decor reflect the 18th-century history of when the hotel was originally built. Le Bristol has recently invested over $30 million in renovations, refurbishing, amenities, and rooms. The signature decor is the toile de Jouy, which includes classic patterned furnishings and floral motifs.

== Popular culture ==
Le Bristol featured in Woody Allen's film Midnight in Paris (2011). The hotel is also mentioned in Outcasts: A Seal Team Six Novel by Stephen Templin and Howard E. Wasdin.

Le Bristol has also hosted many celebrities such as Taylor Swift, who slept there on the Parisian nights of her Eras tour, and David Beckham, who lived in one of the hotel’s suites for six months while playing for Paris Saint-Germain F.C. in 2013. Upon checking out, he left behind 100 pink roses as a gift to the hotel.

== See also ==
- The Leading Hotels of the World
