= Kugelmann =

Kugelmann is a surname. Notable persons with that name include:

- Georges Kugelmann (1809–1882), German-born French printer
- Hans Kugelmann (died 1542), German composer
- Joachim Kugelmann (born 1971), German motorcycle speedway rider
- Louis Kugelmann (1828–1902), German gynecologist, social democratic thinker and activist
