= Heinz Beck =

Heinz Beck may refer to:

- Heinz Beck (footballer) (1928–2006), German footballer
- Heinz Beck (chef) (born 1963), German chef
