= Palácio Tangará =

Hotel in São Paulo, Brazil

General information
- Location: Rua Deputado Laércio Corte, 1501, São Paulo, Brazil
- Opening: 2017
- Owner: Brightshore Capital fund
- Operator: Oetker Hotels

Other information
- Number of rooms: 141
- Number of suites: 59
- Number of restaurants: 2

Palácio Tangará is a luxury hotel located next to Burle Marx Park in São Paulo, Brazil. It was opened in 2017 and is operated by Oetker Hotels, with funds managed by Brightshore Capital.

== History ==
The site was formerly part of Chácara Tangará, an estate belonging to Francisco Matarazzo Pignatari, known as Baby Pignatari. In the late 1940s, Pignatari commissioned Oscar Niemeyer to design a house there, with gardens by Roberto Burle Marx. The house was never finished. Part of the former estate was later donated to the city, which opened Burle Marx Park on the site in 1995.

Plans for a hotel on adjoining land began in the late 1990s. The developer Birmann Engenharia worked on the project with PREVI, the pension fund for Banco do Brasil employees, but construction stopped in the early 2000s after Birmann ran into financial difficulties. The unfinished structure stood empty until 2013, when GTIS Partners bought the site and resumed work.

Palácio Tangará opened to guests in 2017. It has since been included in Condé Nast Traveler's Hot List 2018, Gold List 2020, and Readers' Choice Awards.

== Building and facilities ==
Interior of Tangará Jean-Georges Restaurant

The hotel occupies a five-story neoclassical building with a symmetrical façade. The arches and moldings of the unfinished 1990s structure were retained and completed with further detailing. There are 141 rooms, including 59 suites, on the upper floors. The hotel also has two restaurants, event rooms, a fitness center, indoor and outdoor pools, and a spa area.

The interiors were designed by two São Paulo firms: Anastassiadis Arquitetos handled the public areas, including the lobby, restaurants, bar and spa, and Bick Simonato handled the guestrooms, corridors and exterior detailing. B+H Architects and PAR Arquitetura also worked on the renovation and completion of the building.

The hotel houses a Tangará Jean-Georges restaurant, opened in partnership with chef Jean-Georges Vongerichten. It holds one star in the Michelin Guide.

== Naming Origin ==
The name Tangará refers to the Chiroxiphia caudata, a bird native to the Atlantic Forest and known for the elaborate courtship dance performed by its males — an inspiration that reflects the hotel’s connection to Brazilian identity and the natural surroundings of the property.

== Sustainability Commitments ==
Since 2019, Palácio Tangará has maintained two hives of native stingless bees, contributing to biodiversity conservation and the pollination of vegetation in its surroundings.

Palácio Tangará supports community projects and animal protection initiatives, including A Lista de São Francisco, an organisation dedicated to rescuing, caring for, and facilitating the responsible adoption of abandoned or vulnerable animals.

== Accreditations ==
1. Two stars in the Michelin Guide for the hotel.
2. One star in the Michelin Guide for Tangará Jean-Georges Restaurant.
3. Ranked on the 4th place in Top 20 Hotels of South America: Readers’ Choice Awards 2026, and 1st place in Brazil.
