= Sablon =

Sablon, a French word, may refer to:

- Sablon (in French) or Zavel (in Dutch), a square on a hill by the same name, in the old area of Brussels
- Sablons (disambiguation), the name of several communes in France
- Sablon diecast, a miniature toy car maker from Belgium
- Sablon, California, a ghost town in the Mojave Desert

People with the surname Sablon:

- Germaine Sablon, French singer and actress
- Jean Sablon, French singer and actor
- Paul Sablon (1888–1940), Belgian film director and animal trainer
