= Sablons =

Sablon (in French) is a fine sand used as an abrasive and may refer to the following:

== Surname ==
- Edmond Tarbé des Sablons, (1838-1900), French journalist and man of letters
- Germaine Sablon (1899–1985), French singer and film actress, sister of Jean Sablon
- Jean Sablon (1906–1994), popular French singer and actor
- Michelle Catherine Josephine Guespereau Tarbé des Sablons (1777–1855), French author and composer, also known as Mme. Tarbé des Sablons

== Toponyms ==
- Sablons, Gironde, a commune in France
- Sablon (Brussels), an area in the historic center of Brussels, Belgium
- Sablon, a neighborhood of Metz
- Les Sablons station, a Paris Metro station in Neuilly-sur-Seine, France
- Blanc-Sablon, Quebec, municipality on North-Shore in Quebec, Canada
