= Alfred Grévin =

French artist (1827–1892)

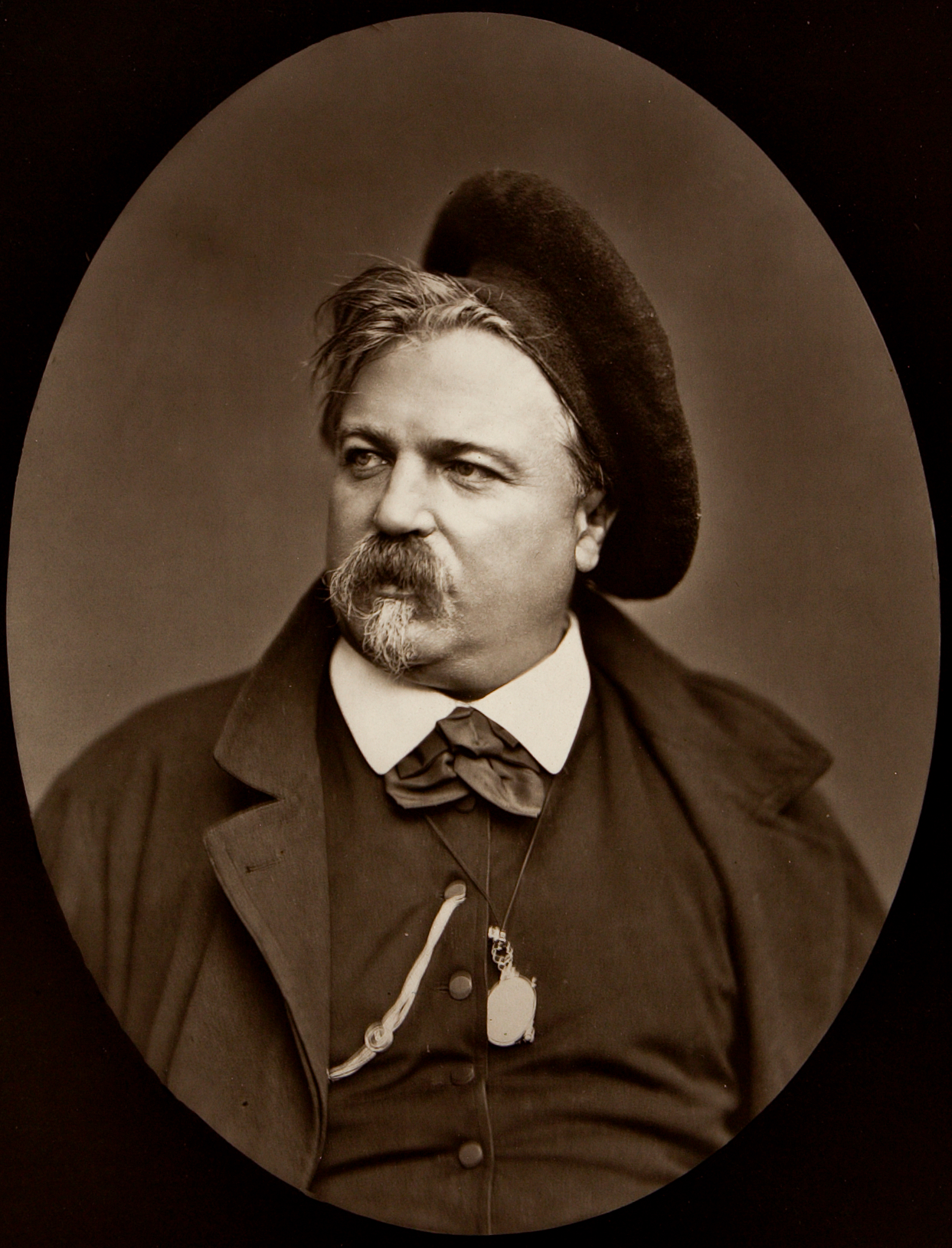
- Born: 28 January 1827; Épineuil, France
- Died: 5 May 1892 (aged 65); Saint-Mandé, France

Signature
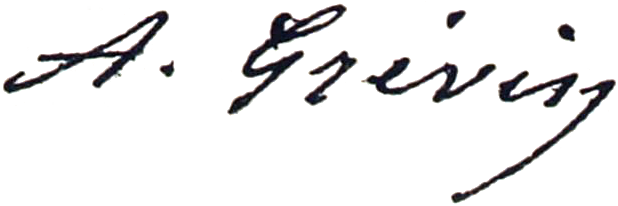

Alfred Grévin (French pronunciation: [alfʁɛd ɡʁevɛ̃]; 28 January 1827 – 5 May 1892) was a 19th-century caricaturist, best known during his lifetime for his caricature silhouettes of contemporary Parisian women. He was also a sculptor, cartoonist, and designed costumes and sets for popular theater.

He founded with journalist Arthur Meyer the Musée Grévin, a waxwork museum.

== Career ==
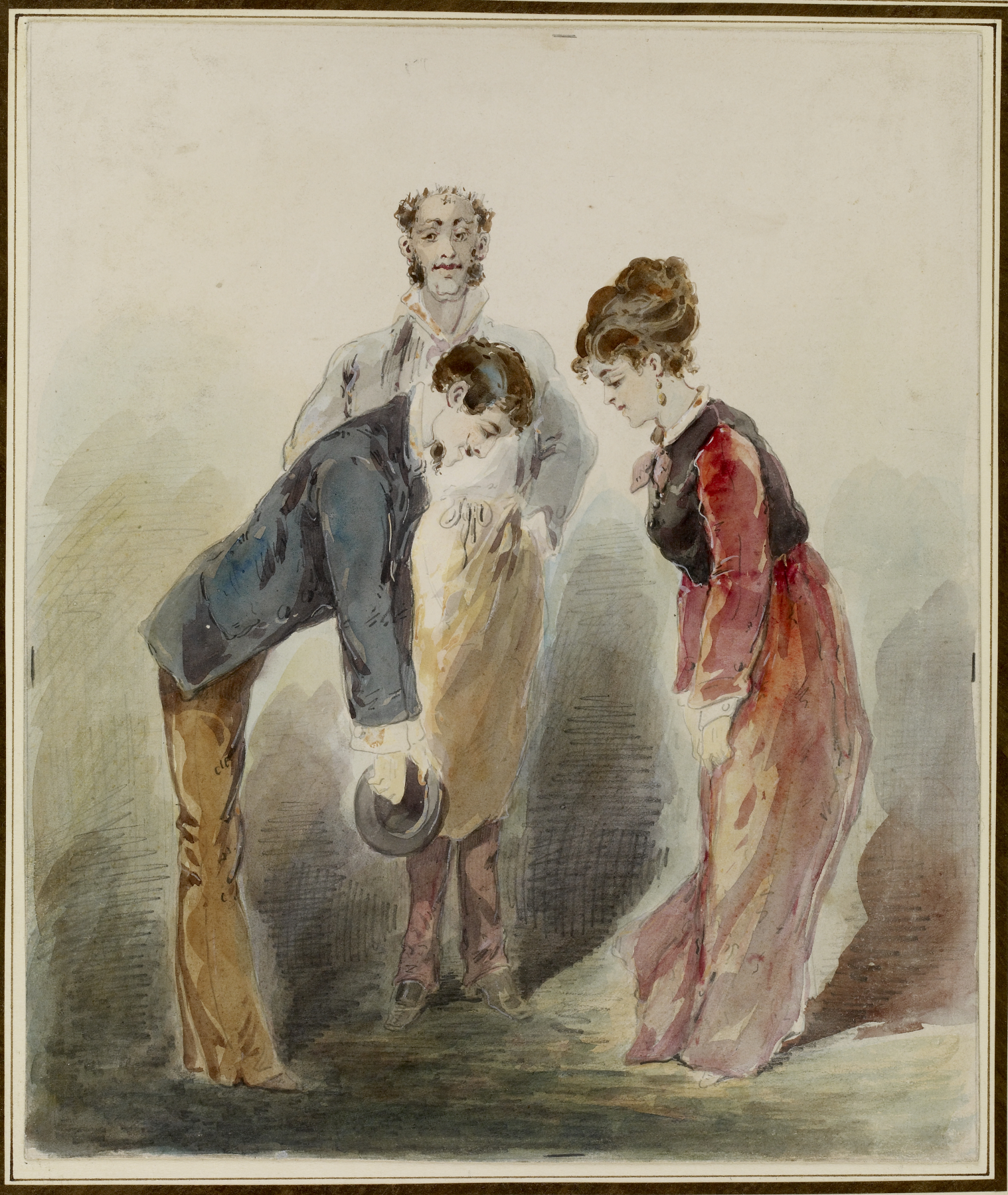
Man Bowing to a Woman, 24.13 x 20.32 cm. Walters Art Museum

Alfred Grevin was born in a house in the main street of Épineuil in 1827. He studied natural sciences and drawing at the College of Tonnerre. His first job was as an apprentice draughtsman for Paris à Lyon à la Méditerranée railways. In his free time, he would draw for fun.

In 1853 he moved to Paris. He put his cartooning talents at the service of the newspaper Le Gaulois, then headed by Arthur Meyer. He then went on to work for Le Journal amusant and Le Charivari. To supplement his meager salary as a cartoonist and illustrator, he worked as a theater costume designer, and wrote plays.

By 1867 he was able settle in a home in Saint-Mandé, at 16bis rue de Berulle.

In 1869 he founded l'Almanach des Parisiennes with Louis Adrien Huart, and in 1875 Grévin designed the 673 costumes for Jacques Offenbach's opéra-féerie Le voyage dans la lune, and later for Charles Lecocq's opera comique The Daughter of Madame Angot.

In 1881, Meyer had the idea, along with Alfred Grévin, to represent the personalities that made the front page of the news section as wax mannequins, which allowed visitors – in an era before photography was used in the press – to put a face to the names in the news. This was the beginning of the Musée Grévin, which opened its doors on 5 June 1882 and swiftly became successful. Grévin met Émile Zola on several occasions, whom he wanted to include a portrait of in his collections.

Grevin spent the final two years of his life paralyzed, and died of a sudden stroke of apoplexy in 1892 at Saint-Mandé.

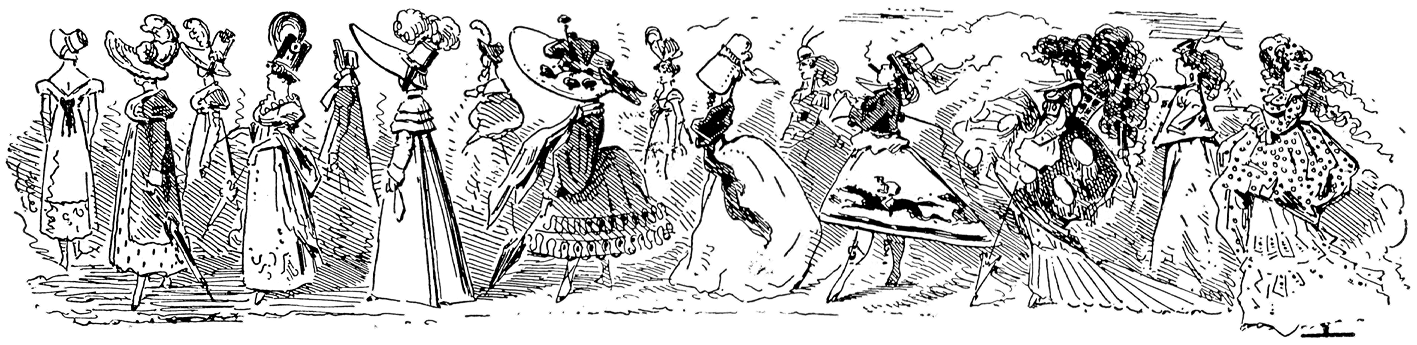
A ca. 1870s caricature by Grévin which seems to express his view of the progressive downfall of women's fashions over the course of the nineteenth century so far.
