= Mme. Tarbé des Sablons =

French author and composer

Michelle Catherine Josephine Guespereau Tarbé des Sablons (1777–1855) was a French author and composer. She was best known for her "moral" novels, but also composed several operas. She was generally known as Mme. Tarbé des Sablons.

She married the lawyer Sébastien André Tarbé des Sablons in March 1795. They lived in Melun, France, and had two sons, Edmond and Eugène. Edmond published several novels, and both brothers wrote music criticism for Le Figaro newspaper.

In 1872, the Pall Mall Budget reported that "a new comic opera, La chanson de l'étoile, the libretto by Edouard Blau, and the music by Louis Gérome, [was] in reality [composed by] Mme. Tarbé des Sablons."

Some of Tarbé des Sablons' music was published in a supplement to Le Gaulois called A Nos Abonnes. Her publications included:

== Selected works ==
=== Books ===
- Auguste et Therese
- Eudolie Ou La Jeune Malade (Eudolia Or The Young Sick)
- La Marquise de Valcour Ou Le Triomphe de l'Amour Maternel (The Marquise de Valcour Or The Triumph of Maternal Love)
- Roseline ou De la Nécessité de la Religion dans l Education des Femmes (Roseline or On the Necessity of Religion in the Education of Women)
- Onesie Ou Les Soirees de l'Abbaye (Onesie Or The Evenings of the Abbey)

=== Operas ===
- I Batavi (on The Siege of Leyde)
- Les Bataves
- Les Brigands (text based on Schiller)

=== Vocals ===
- "Ave Maria"
