= The Lanesborough =

Hotel in Knightsbridge, London

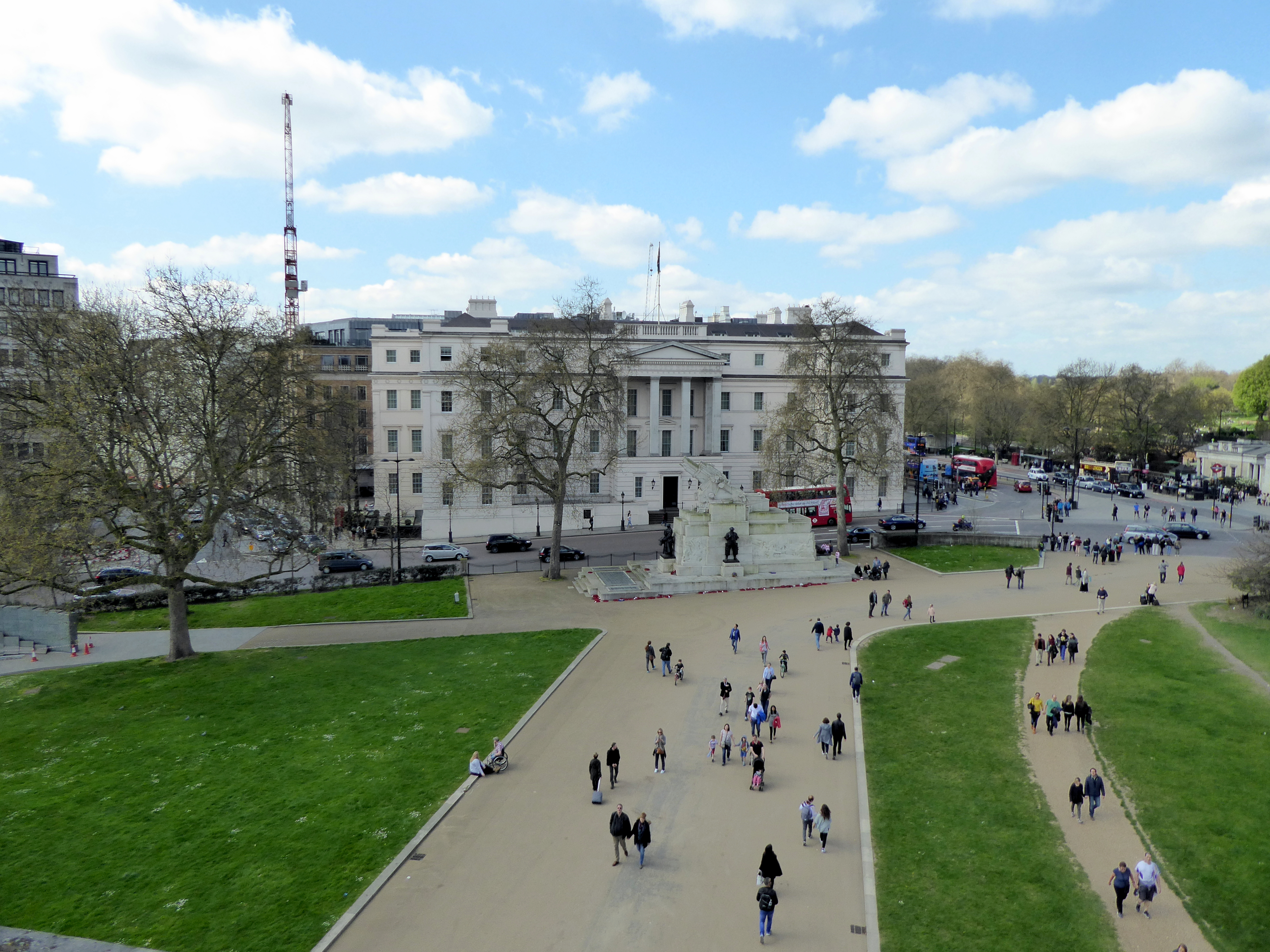
- The Lanesborough from Wellington Arch

- Location within Central London

General information
- Location: Hyde Park Corner, Knightsbridge, London, UK
- Coordinates: 51°30′09″N 0°09′09″W
- Opened: 1991
- Operator: Oetker Hotels

Other information
- Number of rooms: 93
- Number of suites: 43
- Number of restaurants: 1
- Parking: Available on site for a fee

Website
- The Lanesborough

The Lanesborough is a 5-star hotel on Hyde Park Corner in Knightsbridge, central London, England. The hotel is operated by Oetker Hotels. It occupies the neoclassical former building of St George's Hospital, which is listed Grade II*. The hotel is situated next to Hyde Park Corner tube station.

== History ==
St George's Hospital was opened in the original Lanesborough House, the home in London of the Viscounts Lanesborough, in 1733. By the 1800s, the hospital was falling into disrepair. Lanesborough House was demolished to make way for a new 350-bed facility. Building began in 1827 under architect William Wilkins. The new building was operational by 1844, and served continuously as a hospital until the hospital transferred in the 1970s to Tooting, south London, leaving the Hyde Park Corner premises vacant in 1980. When the health service decided to shut St George's Hospital, as the building then was, it was found that when the former Duke of Westminster sold the building to the state, he had inserted a clause in the agreement allowing his estate to buy it back at the same price if the building ever ceased to be a hospital. The Duke of Westminster duly took up the option to buy the building for its 19th-century price, £6,000.

Rosewood Hotels & Resorts refurbished and re-opened the building as a hotel in 1991. Furniture was supplied by Arthur Brett and Sons. In May 2002, the management contract passed to Starwood's St. Regis brand. In November 2014, Oetker Hotels assumed management, the group's first hotel in the United Kingdom.

The Lanesborough was closed for renovation in December 2013 and re-opened in 2015. In 2015, it was reputedly the most expensive hotel in London.

== Culinary awards ==
In 2009, the Lanesborough announced the launch of 'Apsleys – a Heinz Beck Restaurant', under chef Heinz Beck, who had won three Michelin stars for his cuisine at La Pergola in Rome. The restaurant began service in September 2009 and was awarded its first Michelin star less than five months later in January 2010, the fastest time for a new London restaurant to achieve a star. The dining room was subsequently rebranded as Céleste for the 2015 opening, and was again awarded a Michelin star in 2016, but lost it in 2022. It was subsequently relaunched as the Lanesborough Grill.

== See also ==
- Grade II* listed buildings in the City of Westminster (A–Z)
- Earl of Lanesborough
