= Hôtel du Cap =

Hotel in Antibes, France

Coordinates: 43°32′53″N 7°07′14″E

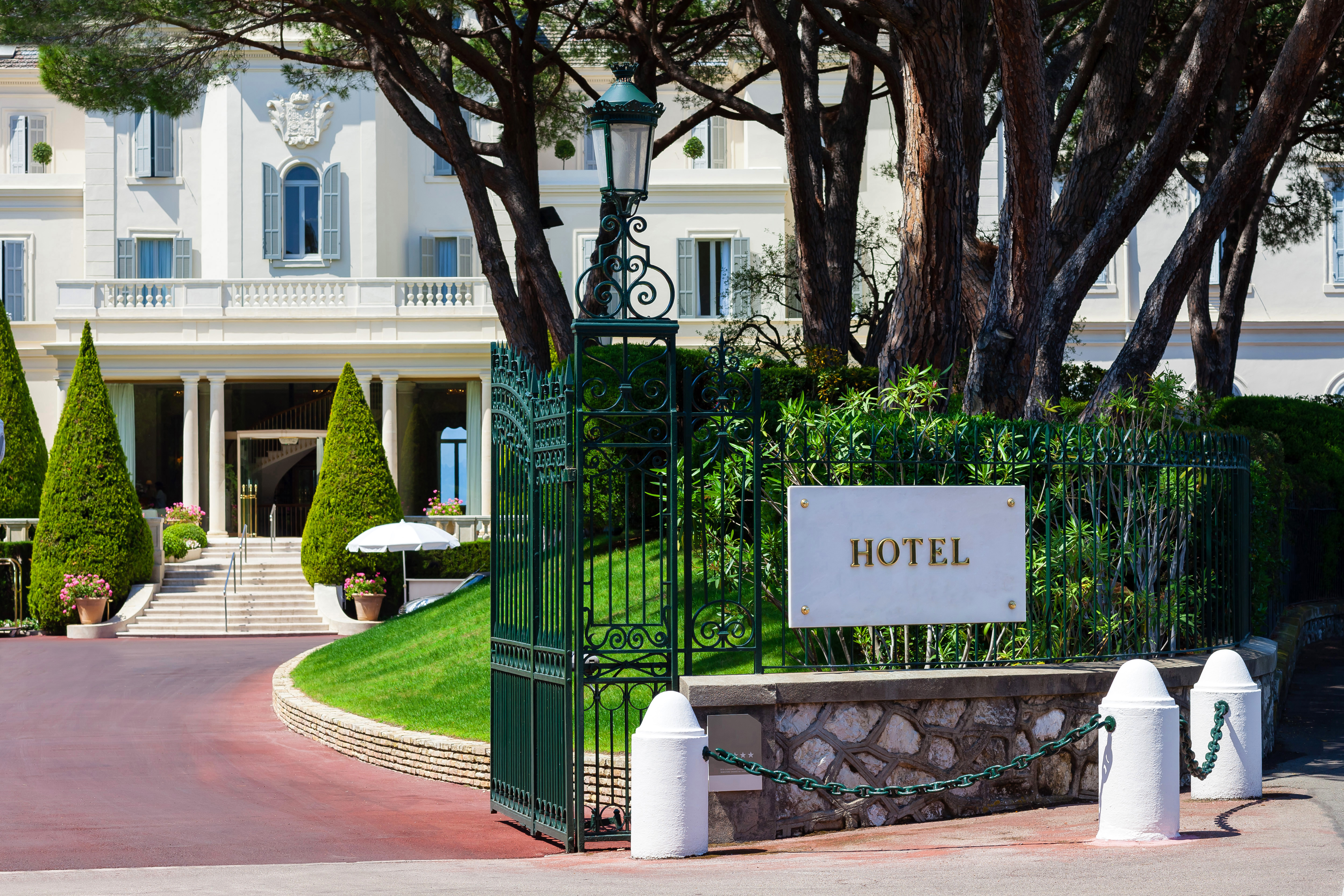
Main entrance to the Hôtel du Cap-Eden-Roc

The Hôtel du Cap-Eden-Roc or simply Hôtel du Cap is a resort hotel in Antibes on the French Riviera. Opened in 1870 after a grand launch party as a private mansion under the name Villa Soleil, it became a hotel in 1889.

== History ==
The founder of France's Le Figaro newspaper, Hippolyte de Villemessant, built the Villa Soleil between 1865 and 1870, in the Napoleon III architectural style, for writers seeking inspiration. In 1887, Italian hotelier Antoine Sella bought the property, and opened the Grand Hôtel du Cap in 1889.

In 1914, Antoine Sella built the Eden Roc pavilion (event space) was built 400 yards away from the main hotel in a more nautical-inspired design. Gerald and Sara Murphy, a young American couple who had expatriated to France in the 1920s, once rented the hotel for an entire summer, a unique event for the era as the French Riviera was not a summer destination at the time, but a winter escape for the wealthy. With the Murphys came many writers and artists of the Lost Generation, including F. Scott Fitzgerald and Ernest Hemingway. Fitzgerald immortalized it as the Hôtel des Etrangers in Tender Is the Night. Marc Chagall made sketches in one of the shady beachside cabanas after their construction in the 1960s.

During World War One the hotel was used as an American Red Cross convalescent home for the rehabilitation and recovery of hundreds of wounded soldiers and nurses. This time started to change the tourism landscape of the French Riviera; this area was historically seen as a winter destination and too hot in summer. However, when Antoine Sella saw the Red Cross nurses swimming in the sea to cool off he was inspired to build a seawater pool, which was the start of the French Riviera's summer season.

In 1931, when Antoine (Antonio) Sella died, the running of the hotel passed to his son André (Andrea) who developed the hotel to a new level. The Kennedy family summered here in 1938 when John F. Kennedy was 21 years old. Guests included Marlene Dietrich, Orson Welles, the Duke and Duchess of Windsor, Winston Churchill and Charles De Gaulle. Elizabeth Taylor and Richard Burton conducted an affair and honeymooned there. The hotel has traditionally been a particular favourite of film stars, especially during the annual Cannes Film Festival.

During World War 2 the Germans had occupied the French Riviera, and by 1943 had secured the occupation of the hotel itself. By August 1944 the Americans had arrived, the Allied invasion of southern France (Operation Dragoon) by the U.S. Navy launched three air strikes, this partially damaged the hotel as they were aiming for the Germans positioned at La Garoupe harbour and the cannons pointing at them, however, these cannons were made of wood and entirely decorative. In the time that followed Grand Hotel du Cap was requisitioned as a military hospital and upon the surrender of the axis forces the allied troops remained at the hotel for 3 years, in order to rebuild and restore.

In 1964, Rudolf August Oetker, a German industrialist, and his wife Maja von Malaisé first spotted the mansion while sailing on the Côte d'Azur in 1964; they bought the hotel five years later after the death of André Sella.

In 1985, some scenes in the film, Under the Cherry Moon, starring and directed by Prince, were filmed at the hotel. In one of the more notable scenes, Prince and co-star Kristin Scott Thomas danced on the picturesque deck at the Eden Roc restaurant to Prince's musical ballad Alexa de Paris, as they bantered wittily toward an impending courtship in the film.

In 1987, The Grand Hotel du Cap was renamed Hotel du Cap-Eden-Roc. This coincided with the same the expansion of the seaside pavilion and the addition of junior suites.

For many years the hotel did not accept credit cards. Only cash was accepted, with most guests wiring money ahead of their stay. In 2006, this policy was dropped. In 2012, TVs were installed. In 2013, guest's hand-drawn selfies included Conan O’Brien, Johnny Depp and Pelé.

In May 2011, the Hôtel du Cap-Eden Roc was hosting, on its principal driveway to the sea, the Croisière 2011–2012 Collection of the Chanel couture house. It also was the scene for designer Karl Lagerfeld's 2011 short-film The Tale of a Fairy, featuring actors and models including Freja Beha, Bianca Balti, Amanda Harlech, Anna Mouglalis, Kristen McMenamy, Baptiste Giabiconi, Sébastien Jondeau, and Mark Vanderloo.

For about twenty years, amfAR, a nonprofit devoted to AIDS research, has held a charity auction at the Hôtel du Cap-Eden-Roc as part of its annual Cinema Against AIDS event at the Cannes Film Festival.

== Amenities ==
The property is composed of 5 buildings:

- Hôtel du Cap

117-suite hotel, former Villa Soleil

- Eden-Roc

pavilion

- Les 2 Fontaines (Les Deux Fontaines)

a two-storey 32-room residence

- Villa Eleana

private villa in front of the property

- Villa Les Cèdres

private villa in the middle of the park

The main hotel, a Napoleon III château, is located on the southern tip of the Cap d'Antibes. It houses 117 suites. Owner Maja Oetker decorates the rooms and suites.

The hotel has 6 bars, and 3 restaurants, including the Michelin 1-star Louroc Restaurant

== Accolades ==
The Hôtel du Cap-Eden-Roc is considered one of the finest hotels in the world. In 2023 it was listed by multiple sources as one of the top 50 hotels in the world and in 2024 was placed on the Conde Nast gold list. The hotel also has several other notable accolades in the last couple of years:

2026: BILANZ Awards 2026 - 300 best Hotels in Europe: Hotel du Cap-Eden-Roc N°2 with 98,1 points

2026: Travel & Leisure World's Best Awards 2026: No. 1 Resort in France

2026: Harper's Bazaar Ultimate Travel Guide 2026: The 30 Best City Hotels in Europe 2026

2026: Newsweek's World's most extraordinary Spas 2026

2026: TATLER Travel Awards 2026: Best Hotel Room Service

2026: Michelin Guide: Hotel du Cap-Eden-Roc awarded 3 Michelin Keys

2025: Condé Nast Traveller Reader's Choice Awards 2025: Hotel du Cap-Eden-Roc – No. 4 in Rest of France Hotels

2025: Condé Nast Traveller Reader's Choice Awards 2025: Hotel du Cap-Eden-Roc – No. 12 in Top Hotels in the South of France and Monaco

2025: The Michelin Guide: The very best three-Michelin-key-hotels in the world

2025: The Zoe Report: The 50 Best Luxury Hotels In The World

2025: Bilanz (CH): "Best resort in Europe" for the third consecutive year

2025: Travel & Leisure (USA): Top 500 Hotels Worldwide

2025: Travel & Leisure (USA): Top 5 Europe Resort

2025: Travel & Leisure (USA): Top 3 Best Resort in France (up from No. 5 in 2024)

2025: Vogue (USA): Dior Spa Eden-Roc selected to be part of the Vogue Spa Guide 2025

2024: World 50 Best Hotels 2024: Hotel du Cap-Eden-Roc no.17 Best Hotel in the world 2024

2024: Bilanz Magazine: N°1 Best Hotel in Europe among the 300 hotels selected

2024: Travel + Leisure 2024 World's Best Awards: Hotel du Cap-Eden-Roc: No. 5 – “5 Favourite Resorts in France”

== Management ==
The Hôtel du Cap-Eden-Roc belongs to Oetker Hotels. Oetker Hotels are managed by the Oetker family.
