= Arthur Meyer (journalist) =

French press baron and journalist (1844-1924)

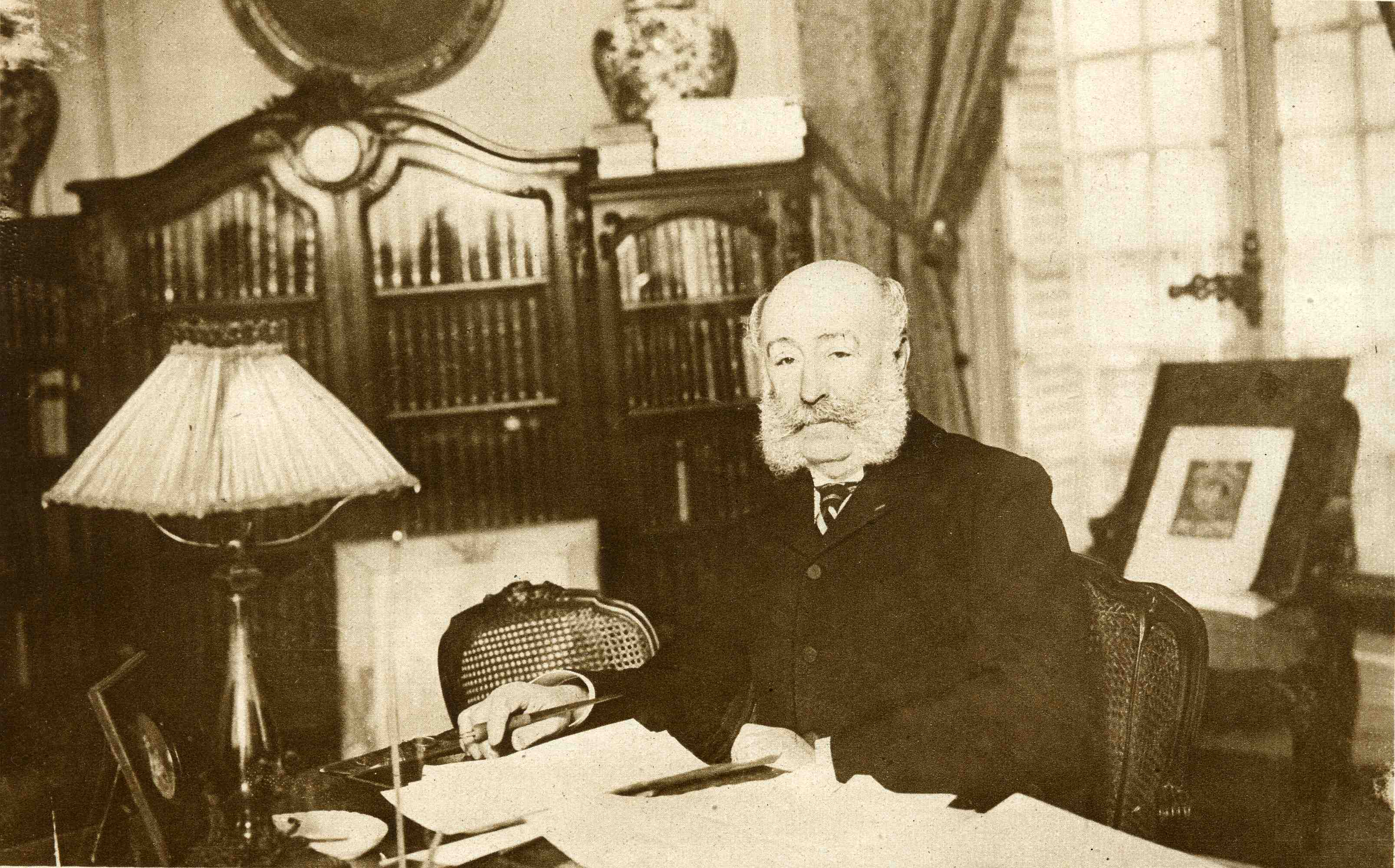
- Born: 16 June 1844; Le Havre, France
- Died: 2 February 1924 (aged 79); Paris, France
- Occupation: Journalist

Arthur Meyer (1844 – 1924) was a French press baron. He was director of Le Gaulois, a notable conservative French daily newspaper that was eventually taken over by Le Figaro (run by François Coty at the time) in 1929. Meyer was a royalist, an unusual personality, a key player at the crossroads of society life, the press and politics under the French Third Republic.

== Early life ==
Arthur Meyer was born on 16 June 1844 in Le Havre, France. He was the grandson of a rabbi from a modest Jewish family.

== Career ==
=== Paris-Journal ===
In 1870 he became the director of the newspaper Paris-Journal. In June 1882, he arranged for the Paris-Journal and Le Gaulois to be merged.

=== Le Gaulois ===
In 1882, Meyer, who had hired Octave Mirbeau as a secretary two years earlier, took over the newspaper Le Gaulois permanently. The paper had been founded in July 1868 by Edmond Tarbé des Sablons and Henri de Pène, and it was essentially the main daily social paper of the nobility and the elite of the bourgeoisie in France. It had been bought from Henri de Pène in 1879. Catering to the high-class socialites, Le Gaulois had a relatively small circulation, between 20 and 30 thousand copies, but it had a very real influence on French society. It was the first newspaper to have a column about films, which first appeared in March 1916. From June 1897 until August 1914, Le Gaulois du dimanche (the Sunday edition of Le Gaulois) was the weekly literary supplement of choice and it contained many serials over the years; it was in Le Gaulois du dimanche that Raymond Roussel's Locus Solus appeared.

=== Other enterprises ===
In 1881, Meyer had the idea, along with Alfred Grévin, to represent the personalities that made the front page of the news section as wax mannequins, which allowed visitors – in an era before photography was used in the press – to put a face to the names in the news. This was the beginning of the Musée Grévin, which opened its doors on 5 June 1882 and swiftly became successful.

== Political life ==
In 1888, Meyer supported the general Georges Ernest Boulanger and plotted with the Duchess of Uzés to bring about the return of the monarchy. He engaged in a duel with Édouard Drumont, who had insulted his origins in La France Juive, and also supported the guilt of fellow Jew Alfred Dreyfus, who was wrongfully accused of treason in the aforementioned Dreyfus affair. Meyer converted to Catholicism in 1901 without ceasing to be the target of the anti-Semitic activist group Action Française.

== Personal life ==
Meyer married Mlle de Turenne, a young aristocrat, in 1904 – a marriage that came relatively late in his life. Meyer died on 2 February 1924 in Paris. He was 79.

== Works ==
- Ce que mes yeux ont vu ("What My Eyes Saw") - 1911
- Forty Years of Parisian Society, London, Eveleigh Nash - 1912
- Ce que je peux dire ("What I Can Say") - 1917
