= Burle Marx Park =

Urban park in São Paulo

- Parque Burle Marx
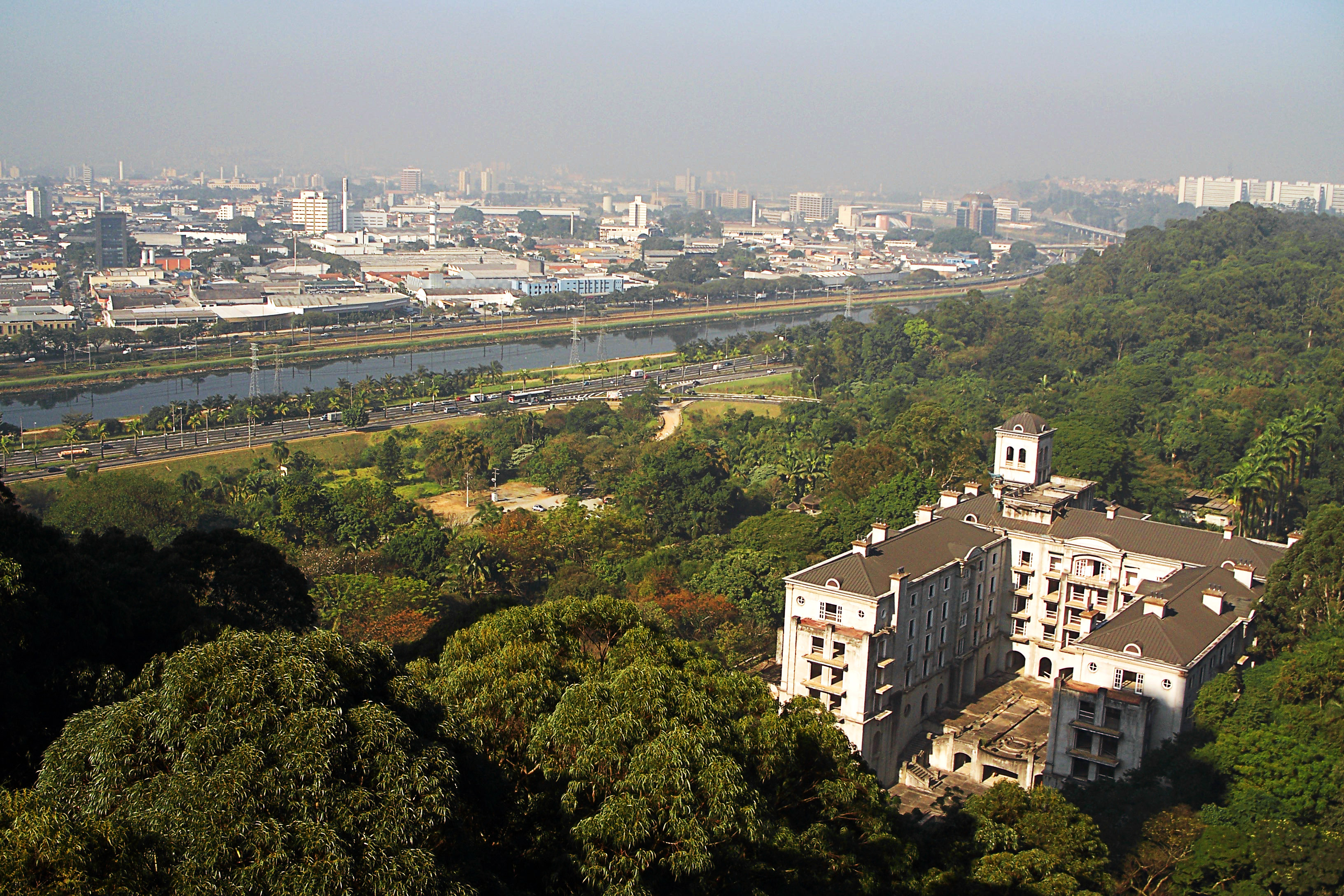
- Interactive map of Burle Marx Park
- Type: Urban park
- Location: Panamby, São Paulo, São Paulo; Brazil
- Coordinates: 23°37′56″S 46°43′17″W
- Area: 0.14 km^{2} (0.054 sq mi)
- Created: 1995
- Administrator: Aron Birmann Foundation

Burle Marx Park (Portuguese: Parque Burle Marx) is located in the Vila Andrade district, in the Brazilian city of São Paulo. It offers a contemplative proposal aimed at preserving the remnants of São Paulo's Atlantic Forest, similar to the Carmo and Anhanguera parks. Inaugurated in 1995, it was inspired by the design made by Roberto Burle Marx for the gardens of the mansion that Baby Pignatari started to build on the site. The house, which was never finished, was later demolished and the gardens that had been planted were reused for the park.

Covering an area of approximately 138,000 square meters, the park includes trail areas, the Jabuticabeira Forest, the Lake District, a large central lawn, a playground, a community garden, a composting station and a space for events. It also includes important structures such as the Casa de Taipa e Pilão, used by the bandeirantes, and the Burle Marx Garden, one of the main attractions.

It is classified as a public municipal park, but is managed by the Aron Birmann Foundation, a non-profit civil society organization in the public interest, which received the right to manage the site after signing an agreement with São Paulo City Hall. Currently, the foundation's private management operates the park with funds from events, product sales, image rights, parking, projects and donations.

== History ==
Burle Marx Park was built on the site of Chácara Tangará, which belonged to Italian-Brazilian businessman Francisco Matarazzo Pignatari, also known as Baby Pignatari, and covered the Panamby neighborhood. In the 1940s, Baby Pignatari decided to build a mansion to live in with Austrian princess Ira von Furstenberg, his future wife. He hired architect Oscar Niemeyer to design the house and landscape artist Roberto Burle Marx to develop ideas for the gardens of the residence.

Baby intended to build the biggest house in Morumbi, but before the work was finished, his marriage to Ira ended; only the garden was completed. The property remained abandoned until the 1980s, when it was sold at auction to Lubeca S/A Empreendimentos (now Panamby Empreendimentos Imobiliários), which intended to build a hotel and commercial buildings on the site, as the area was experiencing a real estate boom. However, the company was unable to proceed with the project after a series of conflicts with environmental groups and appeals from the population, as the area was an ecological protection zone and preserved remnants of the Atlantic Forest.

The presence of an extensive area of preserved forest and the vestiges of Roberto Burle Marx's landscape work resulted in the donation of 29% of the former Chácara Tangará to the City Hall for the creation of the Burle Marx Park. The implementation of the park in the neighborhood created an opportunity for the restoration of the Burle Marx Garden, forgotten for almost forty years. Burle Marx's firm was hired for the project and accompanied all the work in 1992. He missed the park's inauguration in 1995, as he had died in June 1994. After the park opened, São Paulo City Hall signed an agreement with the Aron Birmann Foundation to support, preserve and maintain the site, but maintaining all the advantages of a public park.

== Architectural complex ==
=== Burle Marx Garden ===
Covering approximately 4000 square meters, the Burle Marx Garden is composed of 15 imperial palm trees planted side by side; the Chess Lawn, which is 700 meters long and uses two species of grass (Korean and St. Augustine); the covered space, located behind the Chess Lawn; the reflecting pool and its set of fountains and waterfalls; two concrete panels sculpted in high relief; and the ironwood tree area. The different-shaped canopies provide variable degrees of illumination, ensuring shade in some areas and natural light in others. The trunks and canopies are remarkable features of Burle Marx's work. The Burle Marx Garden is considered an important historical and cultural heritage site for the city of São Paulo.

=== Casa de Taipa e Pilão ===
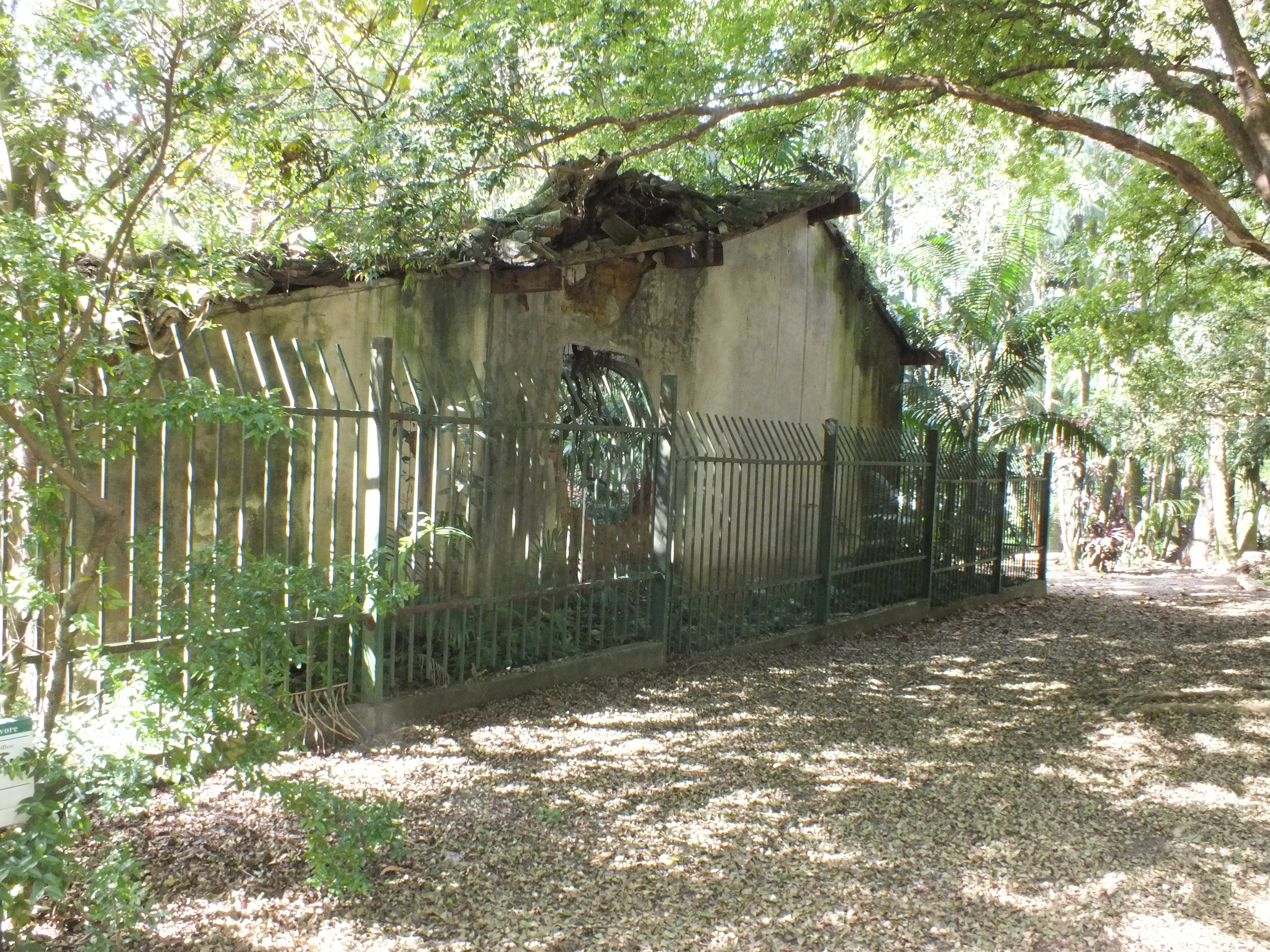
Casa de Taipa e Pilão.

Built in the 19th century, the house was built with rammed earth walls, in line with an ancient building tradition brought to Brazil by the Portuguese and widely used during the colonial period. Today, the structure has been damaged and deteriorated by the passage of time. In 2022, Parque Global, the largest real estate development in Latin America, announced a partnership with the Aron Birmann Foundation to restore the house.

The Casa de Taipa e Pilão is expected to assume new functions linked to culture and education and host an exhibition area detailing the rammed earth construction process and a historical record of the Burle Marx Park, with maps, plans and images related to the work carried out by landscape architects Rosa Kliass and Roberto Burle Marx.

== Historical and cultural significance ==
On December 16, 1992, Burle Marx Park was registered by the Municipal Council for the Preservation of the Historical, Cultural and Environmental Heritage of the city of São Paulo (CONPRESP). However, only the areas of the garden designed by Roberto Burle Marx and two patches of native São Paulo Atlantic Forest that are in a better state of conservation were included.

== Current status ==
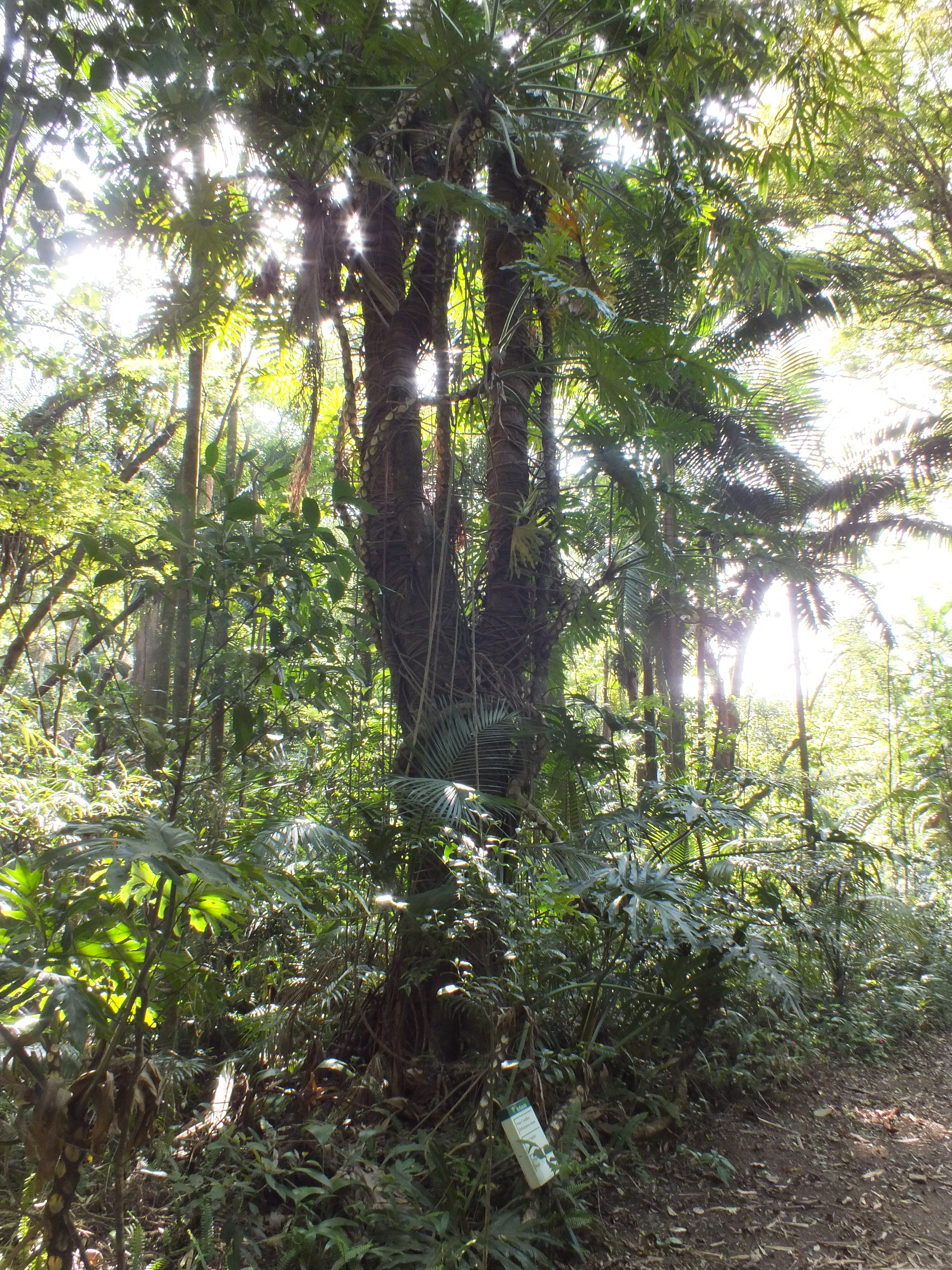
Remaining Atlantic Forest

=== Preservation ===
In 2009, a study conducted by the National Union of Architecture and Consulting Engineering Companies (Sindicato Nacional das Empresas de Arquitetura e Engenharia Consultiva - Sinaenco) to evaluate the maintenance and conservation conditions of São Paulo's parks considered Burle Marx the best in the city. Ibirapuera and Juventude parks ranked second.

=== Fauna and flora ===
The Burle Marx Park has a rich biodiversity derived from the preservation work of the São Paulo Atlantic Forest. It contains 164 species, such as the big-eared opossum, the teiú lizard, the ringed kingfisher and the Amazonian umbrellabird, which is listed as endangered. The flora is composed of landscaped areas and eucalyptus reforestation.

The park also provides Birdwatching, which involves observing a wide variety of birds without intervening in their environment or behavior, helping to educate people about the birds and the biodiversity of the place and promoting awareness of environmental preservation. Visitors can see the distinct features of birds such as the white-tailed kite and the roadside hawk.

=== Activities ===
Burle Marx Park offers projects and initiatives to attract the public, such as:

- Descobrindo o Parque (Discovering the Park): Consists of providing visits for children from Jardim Colombo, a community close to the site. The tours are supervised by the park's biologist and create a great impact and a greater sense of identity. In the park, the children practice sports and leisure activities, discover its spaces and learn to plant in the vegetable garden and value public spaces;
- Ilhas Flutuantes (Floating Islands): The floating islands were provided by Água V and built by Pernod Ricard Brasil during Responsib'All Day 2018, a social and environmental responsibility event held jointly in 85 countries. They are made of recyclable material and contain native phytoremediation plants that purify the lake water. Recently, they served as a new resting place for turtles and aquatic birds. A "lung" (equipment for the massive dissolution of gases in liquids) was donated by Biotecam and installed on the central island to help oxygenate the water through the formation of oxygen microbubbles, essential for the health of the lake;
- Doação Frutas Pão de Açúcar (Pão de Açúcar Fruit Donation): A partnership with the Pão de Açúcar Group (GPA) facilitated the donation of food for the park's monkeys and birds, which attracted more species and ensured that possible imbalances in the environment, such as droughts, excessive rainfall and a lack of native food, would not harm the development of the species. Donations are made weekly and the park's biologist is responsible for choosing and sorting the food for both the animals and the staff;
- Auxílio ao Jardim Colombo (Aid to Jardim Colombo): Jardim Colombo, part of the Paraisópolis Complex in São Paulo, is a community of around 15,000 inhabitants with no square or park for leisure. The area had a plot of about 1,000 m^{2} known as Fazendinha, which was abandoned and converted into a garbage dump. In 2017, the residents of Colombo and nearby organizations mobilized to remove waste and rubble from the site and turn it into a park.

=== Tangará Palace ===
In 2017, Baby Pignatari's unfinished building was renovated by the German group Oetker Collection, which turned it into a six-star hotel. According to São Paulo City Hall, the project is not part of Burle Marx Park.

== Gallery ==
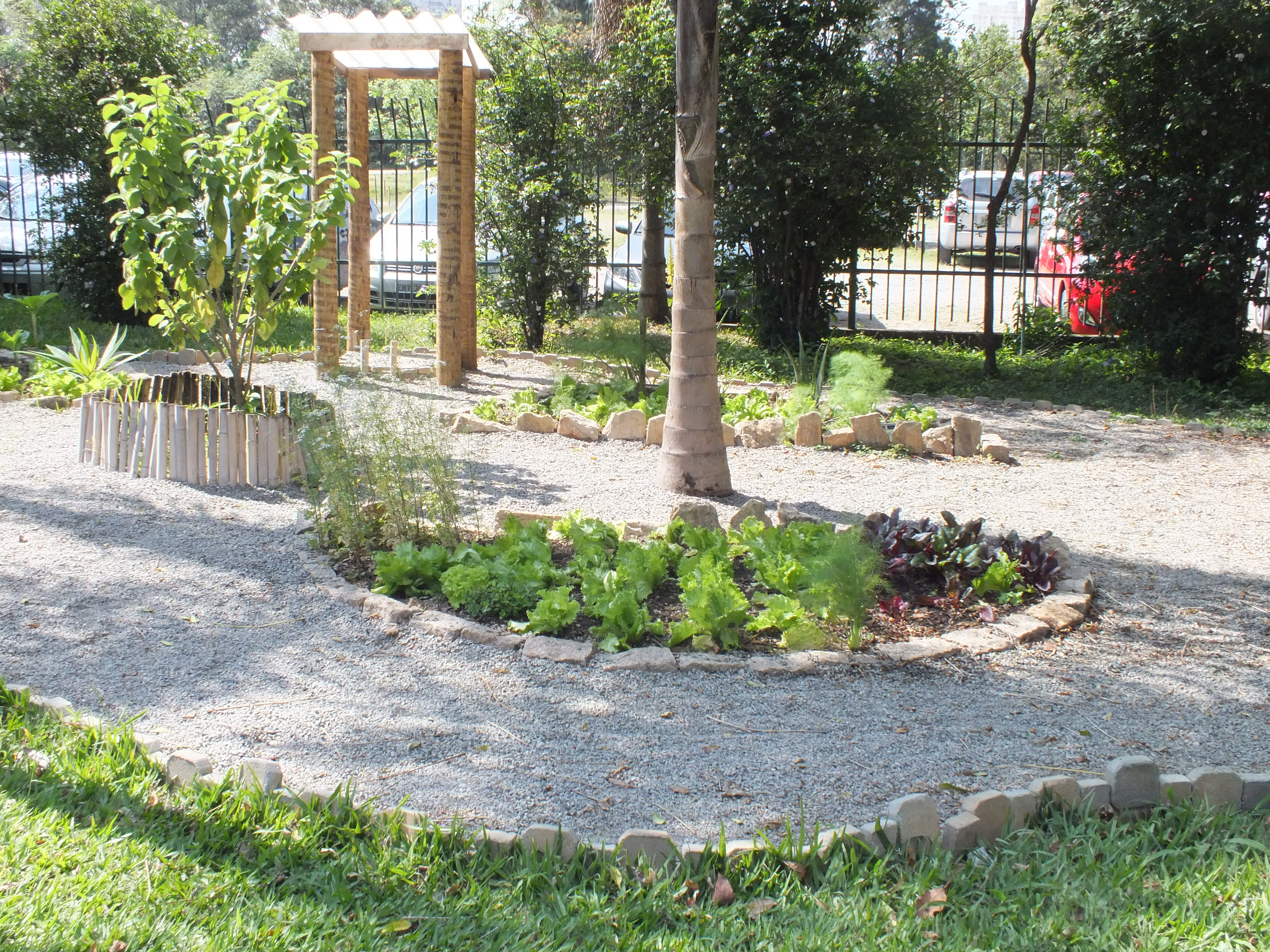
Burle Marx Park vegetable garden.

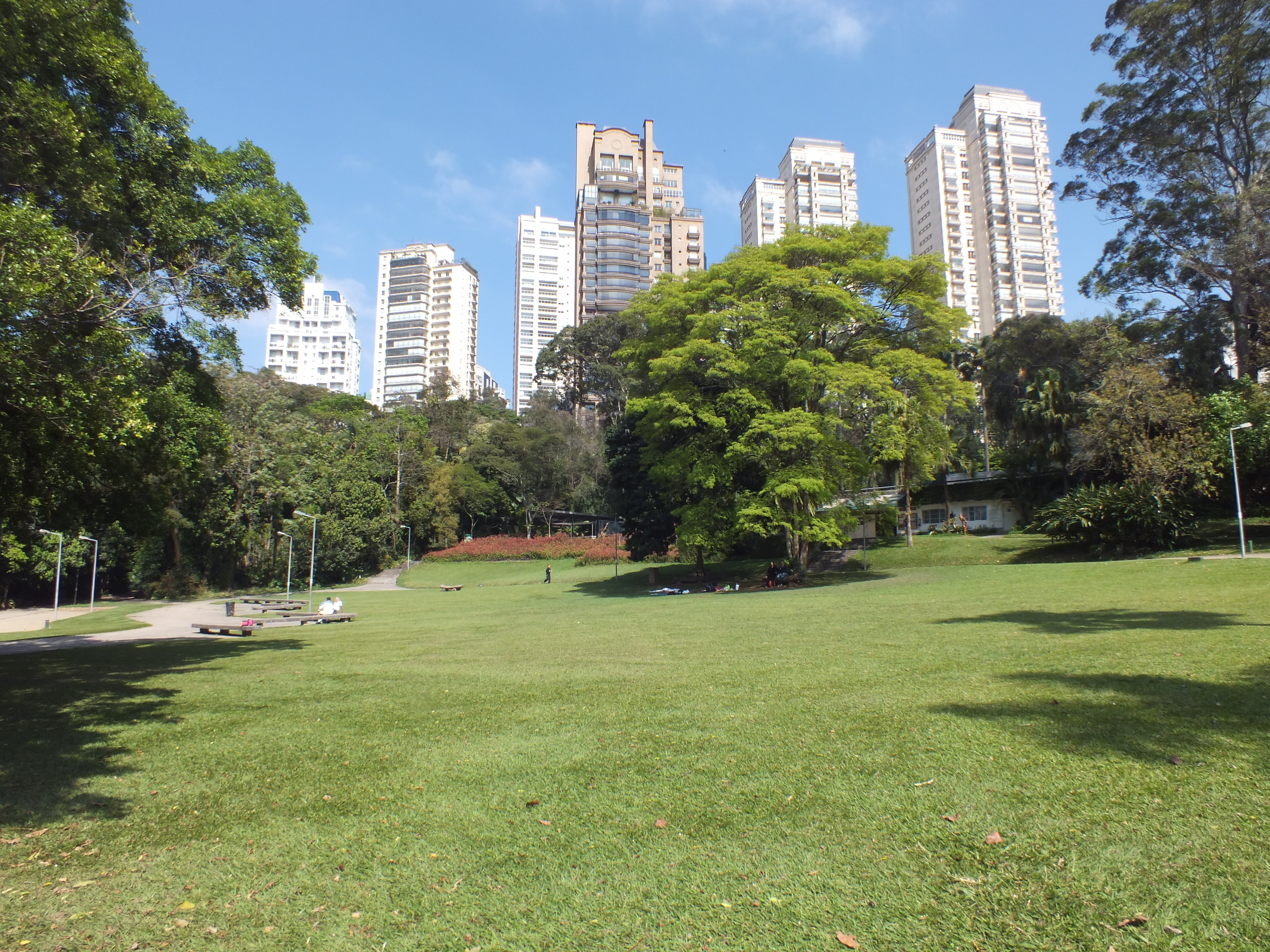
Central garden of Burle Marx Park.

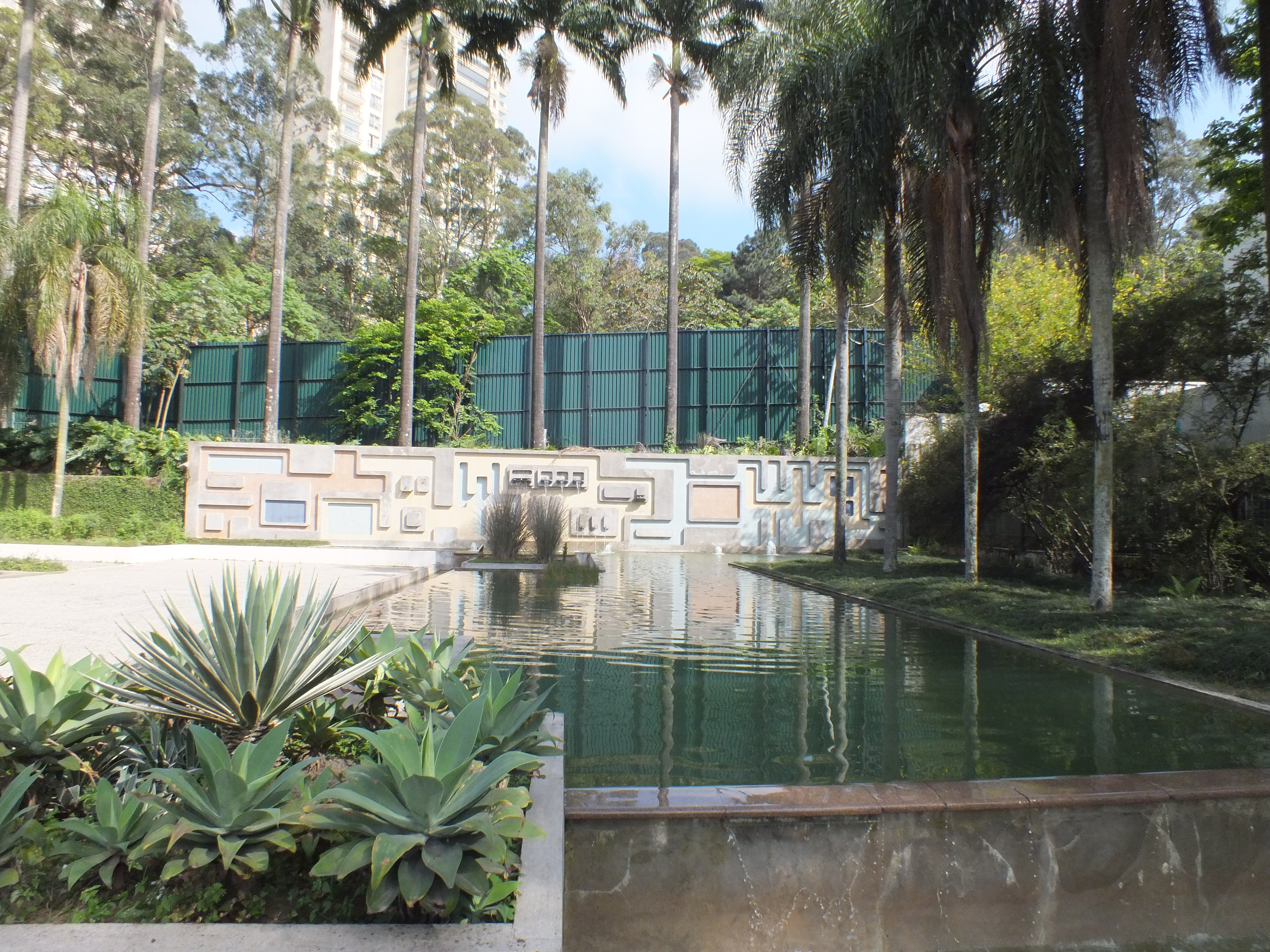
Water mirror in the Burle Marx Garden.

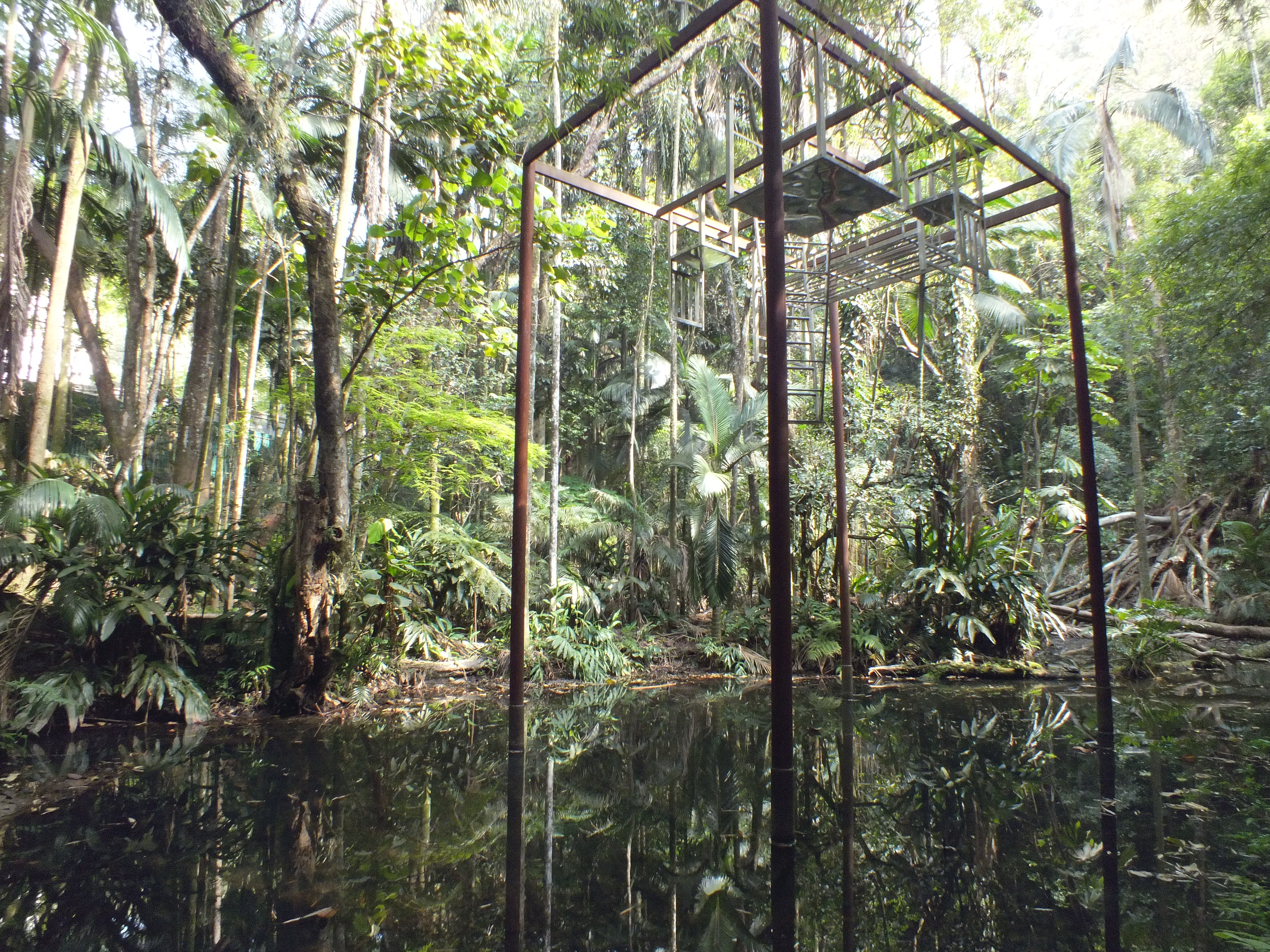
A seven-meter-high sculpture known as "O Descanso da Sala", located on trail A of Burle Marx Park.

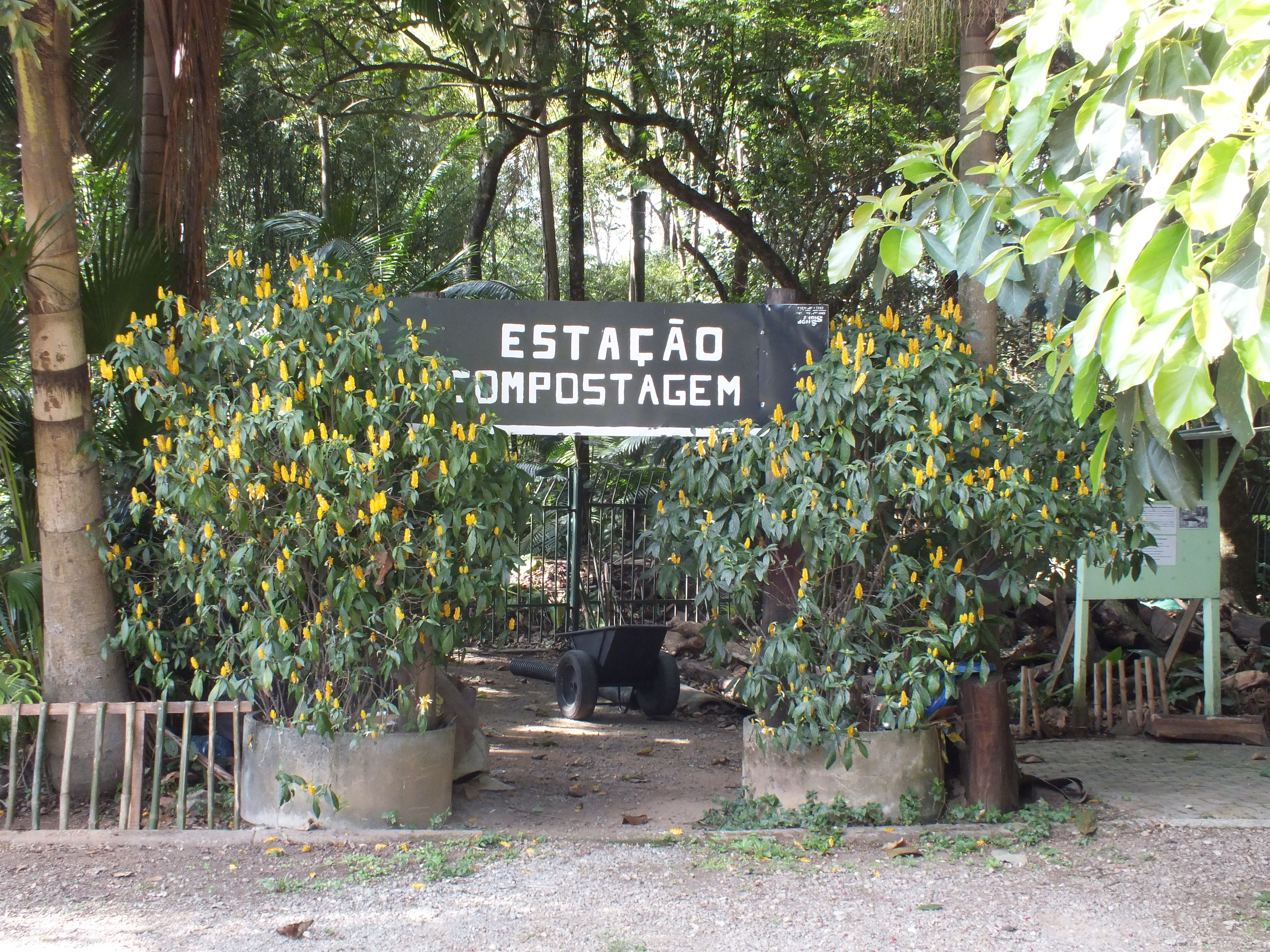
Burle Marx Park Composting Station.

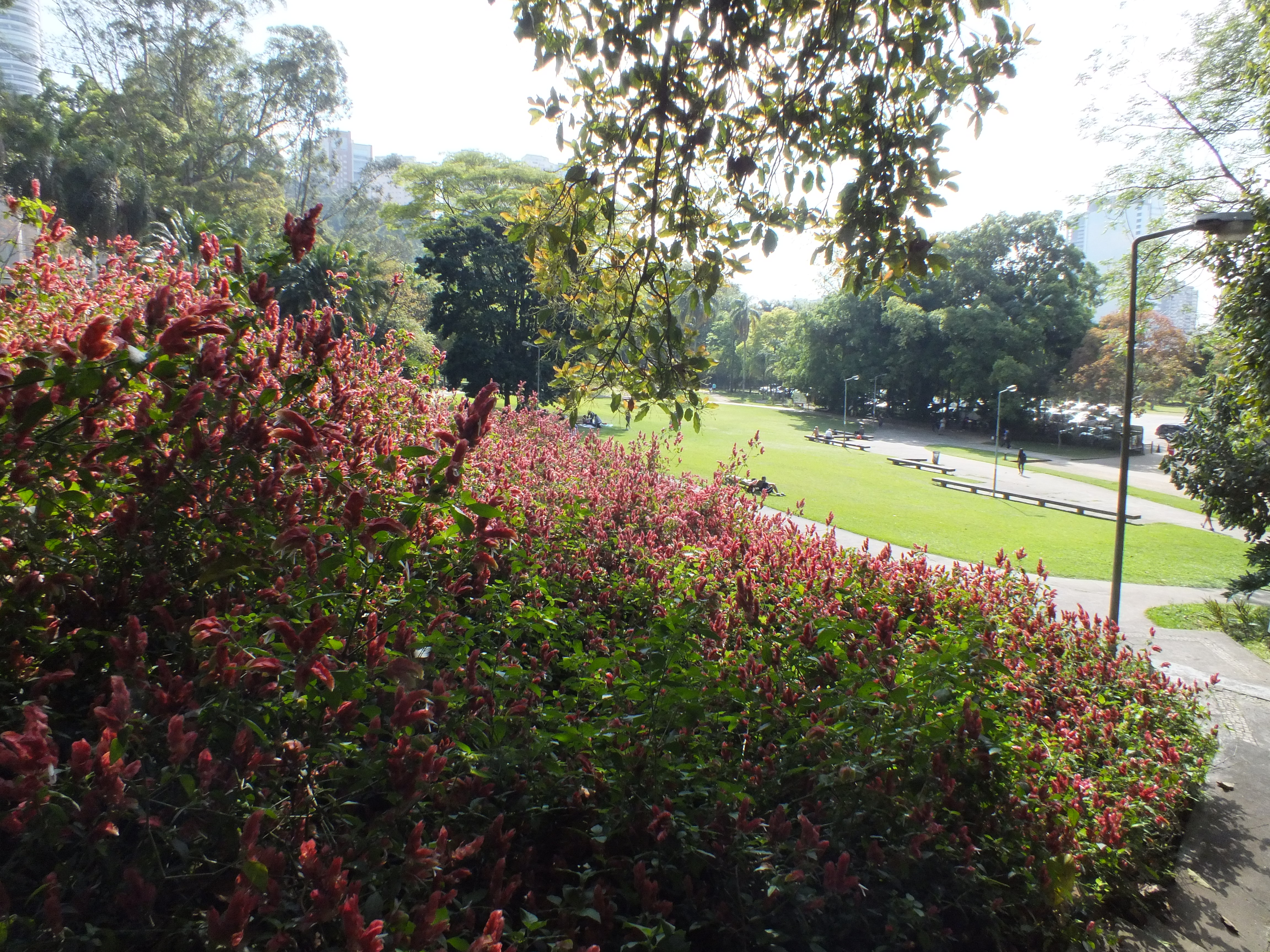
Side view of the Burle Marx Garden.

== See also ==
- Ibirapuera Park
- Flamengo Park
