= Épineuil =

- Commune
- Coat of arms
- Location of Épineuil
- Location within France Location within Bourgogne-Franche-Comté
- Coordinates: 47°52′27″N 3°58′52″E
- Country: France
- Region: Bourgogne-Franche-Comté
- Department: Yonne
- Arrondissement: Avallon
- Canton: Tonnerrois

Government
  - Mayor (2020–2026): Françoise Savie Eustache
- Area^{1}: 6.21 km^{2} (2.40 sq mi)
- Highest elevation: 307 m (1,007 ft)
- Lowest elevation: 139 m (456 ft)
- Population (2023): 508
  - Density: 81.8/km^{2} (212/sq mi)
- Time zone: UTC+01:00 (CET)
  - Summer (DST): UTC+02:00 (CEST)
- INSEE/Postal code: 89153 /89700
- ^{1} French Land Register data, which excludes lakes, ponds, glaciers > 1 km^{2} (0.386 sq mi or 247 acres) and river estuaries.

Épineuil (French pronunciation: [epinœj]) is a commune in the Yonne department in Bourgogne-Franche-Comté in north-central France.

== See also ==
- Communes of the Yonne department
