= Stephen Templin =

American author (born 1967)

- Born: 1967 (age 58–59); San Gabriel, California
- Education: Brigham Young University-Hawaii
- Occupation: Author
- Writing career
- Genres: Thriller, Action, Adventure, Military, Nonfiction
- Military career
- Branch: US Navy
- Rank: Seaman
- Awards: Navy "E" Ribbon, Navy Sea Service Deployment, Navy Expert Rifleman Medal, Navy Expert Pistol Shot Medal
- Website: www.stephentemplin.com

Stephen Templin (born 1967 in San Gabriel, California) is a New York Times and international best-selling author. He co-wrote SEAL Team Six: Memoirs of an Elite Navy SEAL Sniper and is the author of Trident's First Gleaming and From Russia Without Love, the first two books in his Special Operations Group Thriller series. Templin is a "hybrid" author who maintains active book contracts with top publishers such as Simon & Schuster and St. Martin's Press while also publishing independently.

== Life ==
Templin began writing at an early age and in about fourth grade wrote his first short story, an action-adventure about a dog that saved people from a fire. While in elementary school, Templin dreamed of becoming a novelist someday. After high school, he served in the US Navy, and during boot camp, he tried out for Basic Underwater Demolition/SEAL (BUD/S) training but failed the Physical Screen Test (PST). While assigned to the United States Pacific Fleet, he used his free time to write short stories and train for BUD/S and finally passed the PST. He joined BUD/S Class 143 and became friends with Howard E. Wasdin (who later became a SEAL Team Six sniper). During training, Templin was injured and rolled back to Class 144, where he completed Hell Week, became a rifle and pistol expert, conducted demolitions, and practiced small unit tactics. While training at San Clemente Island, he had a feeling that a career in the SEALs was not his destiny, and he withdrew from training. After the Navy, Templin volunteered to become a missionary and served for two years in Japan. Then he attended Brigham Young University-Hawaii, where he graduated magna cum laude. He returned to Japan and became a tenured professor at Meio University, where he lectured for fourteen years and also studied the martial art aikido. In 2011, he received his PhD in education from Trident University International. Templin continued to write but mostly in the academic genre. During a research trip, while in the LA International Airport, Templin picked up the book Blackhawk Down and noticed his friend Wasdin was involved in the Battle of Mogadishu. Because the book told little about the Navy SEALs' involvement, Templin looked forward to someday buying Wasdin's book. Because no book had been published about Wasdin and his involvement in the Battle of Mogadishu, when Templin connected with him on Facebook, they decided to co-author Wasdin's biography, SEAL Team Six: Memoirs of an Elite Navy SEAL Sniper. The book was scheduled for release in 2011. That same year, on May 2, Osama bin Laden was shot and killed by SEAL Team Six operators, resulting in much publicity for Templin, Wasdin, and the book.

== Critical reception ==
SEAL Team Six became a New York Times bestseller, international bestseller, and received favorable reviews from various critics, including Michiko Kakutani, Pulitzer Prize-winning critic for the New York Times, who wrote that the book was "visceral and as action packed as a Tom Clancy thriller." It was optioned to be adapted into a movie by Vin Diesel and adapted into a Young Adult novel entitled I am a SEAL Team Six Warrior. Templin's books have been translated into German, French, Spanish, Dutch, Portuguese, Czech, Polish, Danish, Japanese, Chinese, Hungarian, Vietnamese, and Thai.

== Author ==
After coauthoring SEAL Team Six and two novels, SEAL Team Six Outcasts and Easy Day for the Dead, Templin wrote Trident's First Gleaming, the first novel in his Special Operations Group Thriller series, about a SEAL Team Six veteran who becomes a pastor but is called back into the world of black ops by CIA friend Hannah Andrade. Joining them is a cantankerous Delta Force operator, Sonny Cohen. When deciding whether or not to publish this new series with a traditional print publisher, Templin looked at the digital landscape, citing examples such as Kodak film, Tower Records, and Blockbuster video, and felt that too many traditional publishers lacked a strong strategy for the future of digital. He was also concerned about permanently signing over e-book rights to a publisher, so he partnered with agent Scott Miller and Trident Media Group literary agency and published the novel independently. This marked the beginning of Templin as a "hybrid" author, publishing books with both traditional print publishers and independently.

== Books ==
=== Nonfiction ===
- SEAL Team Six: Memoirs of an Elite Navy SEAL Sniper (2011)

=== Young adult ===
- I am a SEAL Team Six Warrior (2012)

=== SEAL Team Six Outcasts Novels ===
- SEAL Team Six Outcasts (2012)
- Easy Day for the Dead (2013)

=== Special Operations Group Thrillers ===
- Trident's First Gleaming (2014)
- From Russia Without Love (2015)
