= Edmond Tarbé des Sablons =

French journalist and man of letters

Edmond-Joseph-Louis Tarbé des Sablons'
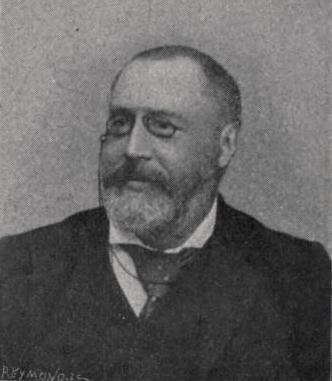
- Born: 20 February 1838; Paris, France
- Died: 14 December 1900 (aged 62); Paris, France
- Occupations: Journalist, author

Edmond-Joseph-Louis Tarbé des Sablons (20 February 1838 – 14 December 1900) was a French journalist and man of letters.

== Origins ==
Edmond-Joseph-Louis Tarbé des Sablons was born in Paris on 20 February 1838. He came from one of the many branches of the family of Louis Hardouin Tarbé, Minister of Finance from 1791 to 1792. He was grandson of Sébastien-André Tarbé des Sablons, known for publishing the first classical book on weights and measures, who was authorized to add "des Sablons" to his surname of "Tarbé" by a decree of 1817. He was one of two sons of Mme. Tarbé des Sablons, who gained some reputation for composing several operas.

== Life ==
Tarbé des Sablons wrote musical criticisms under the pseudonym "Zanony" in l’Époque, published by Georges Feydeau. He collaborated with his brother Eugène in articles for various journals, either under his own name or using various pseudonyms. They wrote joint articles of musical criticism for Le Figaro when it became a daily newspaper. He also published several novels under pseudonyms such as "Baronne d’Ange". Tarbé was mayor of Eaubonne from 1865 to 1871.

On 5 July 1868 Tarbé and Henry de Pène founded the daily Le Gaulois, and the next year he became the sole director. He held this position until July 1879, when he handed over to Arthur Meyer so he could devote himself to literature. He wrote a series of "political impressions" for this newspaper which gained much attention.

Tarbé published a number of books under the name "Jacques Lefèvre" including Les Drames parisiens (1875), Barbe grise (1884), Bernard l’assassin (1884), Monsieur de Morat (1886), le Roman d’un crime (1887), Césarée (1890), le Crime d’Auteuil (1892) and l’Histoire d’Angèle Valois (1892). He created two dramas. Monsieur de Morat (1887), taken from his novel théâtre du Vaudeville, was based on Charles de Morny, the minister of the Empire. The previous year his drama in five acts Martyr (1886), in collaboration with Adolphe d'Ennery, had a great success at the Théâtre de l'Ambigu.

Tarbé obtained by decree of 13 June 1889 the concession for a tram line between Saint-Germain and Marly-le-Roi, and between Rueil and Courbevoie, where it was connected with the tram from there to the Place de l'Étoile.

On 13 December 1900 Tarbé watched rehearsals of Martyr at the Comédie-Populaire. He had finally finished a new play entitled L’Enfant du miracle, which he had intended to premiere at the Théâtre de la Porte-Saint-Martin with a special role for Coquelin. Changing his mind, he had taken the manuscript to the Director of the Comédie-Populaire, who planned to put it on after Martyr. Tarbé des Sablons and his wife, Mélanie née Kauffmann, were found dead in their room the next morning, on 14 December 1900. Their death was attributed to accidental asphyxiation by carbon monoxide.

== Works ==
=== Books ===
- De l’usage et de l’habitation, Paris, Imp. C. Jouaust, 1860
- Les Drames parisiens (under the name of Jacques Lefèvre), Paris, E. Lachaud, 1875
- Barbe grise (Gray Beard), Paris, P. Ollendorff, 1884
- Bernard l’assassin (Bernard the assassin), Paris, C. Lévy, 1886
- Le Roman d’un crime, Paris, C. Lévy, 1887
- Césarée (Caesaria), Paris, C. Lévy, 1891
- L’Histoire d’Angèle Valoy (the History of Angèle Valoy), Paris, C. Lévy, 1892
- Le Crime d’Auteuil, Paris, C. Lévy, 1892

=== Theatre ===
- Martyre!, drama in five acts, with Adolphe d’Ennery, Paris, Ed. Billaudot, 1886
- Monsieur de Morat, pièce en 1 acte, théâtre du Vaudeville, 1887; Paris, C. Lévy, 1886
- Gigolette, drama in five acts, with Pierre Decourcelle, Théâtre de l’Ambigu, 1893
- La Maitresse d’école (The Schoolmistress), drama in five acts, Théâtre de l’Ambigu, 1897
