= Louis Kugelmann =

German gynecologist and socialist (1828–1902)

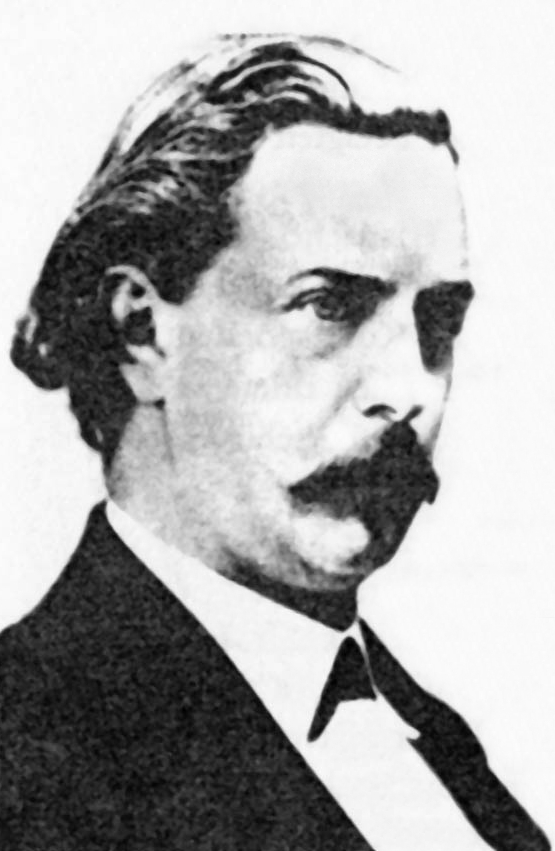
Louis Kugelmann

Louis Kugelmann, or Ludwig Kugelmann (19 February 1828 in Lemförde – 9 January 1902 in Hannover), was a German gynecologist, social democratic thinker and activist, and confidant of Marx and Engels.

== Personal life ==
Kugelmann married Gertrud Oppenheim (born 27 January 1839 in Bonn; died 1920 in Wiesbaden). They had a daughter Franziska Kugelmann (9 October 1858 in Hannover – 31 August 1939 in Wiesbaden).

He met with Karl Marx several times, visited him in Hannover, and exchanged letters with him and Friedrich Engels during the period 1862 to 1893. He was a member of the International Workingmen's Association and later the Social Democratic Party of Germany.

== Works ==
- Ignaz Philipp Semmelweis: Offener Brief an sämmtliche Professoren der Geburtshilfe. Universitäts-Buchdruckerei, Ofen 1862, p. III-VI (Kugelmann to Semmelweis 18. Juli 1861 and 10. August 1861.)
- Rudolf Virchow: Mittheilung einer von Dr. Kugelmann eingereichten Krankengeschichte. In: Monatsschrift für Geburtskunde und Frauenkrankheiten. August Hirschfeld, Berlin 1861, p. 328-334
- Gynäkologische Mittheilungen, besonders über die chronische oophoritis und über Neurosen, erzeugt durch Krankheiten der weiblichen Sexualorgane. In: Deutsche Klinik. Zeitung für Beobachtungen aus deutschen Kliniken und Krankenhäusern. Berlin 1865, Nr.14-18
- Die Behandlung der acuten Exantheme durch continuirliche Ventilation. In: Deutsche Klinik. Zeitung für Beobachtungen aus deutschen Kliniken und Krankenhäusern. Berlin Nr. 17 vom 24. April 1869, p. 156-157
- Die Behandlung der acuten Exantheme (Masern, Scharlach, Blattern) durch continuirliche Ventilation. Schmorl & von Seefeld, Hannover 1873
- Wie ist die Sterblichkeit bei Scharlach, Masern und im Wochenbette auf ein Minimum zu reduciren. Vortrag gehalten im Verein für Öffentliche Gesundheitspflege in Hannover am 25. Mai und 12. October 1875. Schmorl & von Seefeld, Hannover 1876
