= Howard E. Wasdin =

United States Navy sailor (1961–2023)

Howard Eugene Wasdin
- Born: Howard E. Wilbanks; November 8, 1961; Boynton Beach, Florida, U.S.
- Died: April 6, 2023 (aged 61); Wayne County, Georgia, U.S.
- Education: University of the Cumberlands; Life University (DC)
- Military career
- Allegiance: United States of America
- Branch: United States Navy
- Service years: 1983–1995
- Rank: Hull technician First class
- Unit: United States Navy SEALs
- Conflicts: Gulf War; Operation Gothic Serpent
- Website: https://www.howardwasdin.com/

Howard Eugene Wasdin (born Howard E. Wilbanks, November 8, 1961 – April 6, 2023) was an American chiropractor and a former member of the United States Navy who served as a sailor in the Atlantic Fleet and as a Navy SEAL. Following his honorable discharge, he co-wrote the autobiographical memoir SEAL Team Six: Memoirs of an Elite Navy SEAL Sniper, and its young adult version, I Am a SEAL Team Six Warrior: Memoirs of an American Soldier. Wasdin served in operation Desert Storm and was part of the operation to capture Mohamed Farrah Aidid, a Somali warlord. It was in the operation that Wasdin was shot three times and almost lost his right leg. After 12 years of service, he earned his Doctor of Chiropractic (D.C.) from Life University in Georgia and lived in Georgia, where he operated a chiropractic clinic.

== Early life and military career ==
Wasdin was raised in Screven, Georgia and enrolled at Cumberland College (now the University of the Cumberlands) for several years. After childhood, he enlisted in the Navy in 1983.

He served in Helicopter Anti-Submarine Squadron 7 (HS-7) as an antisubmarine warfare operator and rescue swimmer. HS-7 deployed aboard USS John F. Kennedy (CV-67). In early October 1986 during a deployment aboard John F. Kennedy, Wasdin was aboard a Sikorsky SH-3 Sea King helicopter that crashed in the Atlantic Ocean due to a catastrophic loss of transmission oil while tracking the Soviet submarine K-219 which had suffered an explosion and fire in a ballistic missile tube near Bermuda. Wasdin and crew were successfully rescued from the downed aircraft which eventually inverted and sank after a salvage attempt. He served the rest of his active duty contract with HS-7 Squadron before re-enlisting to attend Basic Underwater Demolition/SEAL training, graduating with BUD/S Class 143 in July 1987. Wasdin attended Basic Airborne School at Fort Benning, Georgia. Following SEAL Tactical Training (STT) and completion of six month probationary period, he received the Navy Enlisted Classification (NEC) 5326 as a Combatant Swimmer (SEAL), entitled to wear the Special Warfare insignia. Wasdin served with SEAL Team TWO in Little Creek, Virginia and completed deployments to Europe and Middle East during Persian Gulf War. Later he volunteered to join the United States Naval Special Warfare Development Group in November 1991 and completed an eight-month specialized selection and training course. Wasdin later completed the elite USMC Scout Sniper Course at Marine Corps Base Quantico, Virginia. In August 1993, Wasdin deployed with Task Force Ranger in Mogadishu, Somalia during Operation GOTHIC SERPENT and was wounded during Battle of Mogadishu. For his heroic actions on 3 and 4 October 1993 he was awarded the Silver Star and Purple Heart. Wasdin completed his active duty service in 1995.

=== Awards and decorations ===
U.S. military decorations
| Silver Star Medal |
| Purple Heart |
| Navy and Marine Corps Commendation Medal w/ Combat V |
| Combat Action Ribbon |
| Navy Good Conduct Medal with bronze 3/16 inch star |
| Joint Meritorious Unit Award |
U.S. Service (Campaign) Medals and Service and Training Ribbons
| National Defense Service Medal |
| Armed Forces Expeditionary Medal |
| Southwest Asia Service Medal |
| Navy Sea Service Deployment Ribbon |
| Kuwait Liberation Medal (Saudi Arabia) |
| Kuwait Liberation Medal (Kuwait) |
| Navy Rifle Marksmanship Badge |
| Navy Pistol Marksmanship Badge |

U.S. badges, patches and tabs
| Special Warfare Insignia |
| Navy and Marine Corps Parachutist Insignia |

== Author ==
He was the author of SEAL Team Six: Memoirs of an Elite Navy SEAL Sniper, an autobiographical memoir he co-wrote with Stephen Templin. The book details some of the extreme training that United States Navy SEALs go through, as well as his experiences in the Navy. The book also covers aspects of his personal life, including his marriages, his childhood, and life after leaving the Navy.

The book has been adapted into a young adult version, I Am a SEAL Team Six Warrior, released in April 2012.

The book was a New York Times bestseller and received positive reviews. Michiko Kakutani in The New York Times wrote, "Mr. Wasdin’s narrative is visceral and as action packed as a Tom Clancy thriller."

SEAL Team Six was released on May 10, 2011, only a week after DEVGRU took part in the operation that killed Osama bin Laden. This resulted in a great deal of publicity for both Wasdin and his book, which was amended to include a Preface in which Wasdin speculates how the operation might have gone.

== Death ==
Howard Wasdin died on the morning of April 6, 2023, in a plane crash at Jesup-Wayne County Airport in Wayne County, Georgia, outside of Jesup. He was attempting to land the plane after a work-related trip from his home in Fernandina Beach, Florida. His pet dog, who was in the plane with him, did not survive. The National Transportation Safety Board released their final report on the incident on January 29, 2025. It noted the probable cause of the accident as "[Wasdin]’s failure to maintain adequate airspeed and his exceedance of the airplane’s critical angle of attack, which resulted in a loss of control while maneuvering for a visual landing in low ceiling and low visibility conditions. Contributing to the accident was [Wasdin]’s decision to attempt a visual landing in low visibility conditions." The report also noted that "[Wasdin]'s tendency to not be late for appointments may have added self-induced pressure and affected his decision-making during the flight."

== See also ==
- Chris Kyle, former Navy SEAL and author of American Sniper: The Autobiography of The Most Lethal Sniper in U.S. Military History
