= Heinz Beck (chef) =

German chef

Heinz Beck (Friedrichshafen, 3 November 1963) is a German-born, three Michelin-starred chef, and a founder of The Order of the Knights of Italian Cuisine.

== Chef history ==
Beck spent his early culinary history cooking in restaurants such as Tantris in Munich, Tristán in Mallorca and Residenz Heinz Winkler in Aschau, Germany. Beck came to the Rome restaurant La Pergola in 1994, and became executive chef at the restaurant. Between 2009 and 2013, Beck ran the restaurant Apsley's, A Heinz Beck restaurant in London, which had received a Michelin star. In April 2018, Beck opened a new restaurant inside the Brown Hotel in London, following a pop-up restaurant in the same location that the chef launched with sommelier Salvator Calabrese in November 2017.

== Restaurants ==
- La Pergola – Rome – Michelin since November 2005
- Café Les Pailotes – Pescara (Italy) – Michelin since 2009
- Heinz Beck Seasons at Castello di Fighine – San Casciano dei Bagni (Siena) – Michelin since 2013
- Gusto by Heinz Beck at Conrad Algarve – Portugal
- Social by Heinz Beck at Waldorf Astoria Dubai Palm Jumeirah – Dubai
- Heinz Beck and Sensi by Heinz Beck – Tokyo
- Taste of Italy by Heinz Beck – Dubai
- Heinz Beck - Sardegna, Italia

== Awards ==
- Three-Michelin Stars – La Pergola
- One-Michelin Star – Apsleys – A Heinz Beck Restaurant, at The Lanesborough
- Golden Medal of the Artists Foyer from La Sapienza Rome University
- One Michelin Star – Apsley

== Published works ==
Title	Author	ISBN	Published Date	Type	Language
Heinz Beck	Heinz Beck	978-8886174329	2001		
Pasta	Heinz Beck	978-8886174510	2003		
Vegetariano (Vegetarian)	Heinz Beck	978-8886174855	2005		
Finger Food	Heinz Beck	9788886174916	2006	Cook Book	
L'ingrediente segreto. La filosofia e le passioni di un grande maestro del gusto	Heinz Beck	978-8804584698	2010		Italian
