= Le Gaulois =

French daily newspaper (1868–1929)

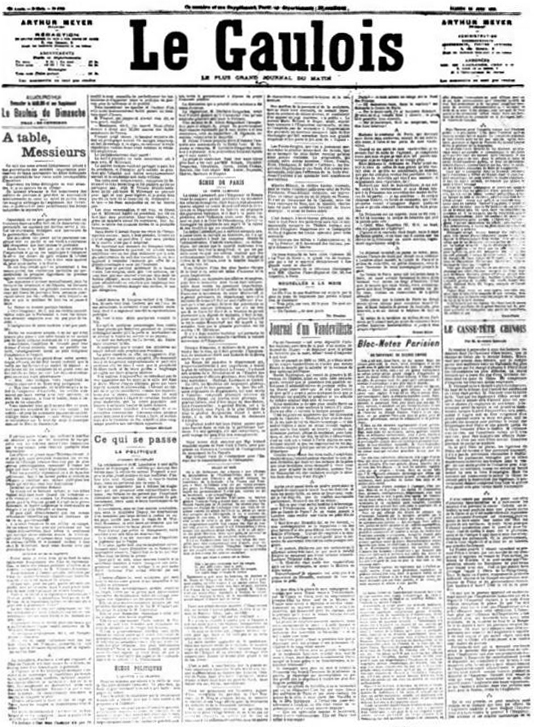
Le Gaulois, March 17, 1833

Le Gaulois (French: [lə ɡolwa]) was a French daily newspaper, founded in 1868 by Edmond Tarbé and Henry de Pène. After a printing stoppage, it was revived by Arthur Meyer in 1882 with notable collaborators Paul Bourget, Alfred Grévin, Abel Hermant, and Ernest Daudet. Among its many famous contributing editors was Guy de Maupassant. Gaston Leroux's novel The Phantom of the Opera was first published as a serialization in its pages between September 1909 and January 1910.

The paper was taken over by Le Figaro in 1929.
