= Hippolyte de Villemessant =

French journalist

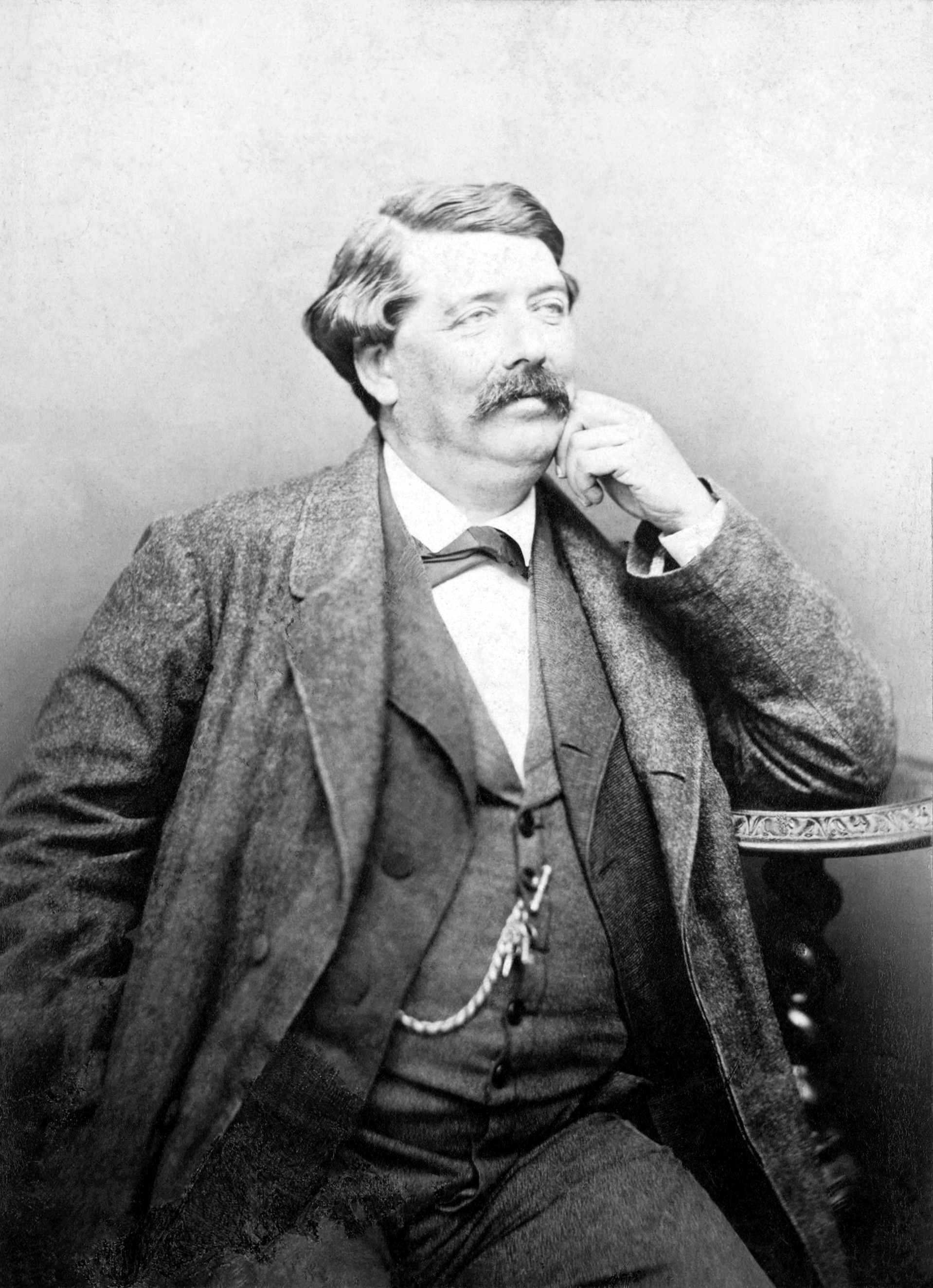
Hippolyte de Villemessant

Jean Hippolyte Auguste Delaunay de Villemessant (22 April 1810, Rouen – 12 April 1879, Monte-Carlo) was a conservative French journalist.

== Life ==
The son of colonel Pierre Cartier and of Augustine Louise Renée Françoise de Launay de Villemessant, Hippolyte de Villemessant began his career trading in ribbons. After his business fell apart, he left to become an insurance inspector in Tours then in Nantes.

Moving to Paris in 1839, he launched a weekly magazine on fashion, literature, theatre and music entitled La Sylphide, which was impregnated with perfume from his advertisers. In 1841 he set up the Le Miroir des dames, which only lasted two years. In 1844, La Sylphide met the same fate. In May 1848, he tried again with Le Lampion, which lasted three months. The journal was renamed La Bouche de fer and got de Villemessant imprisoned in the prison de Mazas. In 1850, he launched La Chronique de Paris and, after that was suppressed, replaced it with La Chronique de France.

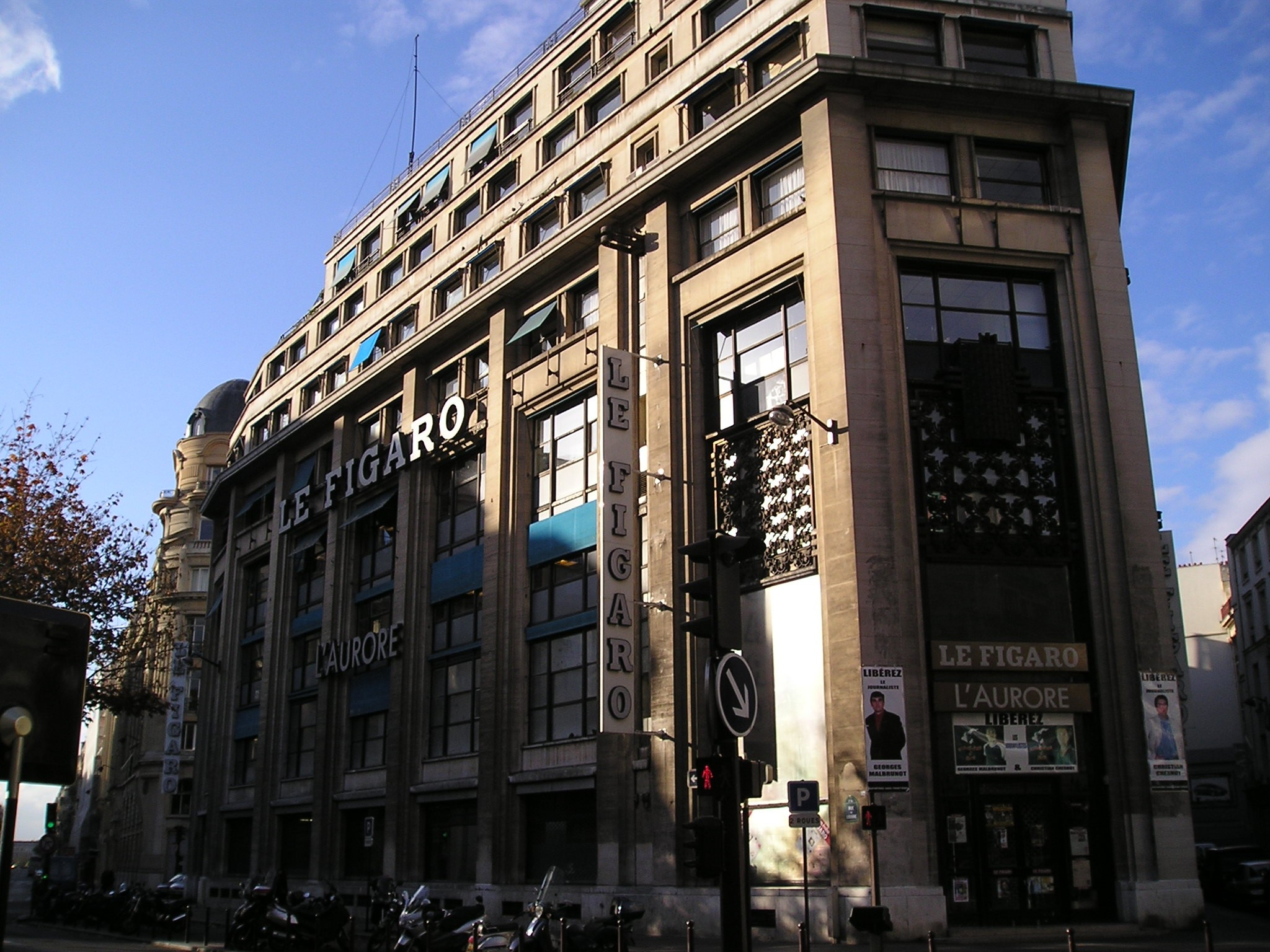
Former offices of Figaro in Paris

On 2 April 1854, he revived Le Figaro for the tenth time, this time in a weekly format. One historian later wrote:

[de Villemessant] had gone bankrupt twice. This can happen to the most honest men. He had no more choices other than between suicide and the police court. He was in this moment of supreme anguish, where a man, feeling himself lost, risks everything, even a crime. He risked more than a crime, he risked Le Figaro.

He surrounded himself with talented editors like Eugène Caplas.

== Resorts ==
In 1869 Hippolyte de Villemessant built on the côte d'Azur la "Villa du Soleil" as a writers retreat. 20 years later the villa became the "Grand Hôtel du Cap", today the "Hotel du Cap-Eden Roc", one of the most prestigious Palace Hotels of the World.

October 1874, Villemessant is invited by his friend Jean-Baptiste Daloz to hunt in his property in Le Touquet. Fascinated by the beauty of what Villemessant calls the « Arcachon of the North », he gives his friend the idea to transform part of his property into a future sea resort. Villemessant gives it a name « Paris-Plage ». Thus in 1882, came a live the first part of Touquet Paris Plage (in the west of the boulevard Daloz).

== Publications ==
- Monsieur le Comte de Chambord et la France à Wiesbaden, 1850Text online
- Les Cancans, petit almanach de la chronique de Paris, 1852
- Mémoires d’un journaliste, 6 vol., 1872-1884 Text online 2 3 4 5 6
