= Oetker Hotels =

German hotel management company

Oetker Hotel Holding Company GmbH
- Trade name: Oetker Hotels
- Type: GmbH
- Industry: Hospitality
- Founded: 1870; 156 years ago
- Headquarters: Baden-Baden, Germany
- Key people: Timo Gruenert (CEO)
- Website: oetkerhotels.com

Oetker Hotel Holding Company GmbH, trading as Oetker Hotels, is a German luxury hotel management company based in Baden-Baden, Germany. It is managed by the Oetker family.

== History ==
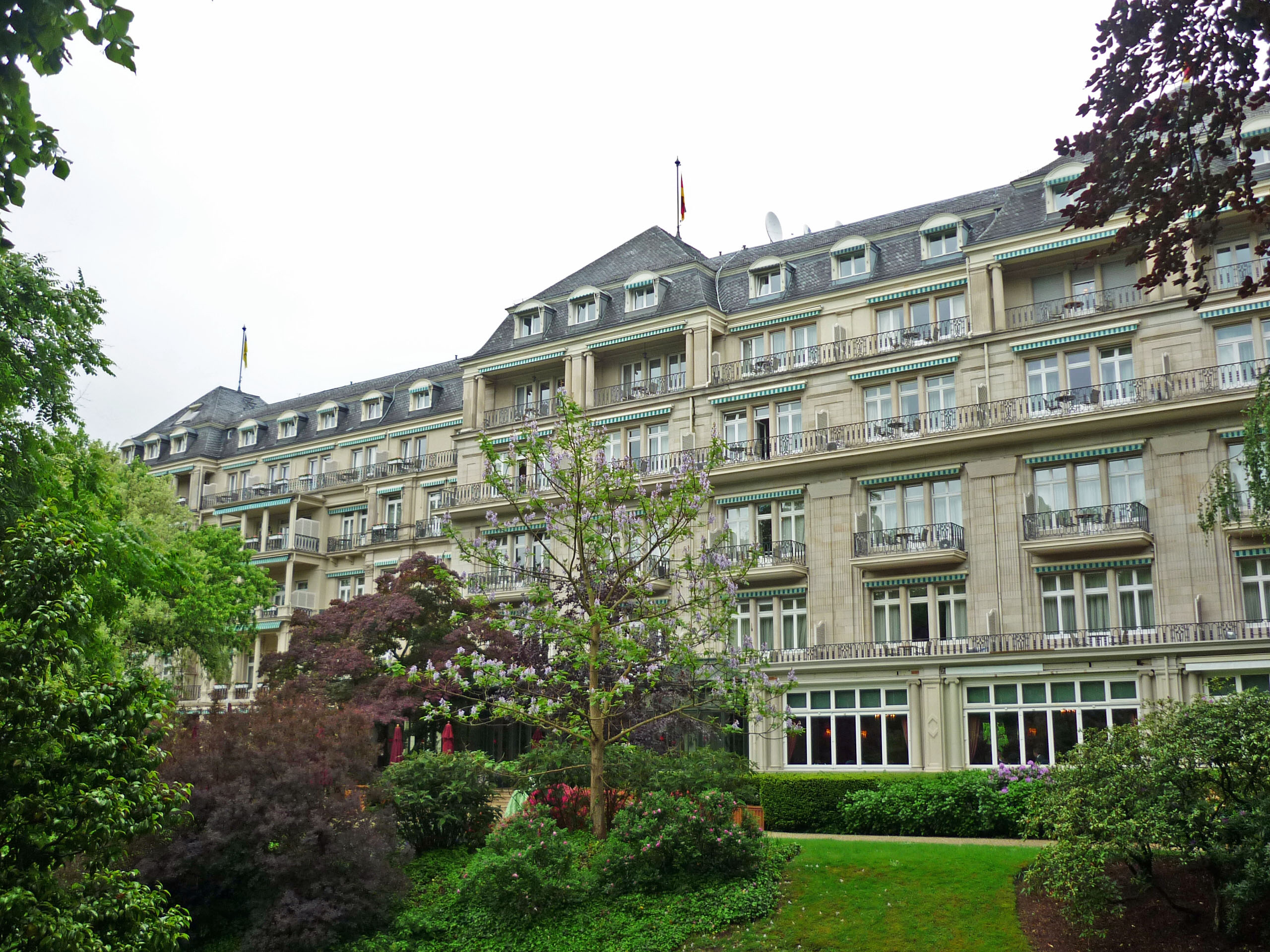
Brenners Park-Hotel in Baden-Baden

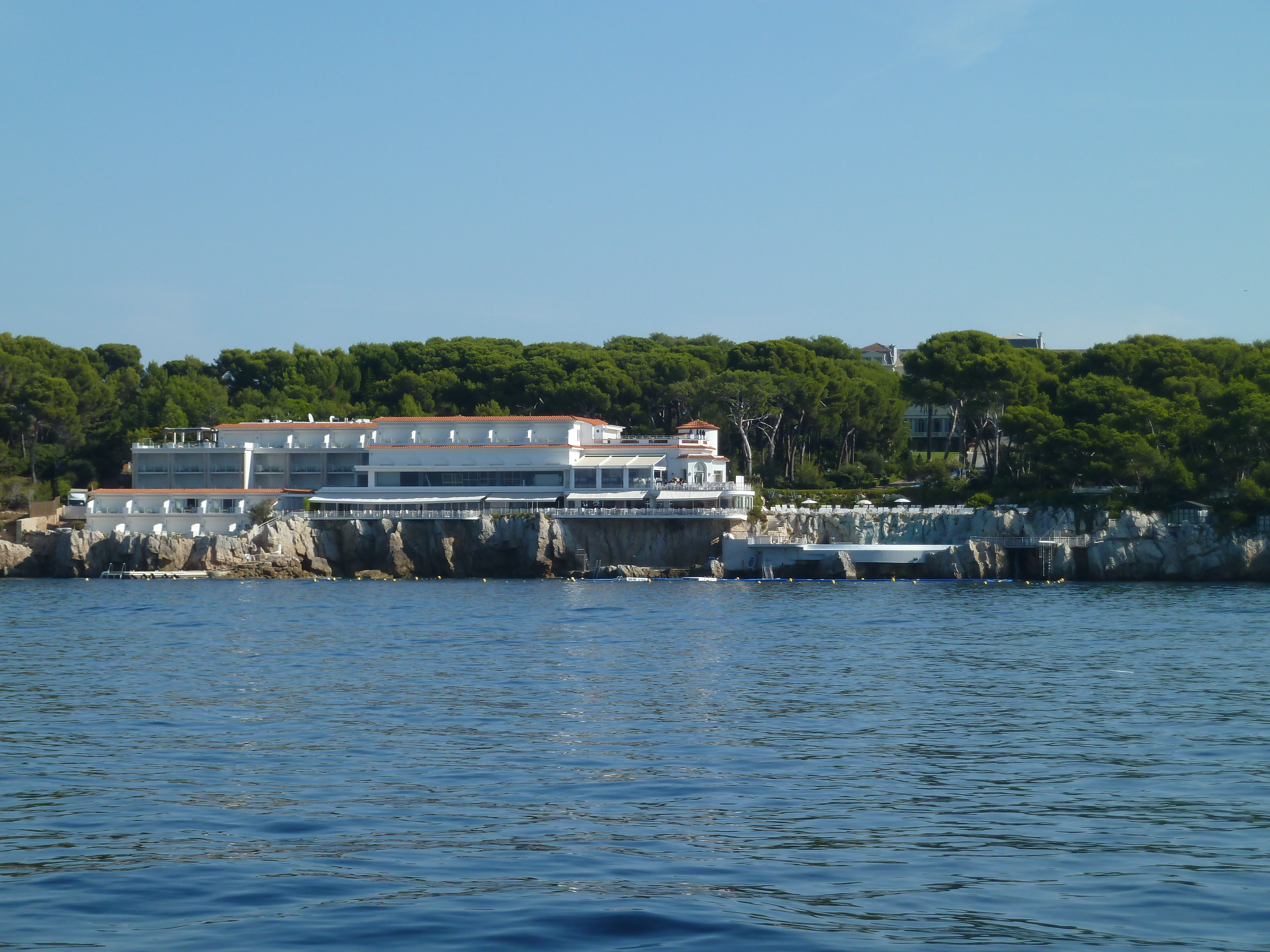
Hotel du Cap in Cap d'Antibes

The company's hospitality business first started in 1870, when Villa Soleil in Cap d'Antibes opened as a writers' retreat and later became the celebrated Hôtel du Cap-Eden-Roc. After the success of Villa Soleil in Cap d'Antibes, Brenners Park-Hotel & Spa in Baden-Baden happened to be the first "real" hotel operated by the August Oetker family. More hotels were gradually added, including the Hotel Le Bristol in Paris and the Château Saint-Martin & Spa in Vence. In 2026, the group opened its first hotel in the United States.

== Locations ==
The company runs a number of hotels and country estates under the brand Oetker Hotels. The portfolio currently includes the following properties, excluding additional private villas and residences.

- Brenners Park-Hotel & Spa in Baden-Baden, Germany
- L'Apogée Courchevel in Courchevel, France
- Hôtel Le Bristol in Paris, France
- Château Saint-Martin & Spa in Vence, France
- Hotel du Cap in Cap d'Antibes, France
- The Lanesborough in London, United Kingdom
- Palácio Tangará in São Paulo, Brazil
- Jumby Bay Island Resort in Antigua
- Eden Rock - St Barths in Saint Barthélemy
- Hotel La Palma in Capri, Italy
- The Vineta Hotel in Palm Beach, Florida, USA
