= Henry de Pène =

French journalist and novelist

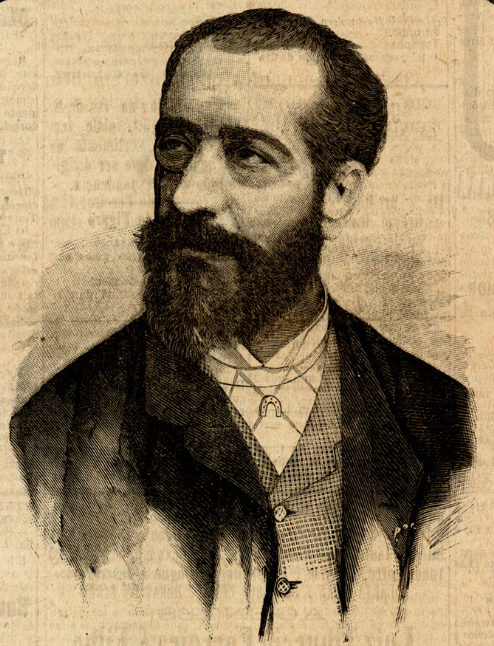
Henry de Pène (published in Diário Illustrado (February 21, 1888)

Henry de Pène (1830–1888) was a French journalist and novelist. He was a journalist for Le Figaro. He was opposed to the Republic. He was nearly killed in a duel with Robert Hyenne, the editor-in-chief of Démocratie du Midi, a left-wing newspaper, in Le Vésinet in 1858.
