= List of frozen food brands =

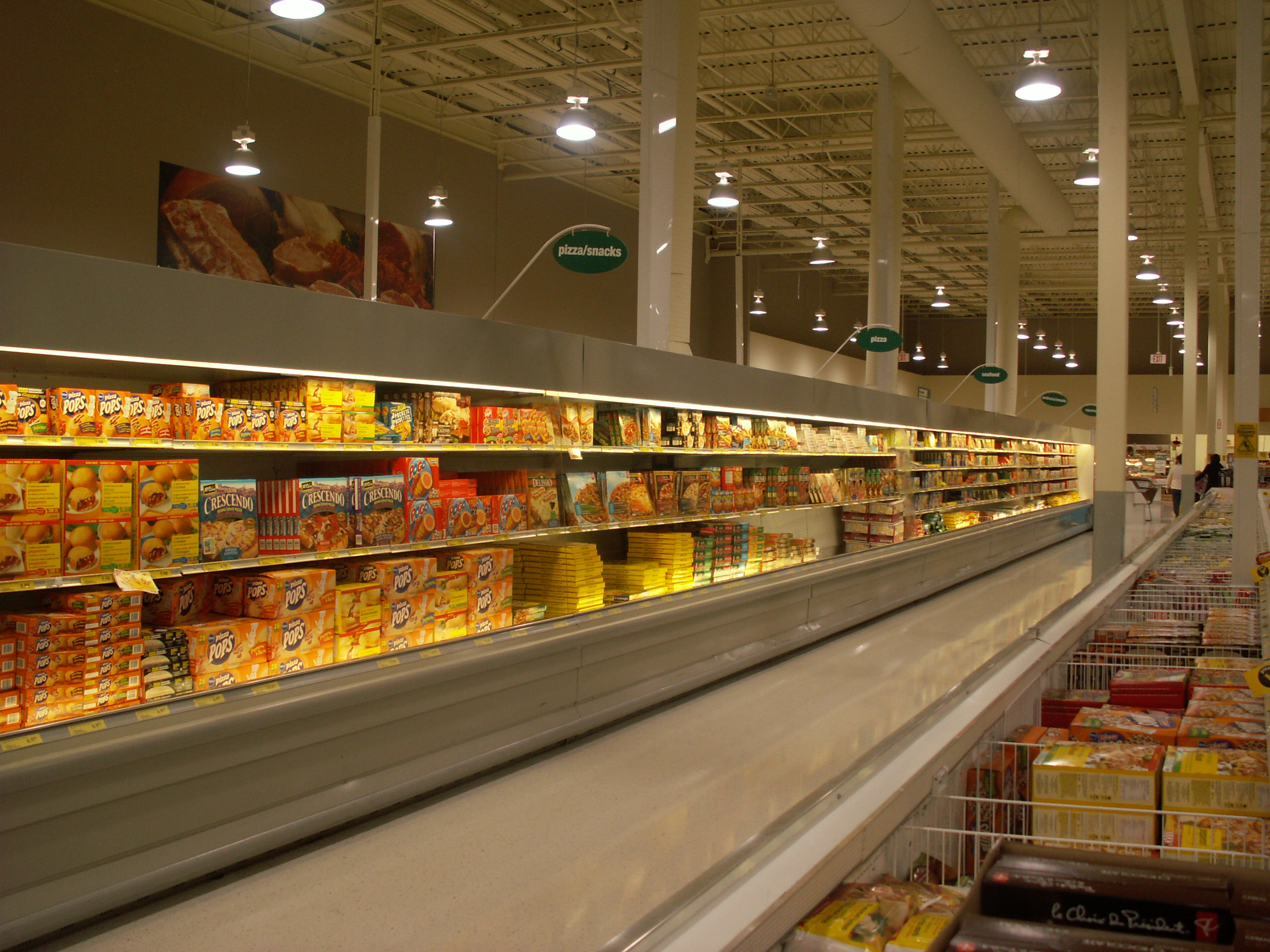
A frozen processed foods aisle at a supermarket in Canada

This is a list of frozen food brands. Frozen food is food that is frozen from the time it is produced to the time it is either defrosted or cooked by the consumer, or eaten while still frozen.

== Frozen food brands ==
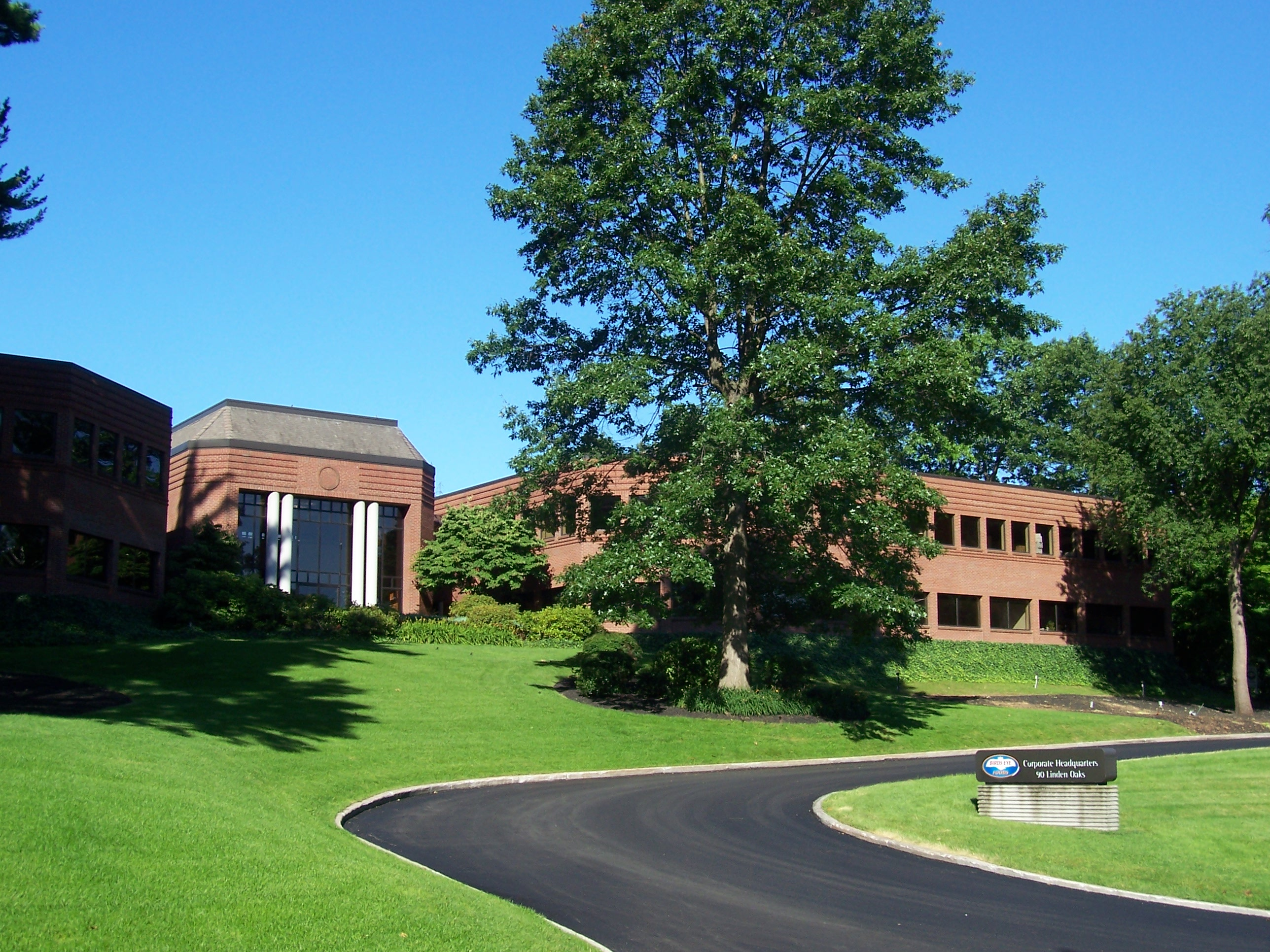
The Birds Eye headquarters in Brighton, Monroe County, New York

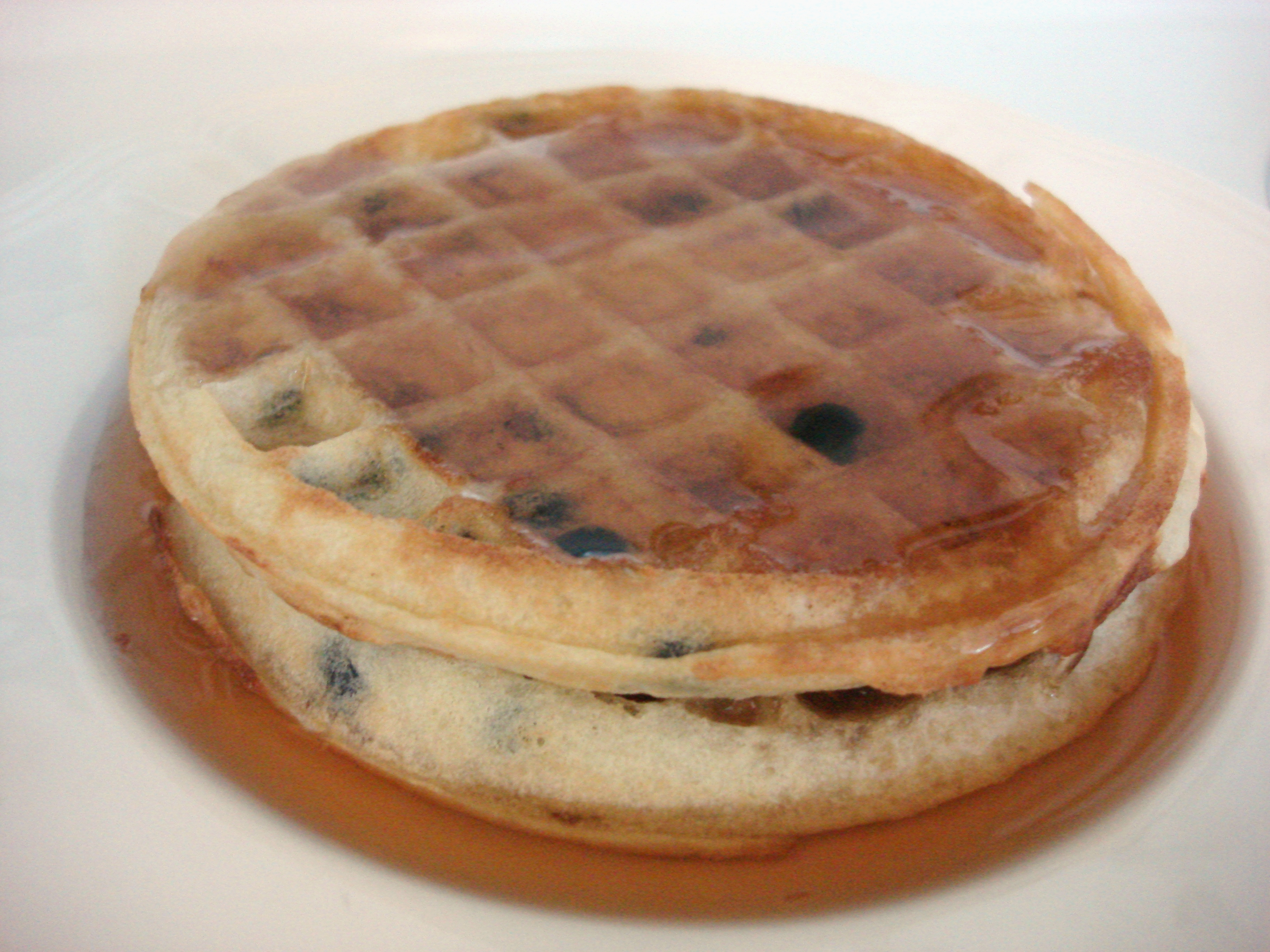
Eggo waffles with syrup

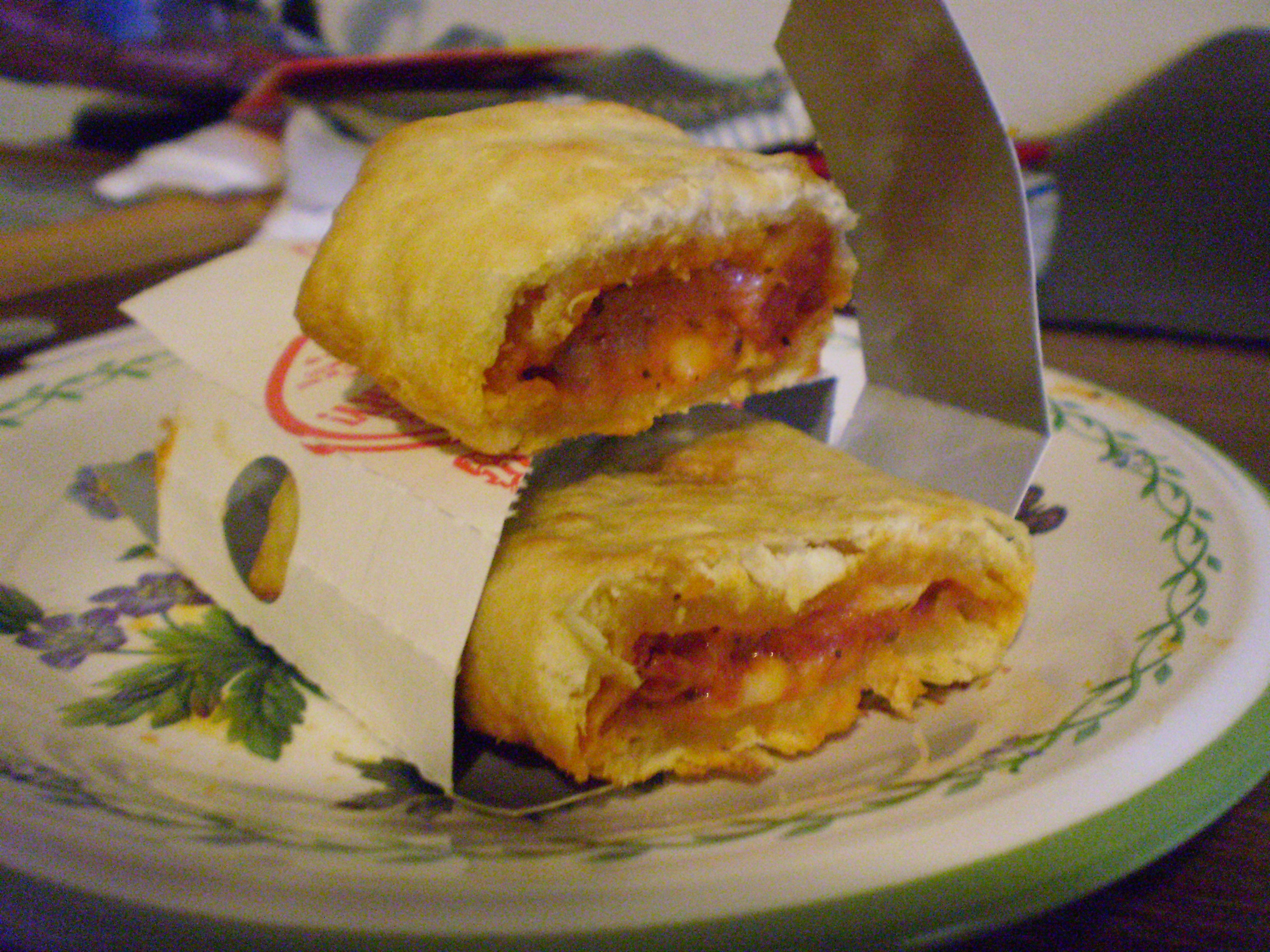
A cooked Hot Pocket, sliced to show the filling

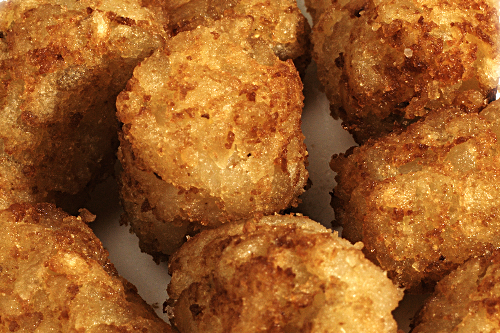
A close-up of tater tots

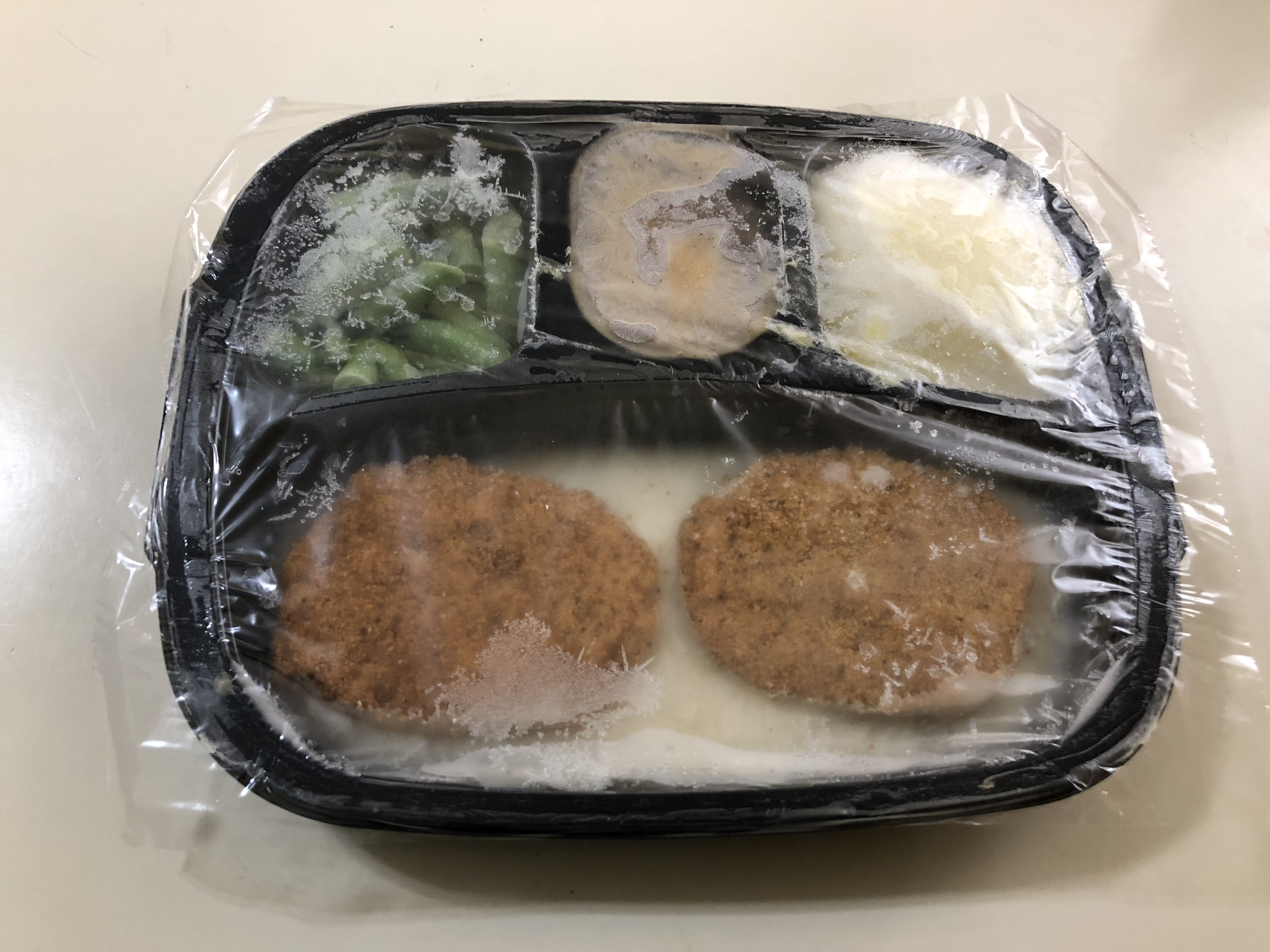
A Swanson "Hungry-Man Country Fried Chicken" TV dinner

- Amy's Kitchen
- Aunt Bessie's
- Banquet Foods
- Bellisio Foods
- Birds Eye
- Bubba Foods
- Dr. Praeger's
- Earthbound Farm
- Eggo
- Daiya
- El Charrito
- Elbtal
- Felix
- FarmRich
- Findus
- Freezer Queen
- Frikom
- FRoSTA
- Fry Group Foods
- Gorton's of Gloucester
- Green Giant
- Groupe Doux
- Healthy Choice
- Hilcona
- Hortex
- Hot Pockets
- Hungry-Man
- Iglo
- Kangaroo Brands
- Kart's
- Kid Cuisine
- Kidfresh
- King of Pops
- Lean Cuisine
- Lender's Bagels
- M&M Meat Shops
- Marie Callender's
- Maxaroni
- McCain Foods
- Morton Frozen Foods
- Mrs. Smith's
- Ore-Ida
- Pepperidge Farm
- Perdue Farms
- Ramly Group
- Ross Group
- Steak-umm
- Stouffer's
- SuperFresh
- Swanson
- Tee Yih Jia (Spring Home, Happy Belly, Master Chef)
- Tyson Foods (Tyson Looney Tunes Meals)

=== Frozen pizza brands ===
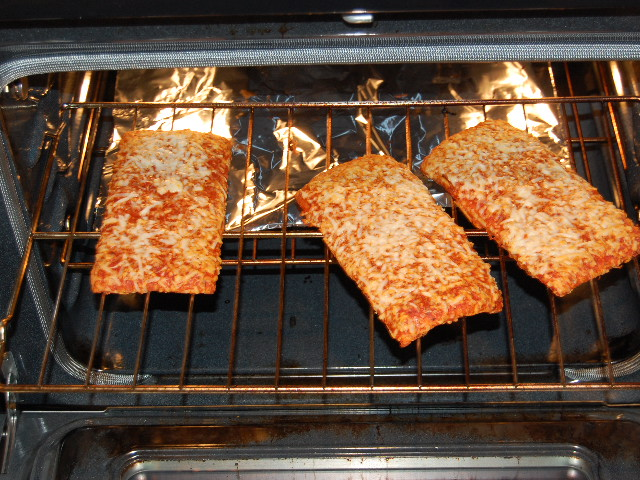
Ellio's Pizzas baking in an oven

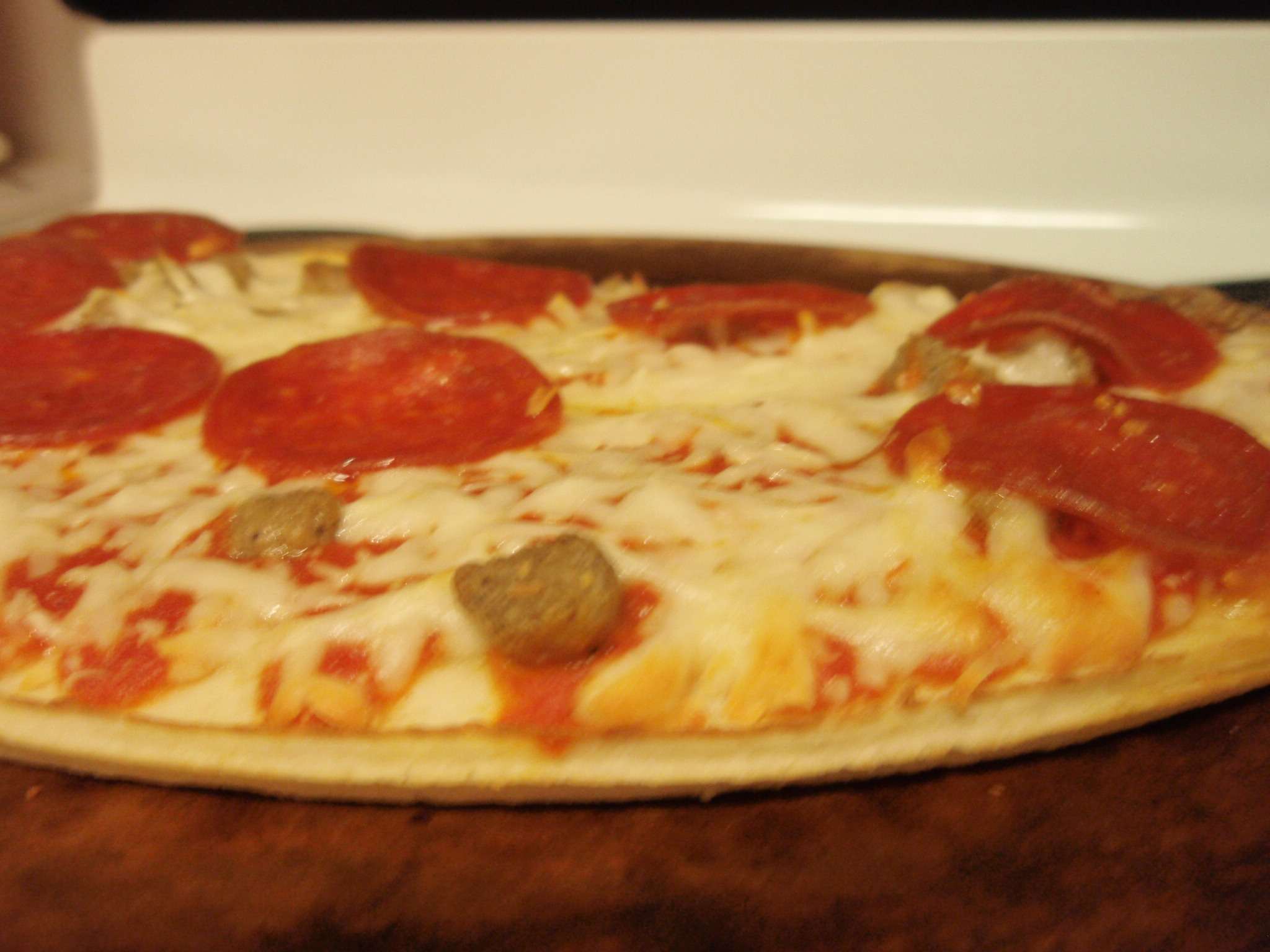
A cooked Tombstone pizza

- Bagel Bites
- California Pizza Kitchen
- Celeste
- DiGiorno
- Dr. Oetker
- Ellio's Pizza
- Fiestada
- Freschetta
- Goodfella's
- Grandiosa
- Palermo's Pizza
- Pizza Pops
- Red Baron
- Richelieu Foods
- Tombstone
- Totino's
- Uno Chicago Grill

== See also ==
- List of brand name food products
- List of food companies
