= UC Irvine Paul Merage School of Business =

Business school of UC Irvine

- Former names: Graduate School of Administration (1965-1981), Graduate School of Management (1981-2005)
- Type: Public
- Established: 1965
- Affiliations: University of California, Irvine
- Endowment: $38,965,772
- Dean: Ian O. Williamson (2021-present)
- Faculty: 115 (90 Doctoral Professors)
- Students: 2,450
- Location: Irvine, California, United States; 33°38′49″N 117°50′17″W
- Website: merage.uci.edu

The UC Irvine Paul Merage School of Business is the business school of the University of California, Irvine. It is one of the university's 14 academic units.

In addition to an undergraduate Bachelor of Arts in Business Administration, the school offers graduate degree programs that include full-time, part-time and executive Master of Business Administration (MBA), Doctor of Philosophy (Ph.D.), Master of Accountancy (MPAc), Master of Science in Biotechnology Management (MSBTM), Master in Management (MIM), Master of Finance (MFin), full- and part-time Master of Science in Business Analytics (MSBA), and Master of Innovation and Entrepreneurship (MIE). The school's Leadership Development Institute also offers certificate programs.

== Leadership ==
Ian O. Williamson has served as dean of the Merage School since January 1, 2021.

The following individuals have served as dean of the Merage School:

- Richard C. Snyder (1965-1967)
- George W. Brown (1967-1972)
- Lyman Porter (1972-1983)
- Newt Marguiles (1983-1988)
- Dennis J. Aigner (1988-1997)
- David H. Blake (1997-2002)
- Jone L. Pearce (interim dean, 2002-2004)
- Andrew J. Policano (August 2004-June 2013)
- Rajeev Tyagi (interim dean, 2013-2014)
- Eric Spangenberg (June 2014-December 2020)
- Ian O. Williamson (2021-present)

== History ==
The school originated as the Graduate School of Administration in 1965, offering graduate degrees in Master of Science in Administration, Master of Public Administration, and Master of Business and Public Administration. In 1981, the school changed its name to the Graduate School of Management and offered its Master of Business Administration degree. In 1987, the school earned its accreditation from the Association to Advance Collegiate Schools of Business (AACSB) accreditation, which it has continuously maintained. In 2005, the Graduate School of Management officially changed its name to the Paul Merage School of Business after entrepreneur and Orange County philanthropist Paul Merage donated $30 million to the school. In the same year, the alumni network reached 5,000. In 2007, the school announced that it would offer undergraduate courses starting in fall 2008.

== Academic programs ==
The Merage School offers numerous degree and certificate programs. Along with classroom learning, the school offers experiential learning and internships hosted by local employers.

=== Centers ===
The school’s Centers provide academic programming, resources, and events relating to specific industries. As of 2025, the school hosts six Centers:

- Beall Center for Innovation and Entrepreneurship
- Center for Digital Transformation
- Center for Global Leadership
- Center for Health Care Management and Policy
- Todd and Lisa Hallbrook Center for Investment and Wealth Management
- Center for Real Estate

== Notable alumni ==
As of 2025, the school has 18,577 alumni. Notable alumni include:

- Diana Ramos, Surgeon General of California.
- Greg Autry, space advocate and author
- Jillian Kraus, water polo player
- Luis Villalobos, investor
- Leon J. LaPorte, retired United States Army general

== Rankings ==
Business school rankings

United States
- QS MBA: 66
- Bloomberg MBA: 45
- USNWR MBA: 43

Global
- QS MBA: 191–200

== See also ==
- List of business schools in the United States
- Merage family
