= Paul Merage =

American billionaire businessman (born 1943)

- Born: 1943 (age 82–83); Tehran, Imperial State of Iran
- Education: University of California, Berkeley
- Occupation: Businessman
- Known for: Co-founder and CEO of Chef America Inc.
- Spouse: Elisabeth (Lilly) Merage
- Children: Richard, Michelle and Lauren

Paul Merage (born 1943) is an Iranian-born American billionaire businessman who co-founded Chef America Inc., the company that popularized the microwavable frozen snack Hot Pockets. In 2015, his net worth was estimated at $1.8 billion.

== Biography ==
Merage was born in Iran in 1943. He was the son of Katherine and Andre Merage. He has four siblings: Louise, Camron, David, and Lin. His father ran an import/export business in France before he was forced to flee back to Iran prior to World War II. He attended Alborz High School in Tehran.

In 1961, at the age of 17, he immigrated to the United States to attend the University of California, Berkeley, where he earned a B.A. in economics and an M.B.A.

After college, he worked for nine years in a succession of increasing responsibilities in product management at General Foods (now Kraft Heinz Company), Hunt Wesson and Specialty Foods where he was director of new products. In 1977, he founded Chef America, Inc. with his younger brother David. Initially, Paul Merage had to obtain three mortgages on his home to fund the business. When the company ran out of initial funding the brothers also had to borrow money from their parents. Chef America started by selling frozen Belgian waffles - then largely unfamiliar in the United States - to restaurants as they were difficult to cook. In 1977, the company had $12 million in sales and was the largest mass-producer of frozen Belgian waffles in the US.

In 1983, he noticed that as more women entered the work force there was a newly emerging need for a hot meal or snack that children could easily prepare themselves when returning from school. This demographic trend coincided with the development of microwave oven for home use. Even though microwave ovens did not have widespread distribution in US households in 1983, Merage correctly predicted that microwave oven usage would continue to grow exponentially. Merage developed the concept of a quick two-minute microwaveable meal which was all enclosed in a crust for ease of handling, using nothing more than a paper towel. He named it "Hot Pockets", and promoted it as the "Hot Meal without a Big Deal. " He personally led the effort to formulate this product; after two years of testing and experimentation, he developed and patented a unique process which resulted in a product with tasty fillings and a crispy crust. Chef America then marketed Hot Pockets nationally. By 1986, approximately 25% of US households owned a microwave. As microwave ownership increased and as more women entered the workforce Hot Pockets gained greater recognition and eventually became a success. In later years the company expanded the brand to Lean Pockets, Croissant Pockets and Breakfast Pockets. Merage reportedly does not like to eat Hot Pockets.

In October 2002, he sold Chef America to Nestlé SA for $2.6 billion; at the time, the company had sales of $750 million and over 1,800 employees.

After the sale, he co-founded MIG group of investment companies in 2003 with Richard Merage and Greg Merage. He serves as chairman of MIG parent companies. MIG Capital LLC, managed by Richard Merage is a highly ranked US Hedge fund managing over US$1 billion in assets. MIG Real Estate, managed by Greg Merage is involved in development and management of commercial real estate. It manages a large portfolio of commercial properties coast to coast. MIG Private Equity is a fund of funds with a portfolio of investments ranging from consumer products to technology companies.

== Philanthropy ==
In 2005, Paul and Lilly Merage donated $30 million to the School of Business at University of California, Irvine, which was renamed Paul Merage School of Business in his honor. Merage also donated $3 million to the Merage Jewish Community Center of Orange County, California. He has been an active member of the Business School's advisory board which he chaired for a number of years. He has been board member and a leading donor for the Pacific Symphony and has served on the board of the Orange County Performing Arts Center. For over a decade Merage has been a major and active supporter of El Sol Academy, a dual immersion charter school in Santa Ana, California founded in 2001 with 110 students, later enrolling nearly 1,000 students in preschool through eighth grade. One of Merage's major ongoing philanthropic programs is Merage Institute for U.S.-Israel Trade. The institute's Innovation Bridge Program has brought almost 1000 of the leading high tech Israeli scientists and business leaders to Newport Beach for a special two week business "boot camps". The "boot camps" are focused practical, best practices, on how to best introduce and promote new Israeli technologies in the U.S. to the mutual benefit of both nations. It addresses new technologies in such fields as life sciences, security, military, IT, food/agriculture and Financial Transactions.

== Personal life ==
Merage is a member of the University Synagogue, a Reconstructionist synagogue in Irvine, California.
