= Beyond Fried Chicken =

Plant-based food product by KFC

Vitamins and minerals
- ^{†}Percentages estimated using US recommendations for adults, except for potassium, which is estimated based on expert recommendation from the National Academies.

Beyond Fried Chicken, Kentucky Fried Miracle or KFC Chicken Nuggets are a food product sold by the international fast food chain KFC. In August 2019, El Segundo, California-based Beyond Meat partnered with KFC for a plant-based chicken flavour nugget. It is the first fast-food chain to introduce a plant-based meat replacement after partnering with Beyond Meat.

== Product ==
The company decided to replace chicken with a plant-based meat-like product. One version is pea-protein mixed with soy, rice flour, carrot fiber, yeast extract, vegetable oil, salt, onion and garlic powder. Nuggets and boneless wings are offered. It was released in US with prices, depending on pack size, ranging from $6 to $12.

== History ==
KFC launched the plant-based food with the help of Beyond Meat in response to customer requests.

A KFC restaurant in Atlanta first tested a product called "Beyond Fried Chicken" in 2019. The product sold out in five hours, selling more than a week's worth of popcorn chicken. A tweet by KFC after the sell out called it a "Kentucky Fried Miracle".

== Reaction ==
PETA praised KFC's decision and said that "We’re hopeful that KFC’s Beyond Fried Chicken test marks a new era for the company and that when it sees how much consumers value animals’ lives, it will work to make changes in its supply chain as well".

== Comparison with chicken nuggets ==
The Beyond Fried Chicken nuggets are reportedly better for the environment than chicken nuggets.

The Beyond Fried Chicken nuggets contain fewer calories and less fat than KFC's chicken nuggets and about the same amount of sodium. However, nutritionists say they should still not be regarded as healthy.
