= El Charrito =

Frozen food brand

El Charrito is a brand of Tex-Mex frozen foods. The brand formerly produced TV dinners. The word is Spanish for "little cowboy". The brand was introduced in 1980 by the Campbell Taggart company, who owned the El Chico restaurant chain.

Though its entrees included taquitos, queso, and beef enchiladas, it was also known for the uniquely named Saltillo Dinner, a three-compartment dinner consisting of two enchiladas (one each beef and cheese), Spanish rice and refried beans.

In 1995 the parent company became Earthgrains and chose to focus on baked goods, selling the El Charrito brand to Don Miguel Mexican Foods, now a part of MegaMex.

== See also ==
- List of frozen food brands
