= Hot Pockets =

American brand of microwaveable food

- Product type: Turnovers, sandwiches, ravioli, pizza, calzone, frozen food products
- Current owner: Nestlé
- Country: U.S.
- Introduced: 1983; 43 years ago
- Markets: United States
- Previous owners: Chef America Inc.
- Tagline: Irresistibly Hot
- Website: www.hotpockets.com

Hot Pockets is an American brand of microwaveable turnovers generally containing one or more types of cheese, meat, or vegetables. Hot Pockets was founded by Chef America. Since April 20, 2002, they have been produced by Nestlé.

== History ==
=== Chef America ===
Chef America is a former closely held corporation, which was formed in the late 1970s by two brothers, Paul and David Merage, of Colorado. Chef America invented a packaging sleeve and dough formula to keep its calzone-like sandwiches crispy when cooked in a microwave. In 1980, Chef America introduced its first stuffed sandwich, the Tastywich, the predecessor of the Hot Pocket. Hot Pockets supplanted Tastywiches in 1983, first sold to restaurants because they were easier to break into than retail stores.

Breakfast-style Hot Pockets were introduced in 2001.

=== Nestlé ===
On May 22, 2002, Chef America was sold to Nestlé for $2.6 billion. Hot Pocket products were "a $2 billion category of frozen sandwiches and snacks". Hot Pockets continued to be manufactured in Englewood, Colorado, Chef America's former headquarters, until 2013, when the corporate headquarters was merged with Nestlé's frozen food corporate office in Solon, Ohio. As of 2016, all Hot Pockets were produced in Mount Sterling, Kentucky.

== Product ==
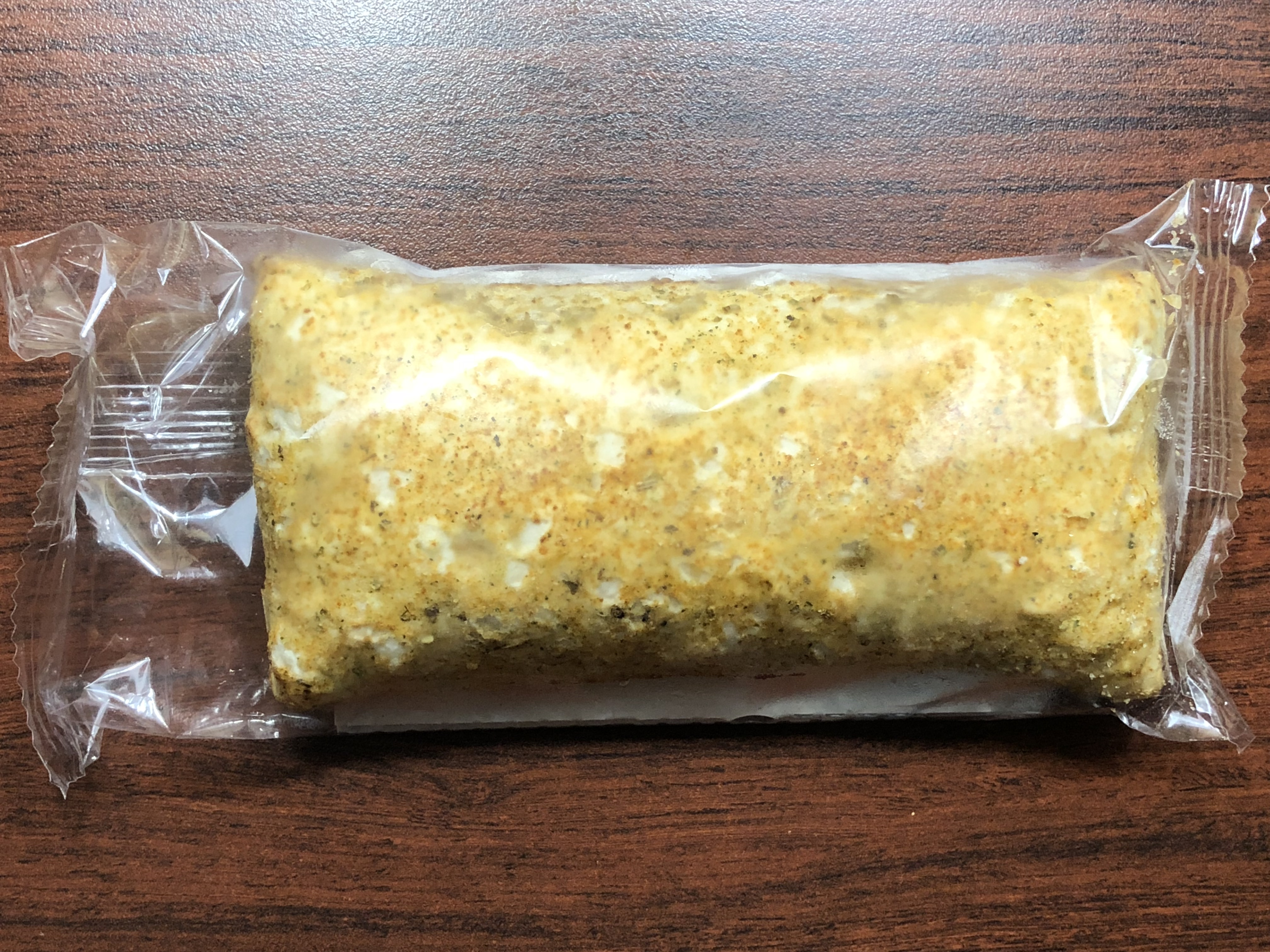
An uncooked Hot Pocket

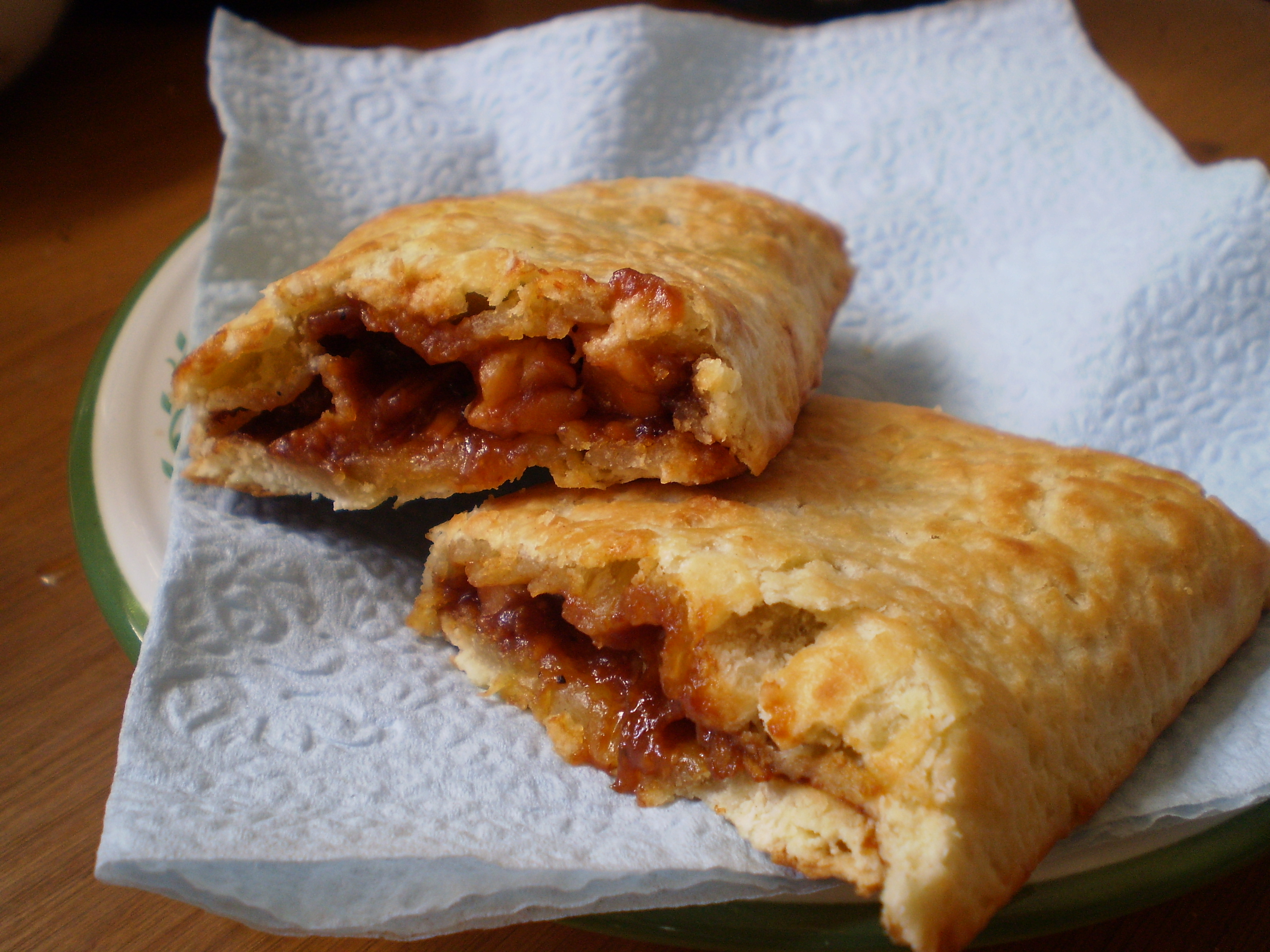
Cut to show filling

There are 50 varieties of the traditional Hot Pocket, including breakfast, lunch and dinner varieties. Nestlé also offers Pretzel Bread Hot Pockets, Hot Pockets Croissant Crust (formerly called Croissant Pockets), Hot Pockets Breakfast items, Hot Pockets Breakfast/Snack Bites and Hot Pockets Side shots. Nestlé formerly produced Lean Pockets, Hot Pie Express, Hot Pocket Pizza Minis (originally called Hot Pockets Pizza Snacks), Hot Pockets Subs, Hot Pockets Calzones, Hot Pockets Panini and Hot Pockets Breakfast fruit pastries. Hot Pockets are viewed as "an after-school staple". Individual Hot Pockets contain about 350 calories.

=== Sales ===
Citing reduced sales, Nestlé announced in 2011 that it would cut employee numbers at its California factory. U.S. sales were about $610 million in 2010 (down $44 million from the previous year), according to Euromonitor International data.

Paul Grimwood took over Nestlé SA's struggling U.S. operations in 2011. In an attempt to bolster the failing brand by improving supply chain, Grimwood made the decision to drop the calzone version of Hot Pockets and the quesadillas Lean Pockets, reducing the number of doughs needed. Nestlé executive Chris Johnson points to an end of extended SNAP benefits in 2013 as the cause of the fallen sales, stating SNAP benefit recipients are "a big part of the consumption of this particular product."

== Comedic references ==
- Comedian Jim Gaffigan is well known for his material poking fun at Hot Pockets. This material is so popular among fans that he is regularly offered Hot Pockets while on tour. Nestlé confirms that they were not involved in the development of Gaffigan’s Hot Pockets-related material.
- In a 2015 installment of the comic strip Wizard of Id, the Huns employed a trojan Hot Pocket in their perpetual war against the Kingdom of Id, with the intention of causing them to kill themselves slowly.
- Actor DJ Qualls plays a hacker in the 2003 science fiction film The Core who subsists solely on the microwaveable snack.

== Product recalls ==
=== 2014: contaminated meat ===
In 2014, Nestle USA recalled 238,000 cases of its Hot Pockets because they may have contained meat from a massive recall of about 8.7 million pounds (3,900,000 kilograms) of meat from "diseased and unsound" animals. Nestle stated that "a small quantity of meat" from the Rancho Feeding Corp was used to make Hot Pockets. The USDA described the food as "unfit for humans". This Rancho Feeding Corp meat recall was based out of a production facility in California, but the recalled Hot Pockets were distributed nationwide. The two types of Hot Pockets involved in the recall were the Philly Steak and Cheese and the Croissant Crust Philly Steak and Cheese. A full federal inspection was not performed, and there were no illnesses reported in connection to this recall. Customers who bought the recalled products were refunded by contacting Nestle Consumer Service.

=== 2020–2021: glass and plastic fragments ===
In January 2021, some batches of Hot Pockets produced during November 13–16, 2020, were found to contain pieces of glass or hard plastic, posing a choking and laceration risk. The USDA issued a Class I recall, because "use of the product will cause serious, adverse health consequences or death." Affected products include Premium Pepperoni Made With Pork, and Chicken & Beef Pizza with a Garlic Buttery Crust.

== See also ==
- Burrito
- Calzone
- List of frozen food brands
- Pasty
- Pizza Pops
- Pizza rolls
- Pocket sandwich
