= Ramly Group =

Malaysian food company

Ramly Food Processing Sdn. Bhd.
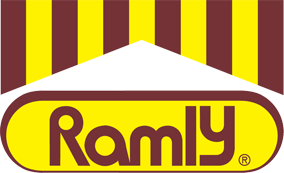
- Company type: Private Limited Company
- Industry: Frozen food and fast food
- Founded: 1979; 47 years ago in Kuala Lumpur, Malaysia
- Founders: Ramly Bin Mokni (Managing Director); Shala Siah binti Abdul Manap (Executive Director)
- Headquarters: SME Industrial Park, Mukim Batu, Kuala Lumpur, Malaysia
- Key people: Ramly bin Mokni; Shala Siah binti Abdul Manap; Siti Hayu binti Ramly; Mohd Zaharin bin Ramly; Siti Hazura binti Ramly; Siti Hazira binti Ramly
- Products: Mostly fast food such as burger and frozen food like frankfurter, nuggets, meat balls, fried chicken, buns, and sauces like chilli and mayonnaise
- Website: www.ramly.com.my

Ramly Processing Sdn. Bhd. (doing business as Ramly) is a Malaysian frozen and fast food company founded by Ramly bin Mokni through Pemasaran Ramly Mokni Sdn. Bhd.

== History ==
The company was founded by Ramly bin Mokni in 1984, with the aim of developing a clean and good-quality halal Western fast-food chain in Malaysia. Ramly started a business selling burgers with his wife from street food stalls in 1979. While working as a butcher in a market, he discovered that it is unknown whether most fresh-meat sources were halal or not, leading to Ramly's decision to produce a halal-certified meat source for all Muslim consumers in Malaysia.

=== Expansion ===
As of 25 August 2015, the company has invested around MYR1 billion to build a factory in the Halal Hub Industrial Park, Pulau Indah, Selangor, with a MYR2 billion revenue target once its factory opens in the latter half of 2017. The Ramly Group currently exports its products to Indonesia, Brunei, Thailand, Myanmar, Cambodia, and Bangladesh, and is planning to export its products to other Southeast Asian countries like Vietnam and the Philippines, and is looking into expanding into the Middle Eastern and East Asian markets.

== Products ==
=== Ramly Burger ===
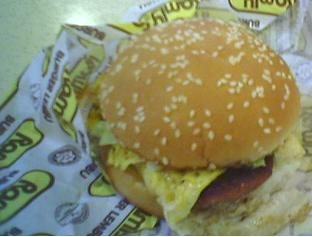
An original beef Ramly Burger Special.

Aside from producing burger meat and other frozen foods, the company is also known for its street stalls, which have sold the Ramly Burger in every state in Malaysia since 1979. The defining characteristic of a Ramly Burger is the patty itself wrapped in an omelette and topped with several condiments, which may include ketchup, mayonnaise, chili sauce, Maggi seasoning, and/or Worcestershire sauce, depending on the vendor. The term "Ramly Burger" has been used as a genericized trademark for similarly-prepared burgers which are not necessarily made with the Ramly beef patty as well. They are considered a local favourite, especially by city dwellers. It is estimated that there are over 25,000 Ramly Burger stalls nationwide as of 2015, with the monthly average income of about RM 5,000.

The burger patties have been banned in Singapore due to the meat coming from sources which are not on the list of Commercial Food Imports for Meats approved by the Agri-Food and Veterinary Authority of Singapore, meaning it could pose a potential health risk. However, Singaporean street vendors continue to use the Ramly Burger wrapper.

== Slogans ==
- Pastikan Ramly Baru Beli

== See also ==
- Fast food
- Franchising
- Hamburger
- Islamic dietary laws
- List of frozen food brands
