= Palermo's Pizza =

American frozen pizza manufacturer

- Type: Privately Held
- Industry: Food & Beverage
- Founded: 1964
- Headquarters: Milwaukee, Wisconsin
- Key people: Giacomo Fallucca, CEO
- Products: Frozen Pizzas
- Website: www.palermospizza.com www.stockpalermos.com

Palermo's Pizza is a frozen pizza manufacturer, headquartered in Milwaukee that makes a number of branded products including: Palermo's Primo Thin, Palermo's Neighborhood Pizzeria, Screamin' Sicilian, Urban Pie Pizza Co. and Connie's Pizza, as well as a number of private label products.

== History ==
Palermo’s founders, Gaspare (Jack) Fallucca and his wife, Zina, immigrated to the U.S. They settled in Milwaukee and had three sons, Peter, Giacomo, and Angelo.

The company began in 1964 as an Italian bakery on Milwaukee's East Side. Initially selling Italian breads, cookies, and cannoli, they later added Italian soups and sandwiches. Soon they acquired the hardware store next door and expanded.

Jack and Zina opened a pizzeria & restaurant in 1969. A local grocery store owner, impressed with their Pizza products, urged Jack and Zina to go into the frozen food business.

The company began making frozen Pizza and Pizza bread in an old bakery that was renovated into a manufacturing facility in 1979. These Pizzas and Pizza breads were sold under the Palermo’s brand name, and Jack Fallucca soon became known as "Papa Palermo."

In fall 2009, Palermo Villa Inc. announced plans to expand its existing company headquarters in the Menomonee Valley.

In September 2009, Palermo's Pizza appeared on an episode of Unwrapped. In January 2010, the company also appeared on an episode of Factory Made on the Discovery Channel and Science Channel. Palmero has partnered with brands such as Cheez-It, Ragú, and Stranger Things.

== Distribution ==
Brands include Palermo's, Screamin’ Sicilian, Urban Pie Pizza Co., Surfer Boy Pizza, and Connie’s Pizza, all manufactured under the Palermo Family of Brands.

== Controversies ==
=== Trademark infringement claim ===
In March 2007, Palermo Villa Inc. filed a trademark infringement lawsuit against Trader Joe's in U.S. District Court in Milwaukee. The frozen pizza manufacturer claimed the grocery chain was trading the Palermo's Pizza brand unfairly under the name Pizza Palermo. The two companies reached a settlement in July 2007 leading Palermo Villa to pursue no further action. The terms of the settlement were not disclosed to the public.

=== Labor dispute ===
On June 1, 2012, about 100 or half of Palermo's workers went on strike to protest the firing of nearly all 89 immigrant workers lacking necessary documentation in what striking workers claim to be retaliation for signing a petition to form a union, as well as what they said were poor wages and working conditions.

Activist groups such as the Overpass Light Brigade, and Voces de la Frontera have supported and picketed with the strikers, as well as Labor unions across the United States who called for a boycott of Palermo's products.

On August 31, 2012, Palermo CEO Giacomo Fallucca and AFL–CIO President Richard Trumka met to discuss issues and concerns, but the meeting yielded no progress on the strike. Palermo's officials counter strikers' claims saying that the company acted to terminate employment of workers lacking specific documentation in response to warnings it had received from federal immigration authorities to fire unauthorized workers or face hefty fines.

In November 2012, the National Labor Relations Board ruled in the 5-month-old strike that it had found that the company acted lawfully when it terminated 75 workers as part of an immigration audit and did not use the audit as retaliation for the workers' efforts to form a union, but that Palermo's did violate federal law when it fired nine workers, including two temporary workers, in retaliation for engaging in or supporting the strike and union activity.

== See also ==
- List of frozen food brands
