= Dr. Praeger's =

American frozen foods company

Dr. Praeger’s
- Type: Private
- Founded: 1994
- Founder: Peter Praeger; Eric Somberg
- Headquarters: Elmwood Park, New Jersey, United States
- Area served: North America
- Website: https://drpraegers.com/

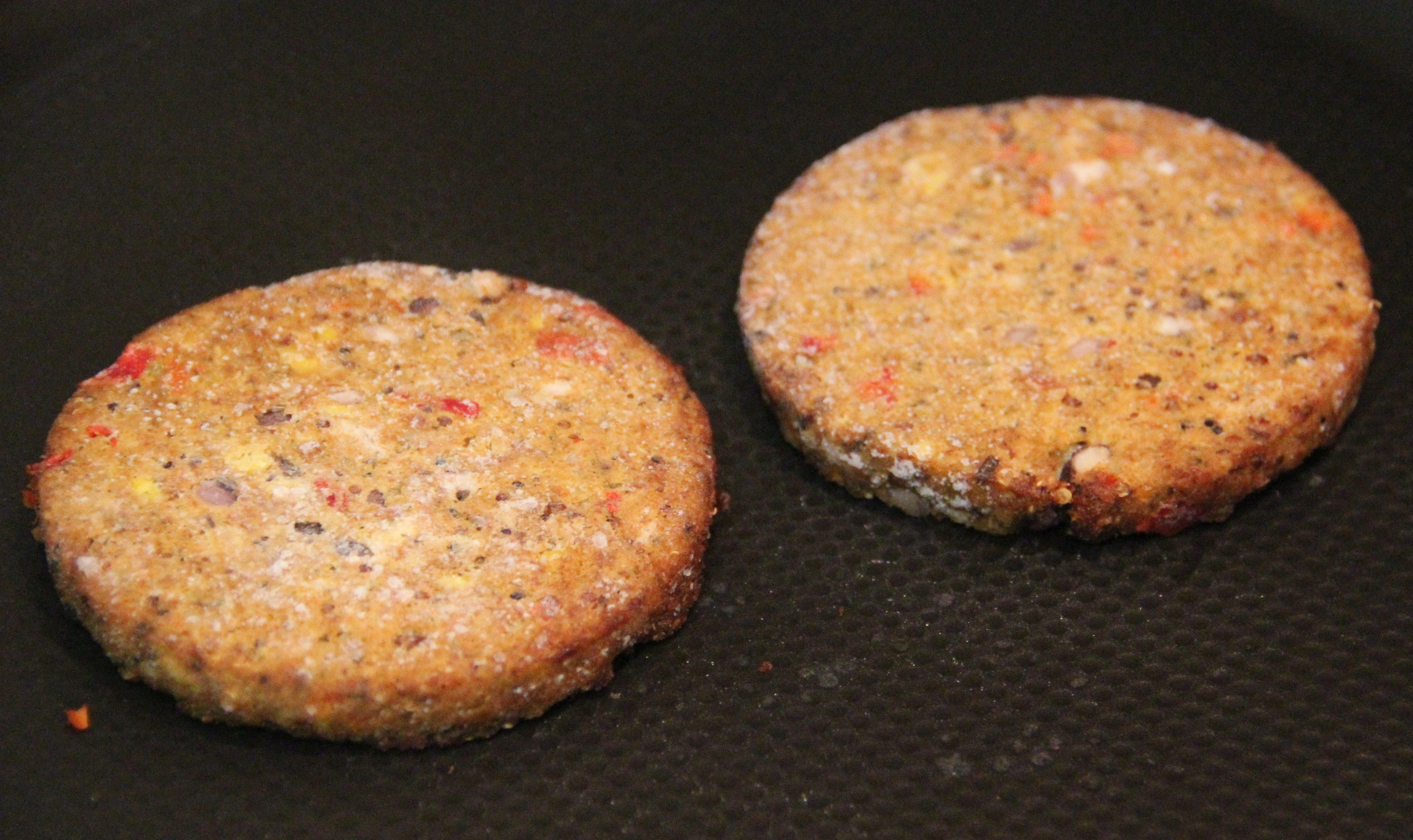
Two Dr. Praeger's burgers on a frying pan

Dr. Praeger's, originally Dr. Praeger's Sensible Foods, is a frozen foods company based in Elmwood Park, New Jersey. The company was founded in 1994 and run by practicing cardiac surgeons Peter Praeger and Eric Somberg and their families.

Dr. Praeger’s produces about 30 items in the following categories: veggie burgers, veggie-potato pancakes, appetizers/snacks/side dishes, breaded fish, gefilte fish, and kids’ products. Dr. Praeger’s products are Kosher and free of dairy, trans-fat, preservatives, artificial flavors, colors, and MSG. Most are also low in cholesterol, sodium, and saturated fats. The products are distributed across the United States and internationally in Canada, Europe, South America and Israel.

In 2020, Dr. Praeger’s won the Lausanne Index Food Clean Prize.

== History ==
One of the brand’s first and most popular products, the California Veggie Burger, was inspired by Praeger’s patients, who complained about a lack of healthy and tasty food that they could eat after surgery. After months of ingredient research and taste testing, Praeger created the California Veggie Burger, which contains carrots, spinach, peas, edamame, and oat bran.

Dr. Praeger’s also has a line of products for people who cannot consume gluten. These products include: Broccoli Littles, Broccoli Pancakes, Gluten-Free California Veggie Burgers, Kale Veggie Burgers, Potato Littles, Quinoa and Herb Crusted Fillets, Rice Crusted Fishies, Rice Crusted Fish Fillets, Rice Crusted Fish Sticks, Root Vegetable Pancakes, Southern Cornmeal Crusted Cod, Spinach Littles, Spinach Pancakes, Sweet Potato Littles, Sweet Potato Pancakes, Thai Coconut Crusted Fillets, and Zucchini & Carrot Pancakes.

Praeger, who had been undergoing treatment for prostate cancer, died on September 22, 2012, in Hackensack, New Jersey, at age 65. This initiated some management restructuring, and in late 2013 it was announced that Larry Praeger, his son, would succeed his father as the CEO of Dr. Praeger’s. Larry Praeger had previously served as vice president of the company during his 14-year tenure. The management restructuring also appointed Adam Somberg, the son of company co-founder Eric Somberg as President.

== See also ==
- Gluten-free diet
- Gluten-free, casein-free diet
- Gluten sensitivity
- List of frozen food brands
