= Frosta AG =

German frozen food company

FRoSTA AG

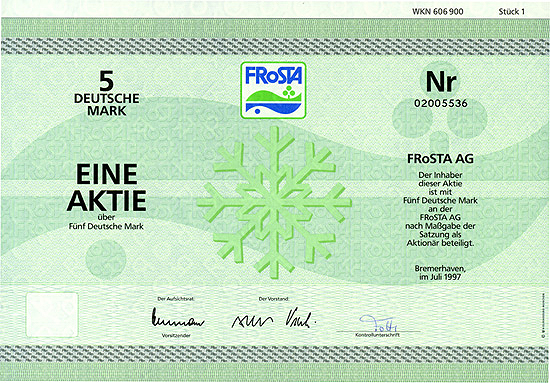
- FRoSTA AG 5 DM initial stock certificate
- Company type: Public
- Traded as: FWB: NLM
- ISIN: DE0006069008
- Industry: Food processing, Foodservice
- Predecessor: Nordstern AG
- Founded: 1905 Nordstern AG; 1988 Nordstern Foods; 1997 FRoSTA AG
- Founder: Dirk Ahlers
- Headquarters: Bremerhaven, Germany
- Number of locations: 15 (2017)
- Area served: Europe
- Key people: Felix Ahlers (chairman); Juergen Marggraf (COO); Maik Busse (CFO)
- Products: Frozen food
- Brands: List: FRoSTA; Elbtal; La valle Degli Orti; Mare Fresco; Surgela; tiko; Buitoni (license)
- Services: Retail brands Private label Foodservice
- Revenue: ▲€ 501 million (2017)
- Operating income: (2017)
- Net income: ▲€ 23.4 million (2017)
- Total equity: ▲€ 162 million (2017)
- Number of employees: 1,709 (2017)
- Website: www.frosta-ag.com

Frosta AG (stylized as FRoSTA) is a frozen food company headquartered in Bremerhaven, Bremen, Germany. The corporation owns production facilities in Germany and Poland, with sales and distribution subsidiaries in the Czech Republic, Germany, Hungary, Italy, Poland and Romania. It had 1709 employees and revenues of Euro 501 million (USD 581.36 million) in 2017. FRoSTA is the market leader for frozen food in Germany and one of the largest in Europe.

FRoSTA specializes in frozen fish, vegetables, fruits, herbs and ready-to-eat meals in three segments: brand business, private label and foodservice. Its brands include FRoSTA, Elbtal, La Valle Degli Orti, Mare Fresco, Surgela, and tiko. The private label business operates under the FRoSTA and COPACK names, with sales channels to European food retailers such as Aldi, Lidl, and Norma. The foodservice segment focuses on hospitals, catering and industrial customers.

The history of Frosta AG began in 1905 with the founding of Nordstern, a German deep sea fishing company. During the 1970s and 80's frozen food entrepreneur Dirk Ahlers bought several frozen food firms, including Nordstern, and organized them under the holding company "Nordstern Foods." He expanded the business further by acquiring the top East German frozen food brand during German reunification in 1990. The group was renamed FRoSTA AG in 1997 and became an international concern through acquisition of a Unilever manufacturing plant in Poland in 1999.

In 2003, the company became the first frozen food company in Europe to adopt sustainable sourcing and eliminate food additives. This so-called "FRoSTA Purity Standard" was planned to double profitability within 5 years, but instead resulted in the largest losses in company history. The CEO was dismissed and founder Ahlers came out of retirement to lead a turnaround. After adjustments to pricing, brand identity and marketing, net income recovered and FRoSTA became the fastest growing brand in its category by 2013.

== History ==
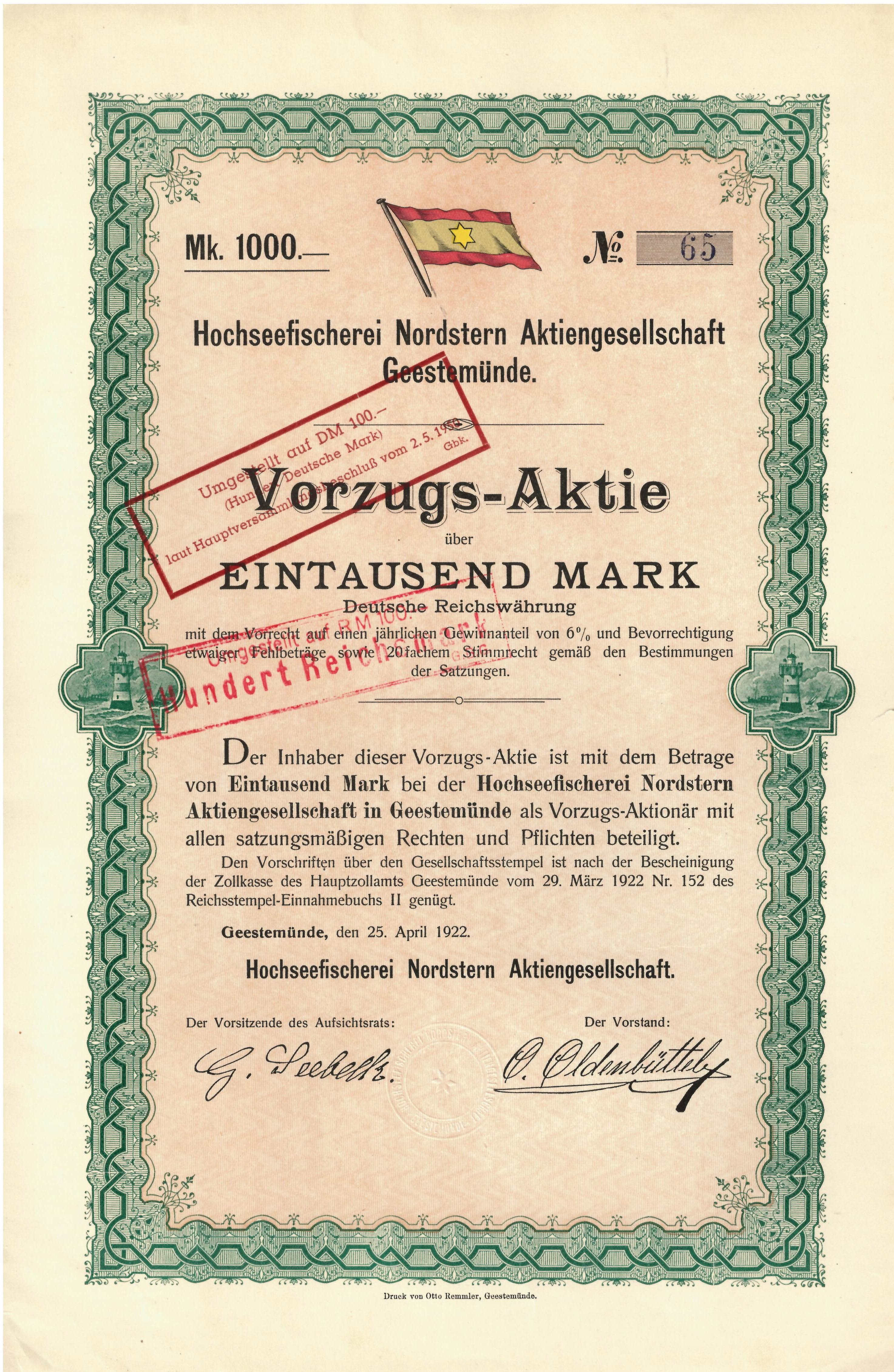
Share of the Hochseefischerei Nordstern AG, issued 25. April 1922

The origins of FRoSTA AG can be traced to the founding of deep sea fishing company Nordstern (German: Hochseefischerei Nordstern AG) on January 31, 1905. The company's fleet was based in Geestemünde-Wesermünde, now part of Bremerhaven. Nordstern survived World War I, although 3 of its fishing trawlers were lost due to mines. By the end of 1919, the company had recovered enough assets to build two new buildings and operate 5 vessels.

By 1933, Nordstern was operating 10 trawlers with a total tonnage of 2600GRT in the North Sea, White Sea and North Atlantic around Iceland. At the outbreak of World War II in 1939, the unprepared German Navy requisitioned the company's 12 vessels and converted them for military use. Nordstern resumed fishing operations after the war, but from its pre-war fleet only three ships were left.

In 1954, textile entrepreneur Adolf Ahlers founded a fishing company "Maria von Jewer". His first ship "Sagitta" was commissioned in 1957 with a new technology of onboard filleting and shock freezing, which greatly improved the quality of frozen fish available to customers. Dirk Ahlers, son of Adolf Ahlers, began specializing in frozen fish sales and founded Frosta Handelsgesellschaft mbH in 1961. He expanded by acquiring wholesale fish company F. Schottke (founded 1884) and "FRoSTA" became a registered trademark in 1963. Due to uneconomic fishing quotas, the company abandoned deep-sea fishing and the fleet was sold in 1970.

In the 1970s and ’80s, Ahlers diversified by acquiring both Nordstern AG and Rheintal Tiefkühlkost GmbH (formerly Raiffeisen Tiefkühlkost GmbH), a frozen vegetable and fruits manufacturer in the Rhineland. He merged all subsidiaries into a holding company "Nordstern Foods" (German: Nordstern Lebensmittel AG) in 1988. During German reunification, the Treuhandanstalt assisted the company in the acquisition of Elbtal Tiefkühlkost GmbH, the top frozen food brand of the former German Democratic Republic. The holding company was renamed FRoSTA AG and began selling shares on the Frankfurt Stock Exchange in 1997.

FRoSTA became an international firm in 1999 with the purchase of a Unilever manufacturing plant in Bydgoszcz, Poland. In 2017, FRoSTA bought portions of the Nestlé Italiana business unit, including the "La Valle Degli Orti", "Mare Fresco" and "Surgela" brands. The acquisition also includes a multi-year license agreement for various Buitoni branded frozen ready meals in Italy

== Frosta Purity Regulation ==
In 2003, FRoSTA became the first frozen food producer in Europe to eliminate food additives, adopting a so-called "Frosta Purity Regulation" in the spirit of the more famous Reinheitsgebot standards used in German beer production. All food coloring, flavor enhancers, emulsifiers, stabilizers, chemically modified starches and hydrogenated fats were eliminated from the FRoSTA brand - the first brand in the industry to do so. Butter replaced margarine, traditional cheese replaced processed cheese, and fish came from sustainable fisheries.

The goal of the conversion was to double profits within five years and seven million euro marketing campaign was launched. However, the company was instead brought to the brink of ruin due to cost increases and a market unprepared for early adoption of the concept at double the price. In just a few months, sales had dropped 40 percent, market leadership was lost, and the industry considered the new concept a flop. Losses became the worst in company history, the stock price dropped 37%, and employees were laid off. CEO Thomas Braumann was replaced by founder Dirk Ahlers, who came out of retirement.

Ahlers brought in experts from the University of Bremen who found that corporate change had been too radical and damaged the company's essential brand identity. While keeping the product purity regulation, the company reintroduced the old labeling, jingle, slogan, and mascot. Package sizes were reduced to bring prices below €3/unit, thought to be a critical market threshold. The company also worked with retailers to reposition products on store shelves and added new advertising to improve awareness. After losses in 2003-4, net income rose to €12 million by 2009 and FRoSTA became the fastest growing brand in its category in 2013. Today FRoSTA is the market leader in Germany and one of the largest frozen food companies in Europe.

== Brands ==
- Buitoni – prepared meals (distribution rights)
- FRoSTA – fish and prepared meals
- Elbtal – vegetables
- La valle Degli Orti – vegetables
- Mare Fresco – fish
- Surgela – fish
- tiko – fish and prepared meals

== Locations ==
- Production plants
  - F. Schottke, Bremerhaven, Germany
  - Rheintal Tiefkühlkost, Bobenheim-Roxheim, Germany
  - Rheintal Tiefkühlkost, Lommatzsch, Germany
  - Frosta Sp. z o.o. Bydgoszcz, Poland
- Sales and distribution subsidiaries
  - Bio Freeze GmbH, Bremerhaven
  - COPACK Tiefkühlkost GmbH, Bremerhaven
  - Elbtal Tiefkühlkost Vertriebs GmbH, Lommatzsch, Germany
  - Frosta Foodservice GmbH, Bremerhaven, Germany
  - Frosta CR s.r.o., Prague, Czech Republic
  - Frosta s.r.l., Rome, Italy
  - Frosta Hungary, Esztergom, Hungary
  - Frosta Romania S.R.L., Bucharest, Romania
  - Frosta Tiefkühlkost GmbH, Hamburg, Germany
  - Frosta Tiefkühlkost GmbH Österreich, Baden bei Wien, Austria
  - Tiko Vertriebsgesellschaft mbH, Bremerhaven

== See also ==
- List of companies of Germany
- List of frozen food brands
