= Kart's =

Malaysian food supplier

Kart Food Industries Sdn Bhd
- Trade name: Kart's
- Company type: Private Limited Company
- Industry: Frozen food
- Founded: 1988; 38 years ago in Shah Alam, Selangor, Malaysia
- Founders: Unidentified Malay couple
- Headquarters: Section 24, Shah Alam, Malaysia
- Key people: Rudolf August Oetker; Dato' Muhamad Adlan Datuk Berhan DIMP; Mohd Fairuz Abdullah; Choong Kin Peng
- Parent: FFM SMI Sdn Bhd (45%)
- Website: www.kartfood.com.my

Kart Food Industries Sdn Bhd (doing business as Kart's) is a Malaysian halal-certified frozen food suppliers company established since 1988, specialising in Malaysian cultures food and Western-snacks. The company started as a small home-based industry and now expands globally. It is one of the Malaysia's largest chilled and frozen snacks companies.

== History ==
Kart's was founded by a Malay couple, on 26 November 1983 and began commercial in 1988, who then sold their business to a German conglomerate Dr. Oetker in 1998. Rudolf August Oetker made a substantial investment by upgrading the factory and operations as well as introducing a food standard on the brand that was internationally accepted in food manufacturing. In 2002, Oetker sold the company to Amtek Berhad, a listed company in Bursa Malaysia. Kart's was then owned by Meriah Saujana and in June 2010, Kart Food Industries became a 45%-associate of FFM SMI Sdn Bhd, a wholly owned subsidiary of FFM Berhad. Although the ownership of the company was continuously being changed, the original company name still has been kept until this day, as it borrowed the name of the wife of the founder, 'Kartini' who was instrumental in creating Kart's roti canai (a Malaysian hand tossed layered flatbread). It had export products to Brunei, Singapore as well Canada, United States, Australia, South Africa, and now into Vietnam, France, Indonesia, Myanmar, United Kingdom, United Arab Emirates and Ireland.

== Products ==
Kart's wide product range are processed and packed in two manufacturing centres in Shah Alam, Selangor and Kota Bharu, Kelantan. These frozen food products include roti canai, pau, pizza, donuts, murtabak, crispy finger foods and steam buns.

== See also ==
- List of frozen food brands
- Malaysian cuisine
