= Buitoni =

Italian food company

- Type: Subsidiary
- Industry: Food
- Founded: 1827; 199 years ago
- Founder: Carlo De Benedetti, Giovanni Battista Buitoni
- Headquarters: Sansepolcro, Toscana, Italy
- Products: Pasta, ready-made sauces, bakery products
- Website: www.buitoni.it

Buitoni (Italian pronunciation: [buiˈtoːni]) is an Italian food company based in Sansepolcro. It was founded in 1827. They are known for their factory-produced products of pasta and sauces.

In 1985, the Buitoni family sold the company to Carlo De Benedetti; in 1988, it was acquired by Nestlé. The brand appeared as the shirt sponsor of the football team Napoli from 1985 to 1988 and is associated with the era of the legendary player Diego Maradona. In 2017, Nestlé began a brand reorganization and licensed a variety of Buitoni frozen ready meals in Italy to Frosta AG of Bremerhaven, Germany.

== Information ==
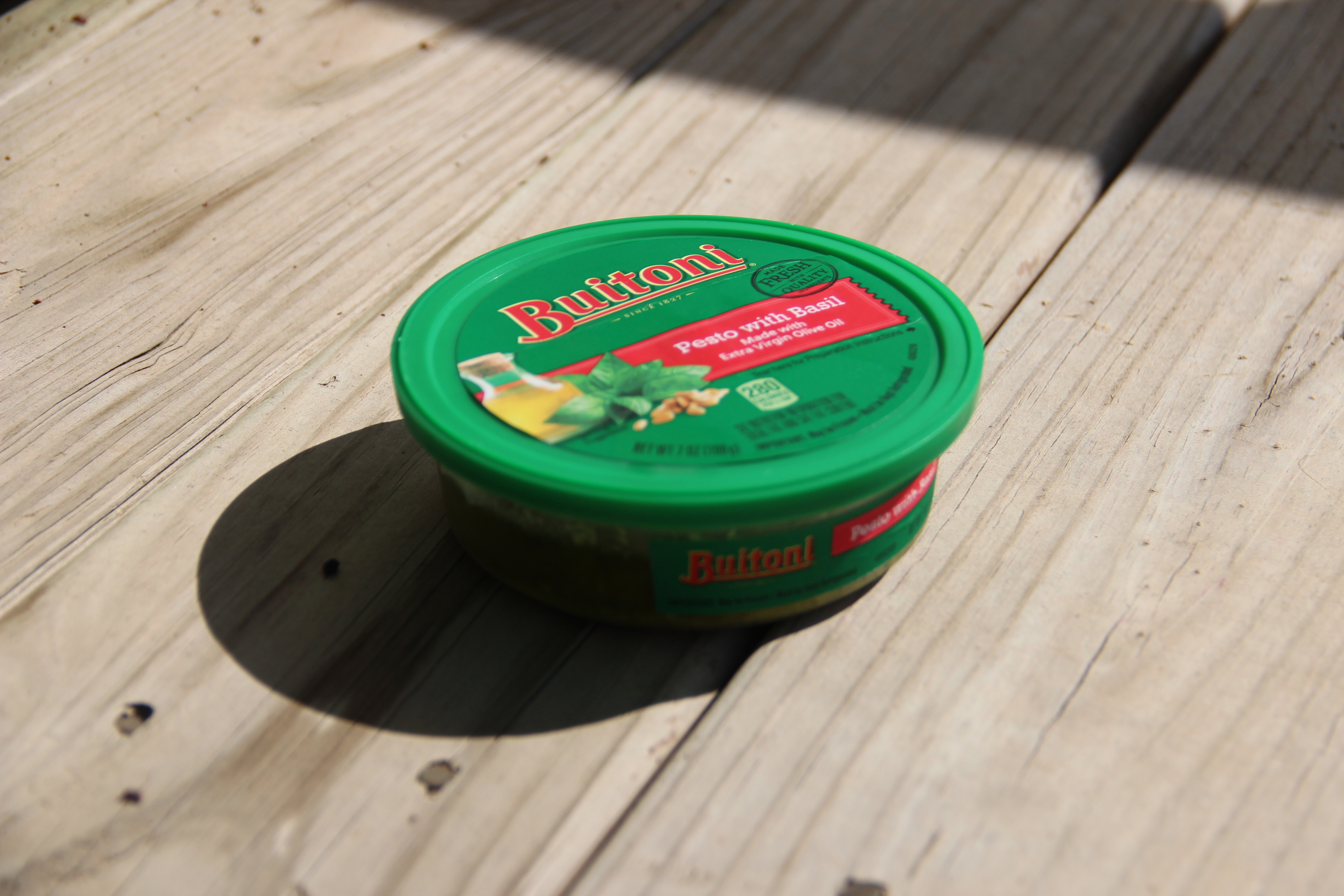
A container of Buitoni pesto

Buitoni produces a range of pasta and sauces. The company exports products to about 50 countries and offers private-label production services. Casa Buitoni is located up in the hills of Tuscany along with the fields of tomatoes, wheat, vegetables, herbs, and olives. It was the house of Giulia's grandson, Giuseppe, and it now serves as a company product development center. Buitoni products are created and sampled in the casa, which includes a test kitchen, demonstration workshop and communications center.

== 2013 meat adulteration scandal ==
In February 2013, traces of horse meat were detected in Buitoni products in Spain and Italy as a result of the 2013 meat adulteration scandal, and had to be withdrawn.

== 2022 E. coli scandal ==
In March 2022, the Prefecture of France's North Department (59) banned production at one of Buitoni's sites in Caudry. Multiple cases of E. coli intoxication reported within children across France, resulting in serious illness and even death in two cases, were linked to the consumption of Buitoni's "Fraîch'Up" frozen pizzas. Sanitary inspections held on 22 March and 29 March by local authorities revealed serious hygiene issues within the factory. Authorities stated the inspections "highlighted a degraded level of food hygiene control in the Caudry plant, which justified the issuance of an order to cease industrial production activities in the plant". Photographs obtained by RMC and testimonial from a former employee of the plant reveals the extent of the neglect of basic hygienic procedures at Caudry production site. Paris public prosecutor's office opened an investigation into Buitoni on the charges of involuntary homicides, deception, and the endangerment of others. As of May 2022, other brands of Buitoni frozen pizzas such as "Bella Napoli" and "Four à Pierre" were identified to be the cause of other E. coli intoxications in France and subsequently recalled from sale. As of March 30, 2023, the factory that produced the tainted pizza, employing about 200 people, is to be definitively closed.
