= Overpass Light Brigade =

Public art project in Milwaukee, Wisconsin

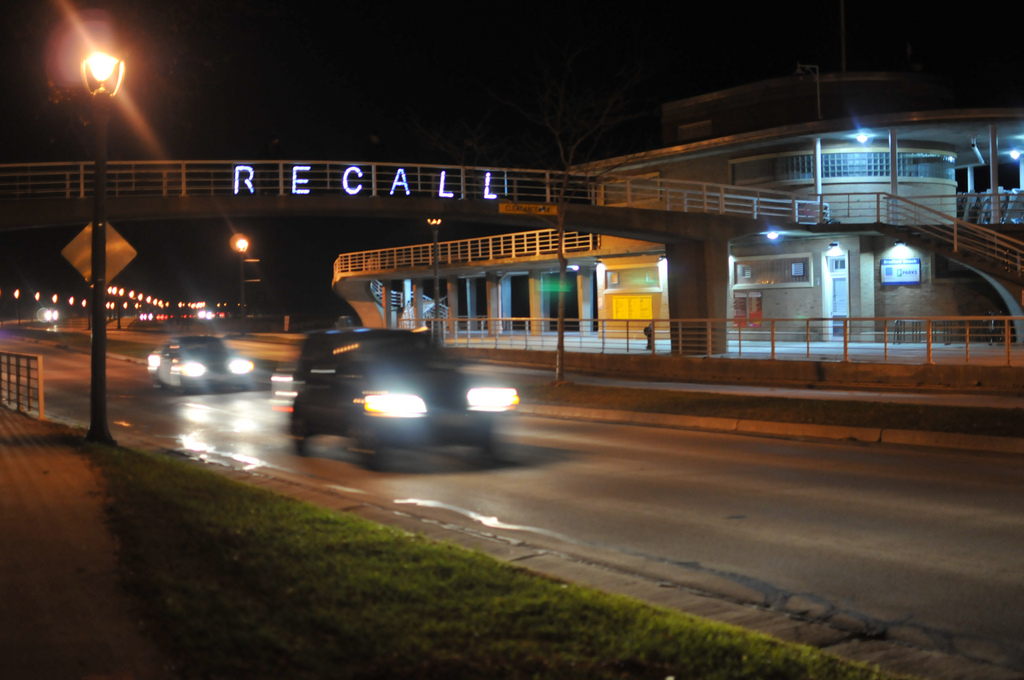
- "Holders of the Light" above Lincoln Memorial Drive, adjacent to Lake Michigan in Milwaukee, advocating the recall of Wisconsin Governor Scott Walker, December 13, 2011
- Artist: Lane Hall, Lisa Moline, Joe Brusky and collaborators
- Year: 2011–present
- Type: Electronic, performance
- Location: Milwaukee, Wisconsin

Overpass Light Brigade (OLB) is an activist collaborative public art project based in Milwaukee, Wisconsin, and organized by American artists Lane Hall and Lisa Moline and photographer Joe Brusky. The artwork is an episodic performance originally created as part of the 2011 Wisconsin protests to raise awareness about the campaign to recall Governor Scott Walker. OLB was co-founded by Hall and Moline. Brusky, a community organizer and co-founder of Occupy Riverwest, soon joined the project and facilitated its continued growth and social media presence.

== Description ==
The artwork consists of a series of LED-illuminated plastic panels, each of which displays one letter of the alphabet. Performers, known as "holders of the light," assemble in a line with each person holding one letter. OLB performances present timely messages or political slogans. The Overpass Light Brigade performs at night to increase visibility. Members typically make arrangements for performances and disseminate documentation via social media platforms.

Hall manufactures the panels in his shop. He describes his process on the Daily Kos blog to encourage others to use the group's tactics. Photographs taken by Brusky and collaboratively-produced videos are distributed by the group members and fans on the Internet. Brusky joined Hall and Moline in March 2012, to help with social media and the live-streaming of bridge actions.

The Overpass Light Brigade often organizes its nighttime demonstrations on bridges and highway overpasses. It also mobilizes members to participate in political rallies and vigils. Actions have included collaboration with national labor advocates regarding Walmart's labor practices, the Chicago Teachers Union (CTU) strike, environmental advocacy with organizations such as 350.org and Global Climate Convergence, and social justice causes, including police violence, indigenous rights and related issues. Appearances have also included picketing with striking Palermo's Pizza workers, a pedestrian bridge to the Milwaukee Art Museum, an event with Nuns on the Bus, and vigils mourning the 2012 Wisconsin Sikh temple shooting and the Boston Marathon Bombing.

== History ==
Hall and Moline developed the idea for the Overpass Light Brigade through their personal reactions to the movement to recall Governor Walker. They originally used a single panel and string of Christmas lights to create an illuminated "Recall Walker" sign, which they carried at a local rally. When images of the sign were circulated by mainstream media outlets including The Rachel Maddow Show and CNN, Hall and Moline decided to continue their efforts. Their next step was to create six individual signs that spelled "RECALL". After attempting to install the signs on the chainlink fence covering a pedestrian bridge across the Interstate (I-43) and learning that doing so is illegal, Hall and Moline enlisted others to help carry the signs as a legal form of display. This participatory dimension to the work gives Overpass Light Brigade gatherings "the feel of a celebration, with scores of people gathering on the pedestrian overpasses," according to the Milwaukee Journal Sentinel.

For the artists, their work with the Overpass Light Brigade is a "demonstration of citizen engagement... a Situationist paradigm of performativity within the contested and liminal zones of public space" and a navigation of the tactics of visibility. They cite French critical theorist Guy Debord's The Society of the Spectacle as an inspiration. Debord explored and explained how contemporary media creates spectacle that is essentially devoid of content. A founder of the artistic and political movement Situationist International, he sought, through the construction of "situations," to create multiple strategies for reclaiming an individual's self-determination from the sedative effects of ubiquitous spectacle.

Hall and Moline had a history of making collaborative work, often about environmental issues and animal subjects, but rarely pushed beyond the boundaries of traditional art spaces. As a result of the Wisconsin protests, the artists became involved with activist work, in which the use of signs was pivotal. They also worked with other artists, activists, social scientists, and teachers to set up a short-lived political action committee called the Playground Legends, and began working in some of Milwaukee's African American communities on voter education and Get Out The Vote campaigns. The group, with the central notion that public space and public discourse were necessary for functional democracy, set up "parties in the parks" for neighborhood groups, and used these relational activities to help create cohesion around a political purpose.

Brusky, a public school teacher and union organizer, became an integral part of the OLB core after live-streaming focused actions. He is credited with expanding the greater OLB community through his relationships with national Occupy networks.

The OLB organization relies on a loose network of volunteers dedicated to "peaceful protest and artful activism."

== Growth ==
Affiliated Light Brigade organizations have been established in cities across the United States and internationally, and have organized to form the Light Brigade Network. Hall emphasizes the importance for groups to consider how a collection of lighted letters can be recombined; to document the action through quality (night-time) photographs, videos, and blog posts; and to use social media to amplify the reach of the message. The Light Brigade Network includes 46 chapters in cities in 21 US states, and six chapters in Croatia, France, (Germany), New Zealand, and the United Kingdom.

== Light Brigade Network actions ==
Light Brigade groups organize actions around issues pertinent to their communities, and often collaborate on larger, national or international campaigns. Some noteworthy actions include:

- On April 10, 2014, the PEN American Center organized an event protesting China's efforts to silence Ai Weiwei and other Chinese artists and writers. This event featured

the NYC Light Brigade, holding lighted signs spelling "FREE EXPRESSION" in English and Chinese.

- On January 7, 2015, after the Charlie Hebdo terrorist attack, what has become the Paris Light Brigade brought lights spelling "NOT AFRAID" to a vigil in Paris.
- Throughout December 2015, homes and businesses in the Bushwick neighborhood of Brooklyn displayed signs as part of "Mi Casa Es No Su Casa: Illumination Against Gentrification.” This project was a collaboration between local activists, the Mayday Space and NYC Light Brigade.
- The Chicago Light Brigade has been involved in numerous projects – on their own and in collaboration with other groups – to promote social justice for communities of color. They participated in the Week of Action Against Incarcerating Youth (May 2014) with the "Locked Up and Out" Rally, and protested the police murder of Laquan McDonald in December 2015 with the "Memorial Blockade" in downtown Chicago.

== Films ==
The spectacle and "mediagenic quality" of OLB's actions have made it the subject of several film projects. Overpass Light Brigade, a short documentary by filmmakers Matt Mullans and Dusan Harminc, was released in 2013 and was screened in over 25 venues, including Woods Hole Film Festival, Marfa Film Festival, and the PBS Online Film Festival.

Also in 2013, Planned Parenthood, with 371 Productions and documentary filmmaker Brad Lichtenstein, created the "Be Visible" campaign, with a video highlighting women's stories and featuring the Overpass Light Brigade.

== Photographs of Overpass Light Brigade in action ==
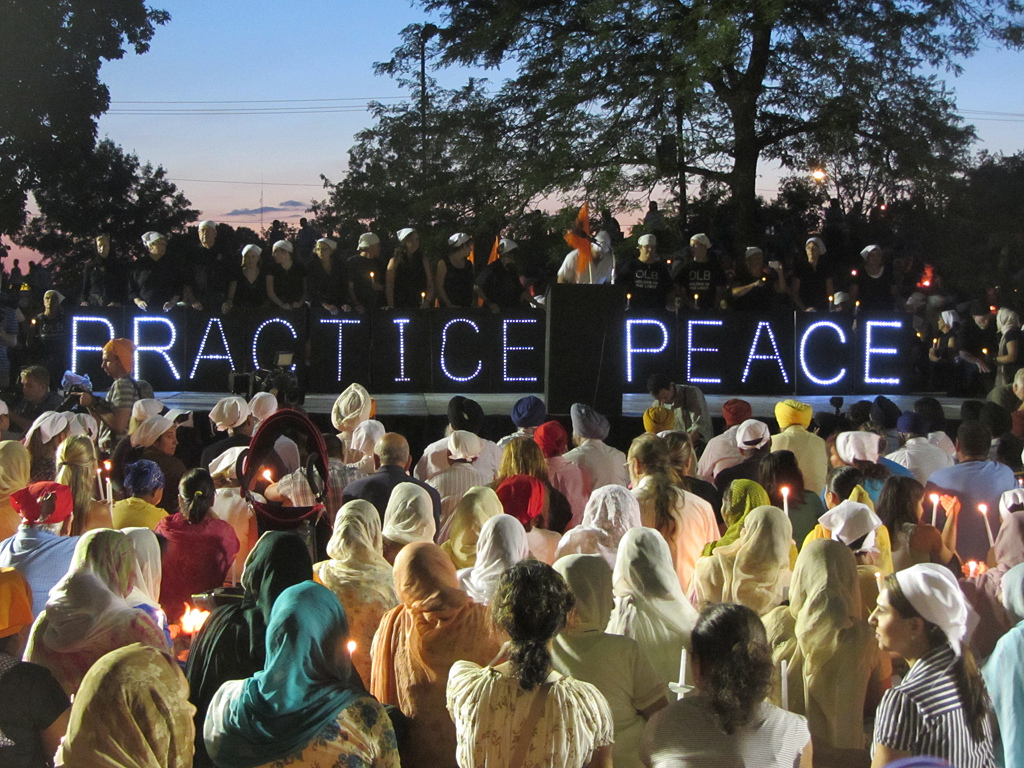
Vigil for the Sikh Temple shooting, Oak Creek, Wisconsin, August 2012. "Practice Peace".

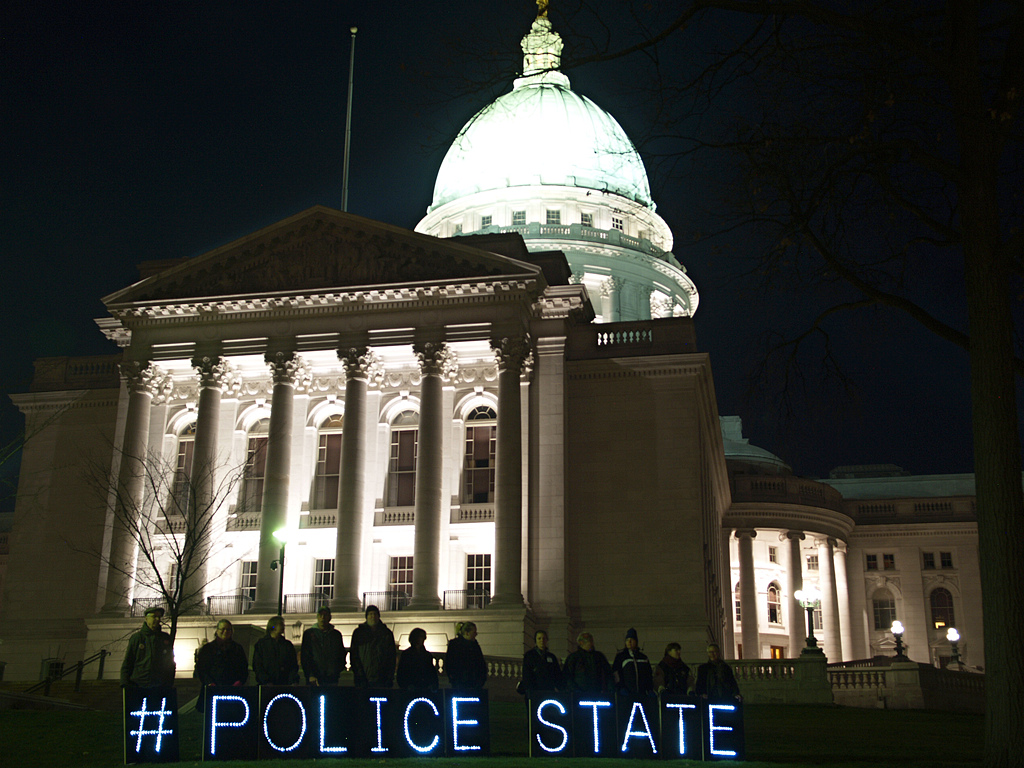
Wisconsin State Capitol, Madison, Wisconsin, November 2012. "In Solidarity with the Solidarity Singers".

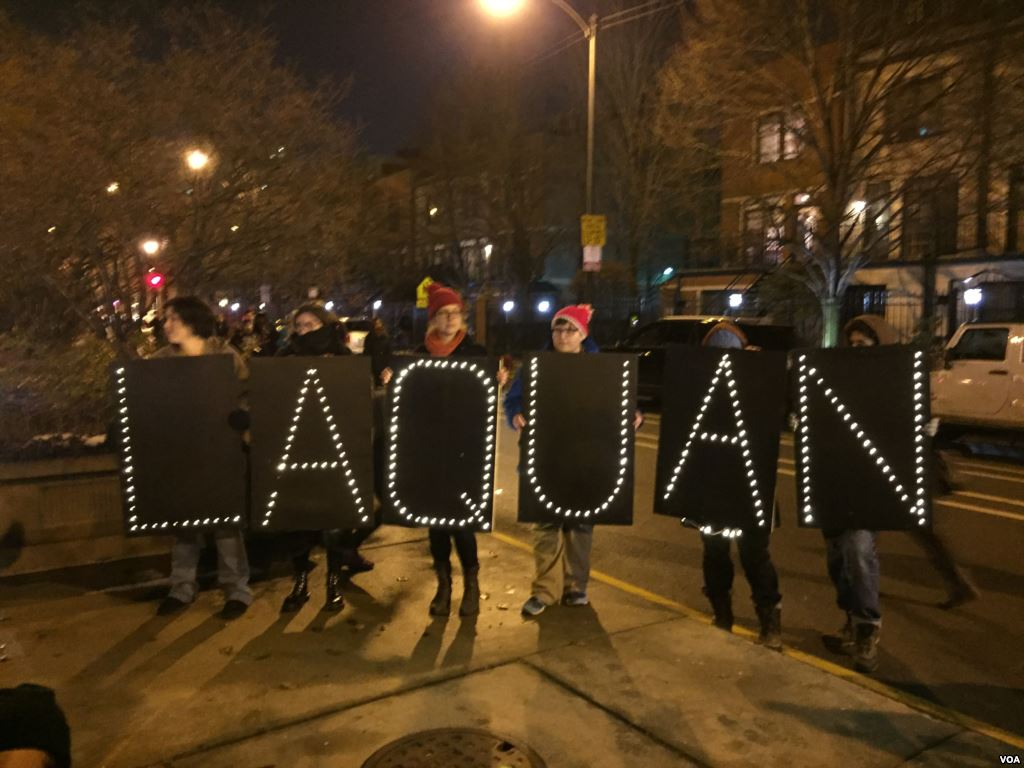
A memorial from protesters following the murder of Laquan McDonald, November 24, 2015

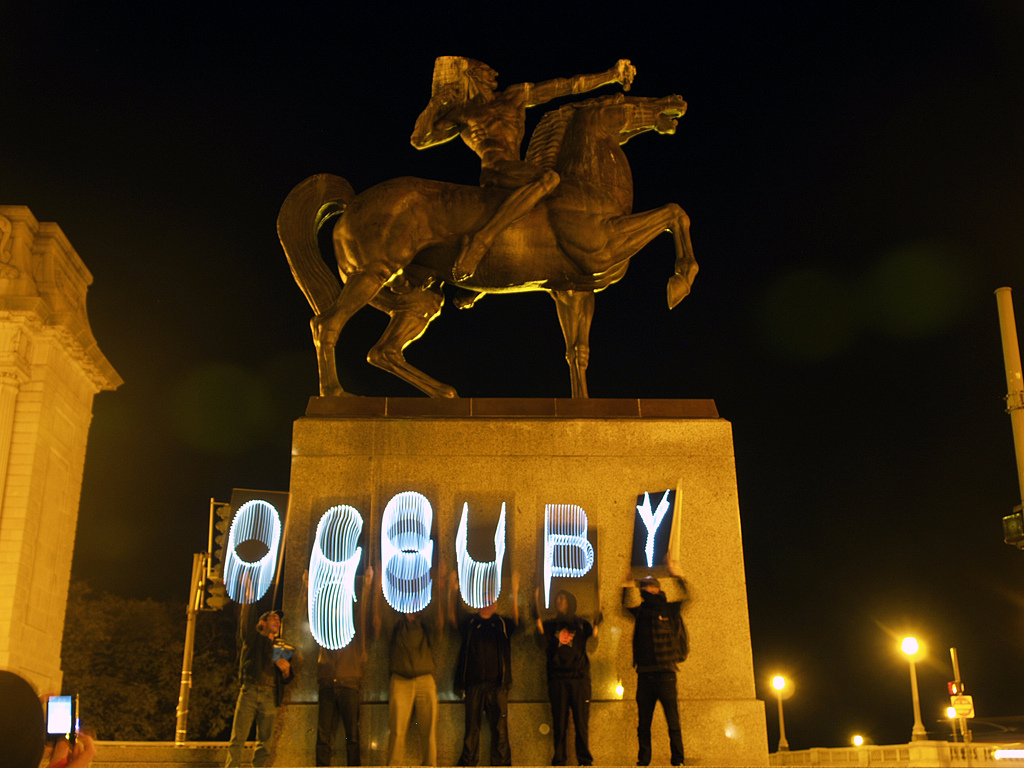
Grant Park, Chicago, October 2012. "Occupy Your Homes" with Occupy Roger's Park.

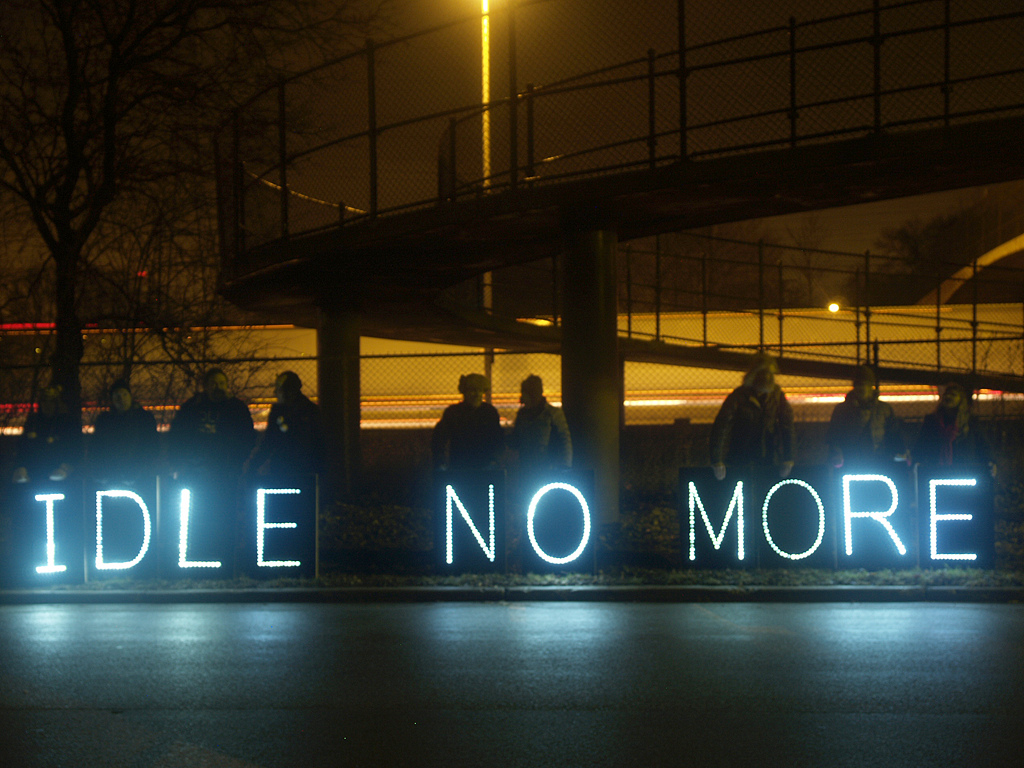
Interstate-894, West Allis, Wisconsin, January 2013. "Idle No More & Indigenous Rights".

== See also ==
- Electronic art
- Graffiti Research Lab
- Occupy movement
- Idle No More
- The Yes Men
- US Uncut
