= Pizza Pops =

Canadian commercial frozen meat/cheese snack

- The 'Three Meat' variety of Pizza Pops

Nutritional value per 100 g (3.5 oz)
- Energy: 246 kcal (1,030 kJ)
- Carbohydrates: 29 g
- Fat: 10 g
- Trans: 0.3 g
- Protein: 10 g
- ^{†}Percentages estimated using US recommendations for adults.

Pizza Pops are a Canadian calzone-type snack produced by Pillsbury. Pizza Pops are sold both pre-cooked and frozen. Typically, they can be reheated in a microwave oven. However, they may also be cooked in a conventional oven.

== History ==
Pizza Pops were invented by Paul Faraci (1928 – 2018) of Winnipeg, Manitoba, Canada, in 1964; they were conceived as a modification of traditional cheese-filled Italian turnovers such as calzone or panzerotti. The rights to Pizza Pops were later sold to Pillsbury. Pizza Pops are currently manufactured by General Mills at a factory in Winnipeg.

== Varieties ==
Pizza Pops come in several varieties such as "Hawaiian", "Three Meat", "Pepperoni", "Pepperoni & Bacon", "Deluxe", "Cheese Burger", "Canadian", "Poutine" and "Three Cheese". All varieties of Pizza Pops, except for poutine and Three Cheese, contain pizza sauce, pizza topping, and meat. They may also contain vegetables, such as green peppers or mushrooms, and artificial colours and flavours, such as Yellow 5.

Chili Pops and Veggie Pops were introduced at the same time in the 1980s but were discontinued within a few years. Chili Pops were reintroduced along with the introduction of Fajita Pops in the 1990s, but both were also discontinued within a few years.

Pizza Pops are available only in Canada.

== See also ==
- List of Canadian inventions and discoveries
- Hot Pockets
- Pizza rolls
- List of frozen food brands
- Panzerotti
- Totino's Pizza Stuffers
