= Ellio's Pizza =

Brand of frozen pizza

Ellio's
- Product type: Pizza
- Country: United States
- Introduced: 1963; 63 years ago
- Markets: United States
- Website: ellios.com

Ellio's Pizza is an American brand of frozen pizza owned and distributed by G.A. Productions LLC of Lodi, New Jersey, since 2020.

== History ==
In 1963, Ellio's Pizza was founded by Greek immigrants Elias Betzios, George Liolis, and Manny Tzelios. The brand name was a combination of the names of its three co-founders. Four years later, Ellio's introduced its signature "9 slice" pizza in a box comprising 3 rectangular pizzas, each divisible crosswise into three slices.

The founders sold Ellio's to Purex Industries in 1971 and Betzios went on the create Betzios Pizza. When Purex's consumer division was acquired by Greyhound in 1985, Ellio's joined the company's Armour-Dial subsidiary.

In 1988, Canadian frozen food company McCain Foods acquired the Ellio's brand from the Dial Corporation, as it was then named, and continued pizza production in Lodi, NJ. At the time, the frozen pizza brand had $30 million in annual sales and was outselling all competitors in the New York City, Boston, and Philadelphia markets.

In 2006, Ellio's added a microwaveable pizza to its product line, adopting the more common round pizza form. In 2007, despite a distribution limited to the Northeastern U.S., Ellio's was the 9th best selling brand in the country, with sales totaling $34,880,060. In 2009, the product line expanded further, with the introduction of italian sausage and "Pepperoni Supreme" pizza.

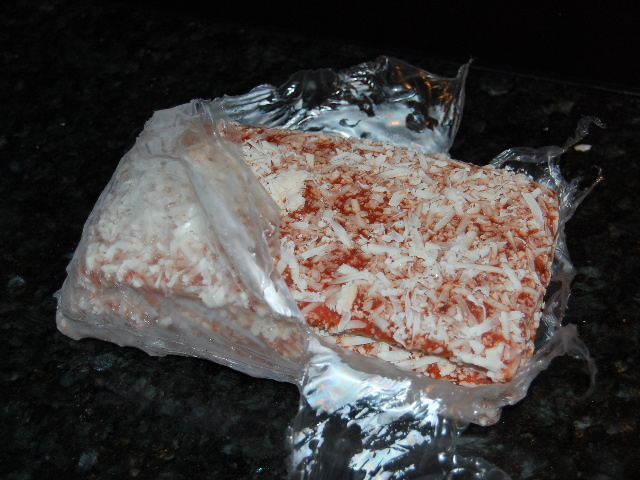
Prior to cooking

In 2014, McCain Foods announced the sale of its North American pizza business, including the Ellio's brand and production facilities, to German food manufacturer Dr. Oetker. The brand has continued to expand its variety. As of 2015, Ellio's is available in 8 different crust and topping configurations. In 2018, it also introduced breadsticks.

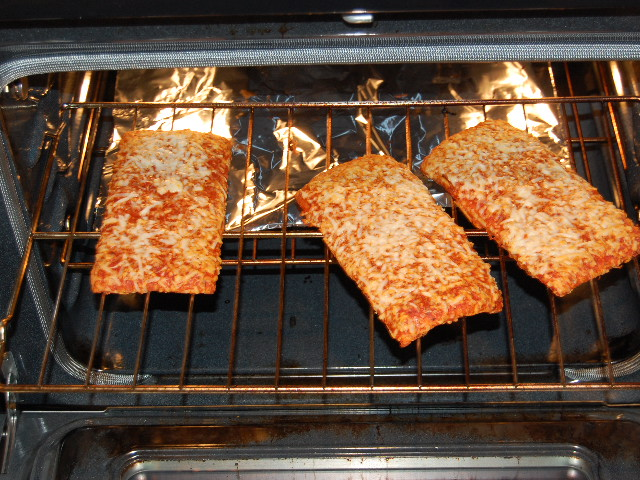
Baking

== See also ==
- List of frozen food brands
