= Rancho Feeding Corporation =

Defunct Californian slaughterhouse

Rancho Feeding Corporation was a slaughterhouse in Petaluma, California. The facility halted operations in February 2014, after several recalls of beef, including one amounting to 8.7 million pounds. The recalled beef had been processed between January 2013 and January 2014, and may have reached up to 35 states. The United States Department of Agriculture had alleged that Rancho processed diseased animals and circumvented federal inspection rules. The facility was then sold to new owners, who, after overhauling the slaughterhouse, began processing cattle and hogs in April 2014. On August 18, 2014, a federal grand jury indicted two former owners and two employees of the facility on felony charges, including slaughtering cows with "cancer eye" when inspectors were temporarily not present. The 1906 Federal Meat Inspection Act requires USDA inspectors to be present during all stages of slaughterhouse operations.
