= Steak-umm =

American brand of frozen meat products

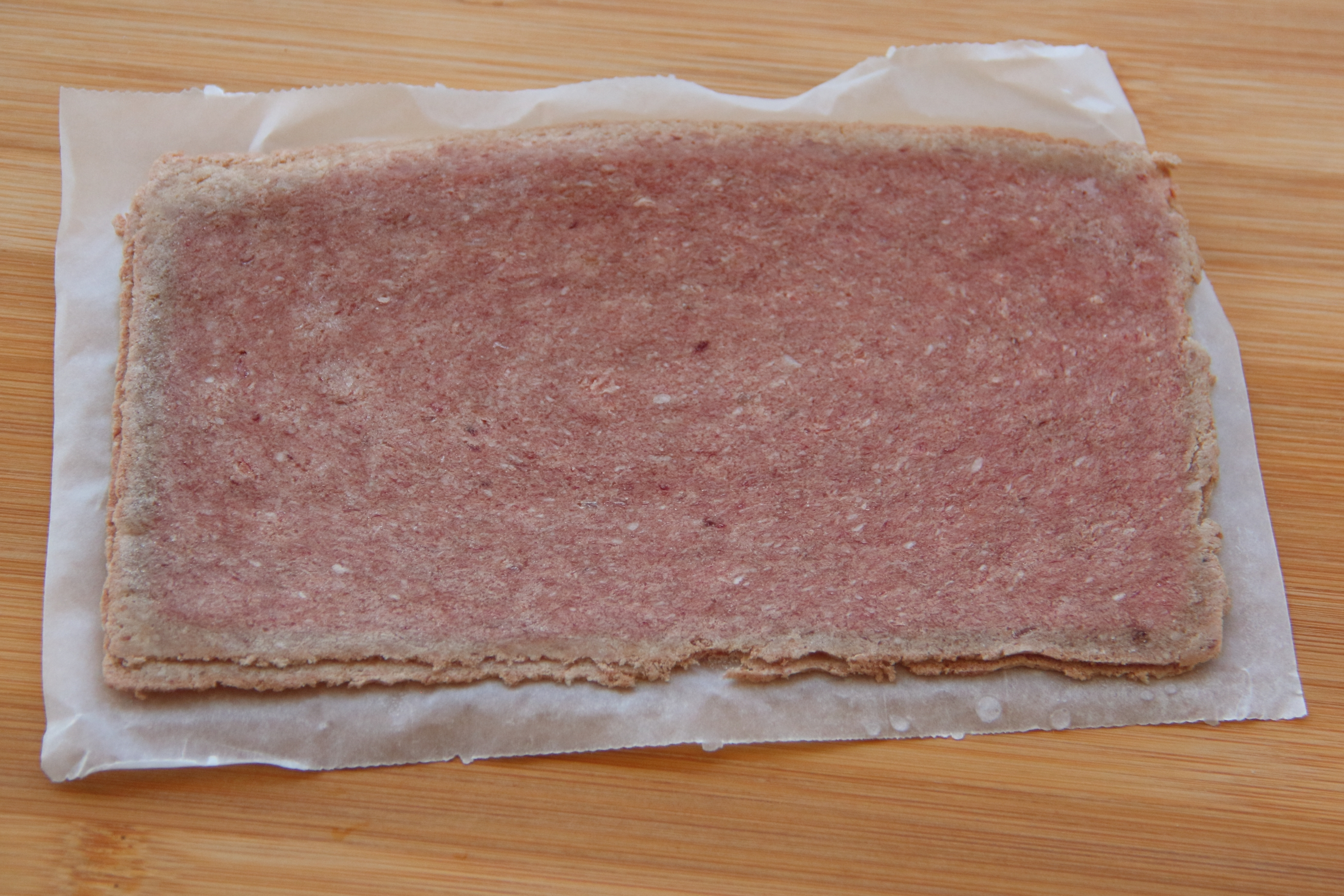
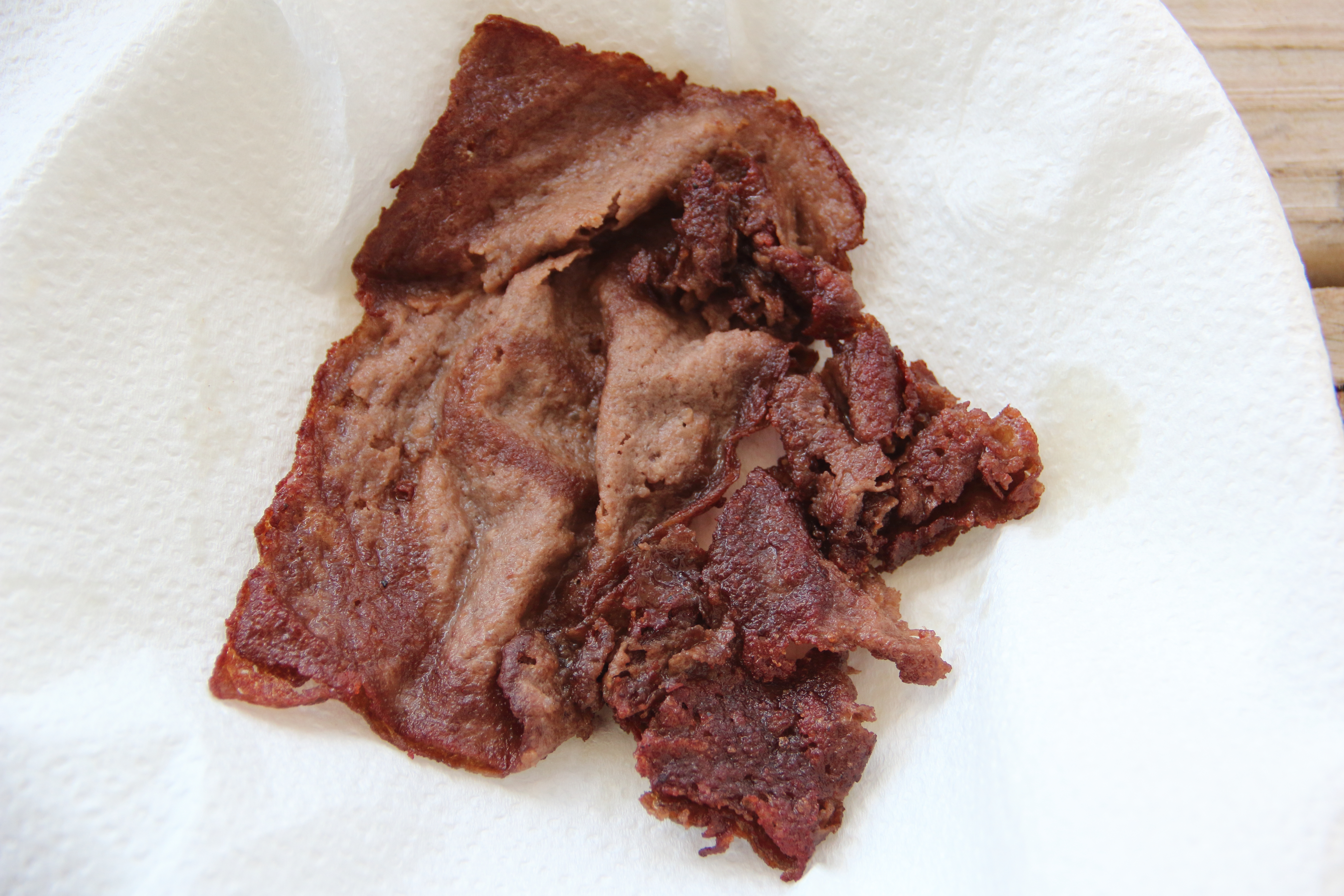
A frozen piece of Steak-umm (top) and cooked pieces of Steak-umm (bottom)

Steak-umm is a brand of thin-sliced frozen meat manufactured by The Steak-Umm Company, LLC. Steak-umms are sold in supermarkets throughout the United States and are used for making homemade Philadelphia-style cheesesteaks. The company claims to be "the best-known sandwich steak brand in America" and to have "helped turn the regional 'Philly Cheese Steak' Sandwich into standard fare on America's dinner tables over four decades ago". The company also produces ready-to-cook hamburger patties that are available in "Original" and "Sweet Onion" varieties.

Steak-Umm was previously owned by Gagliardi Bros., H.J. Heinz, and Pomfret, Connecticut-based TriFoods International. In 2006, Reading-based Quaker Maid Meats acquired the rights to the Steak-Umm brand name and associated intellectual property. The purchase of the Steak-Umm brand by TriFoods is cited in a formative business judgment rule judgement of a Delaware Chancery Court.

== History ==
The product was invented in 1968 by food technologist Eugene Gagliardi, who is also credited with inventing popcorn chicken. Gagliardi, who at the time worked at his family's meat-distributing company, Gagliardi Brothers, in West Philadelphia, created the meat as a softer alternative to steak sandwiches of the time. In 1975, the Steak-umm company was started, operating out of a meat-processing plant in West Chester, Pennsylvania, with the name coined by a friend of Gagliardi. The company was sold to H.J. Heinz in 1980 for $20 million, and marketed under its Ore-Ida frozen foods brand.

In April 1994, the Steak-umm brand was acquired by TriFoods International, Inc., a company which Gagliardi founded as Designer Foods, Inc. and held a minority share in. The company was moved from Pennsylvania to Pomfret, Connecticut. In 1996, Gagliardi sued TriFoods in Delaware Chancery Court, after his employment with the company was terminated and he was removed from his Chairman of the Board position. On May 22, 2006, Quaker Maid Meats purchased the rights to the Steak-umm brand, manufacturing the product in Reading, Pennsylvania.

In July 2009, Steak-umm brought suit against a Philadelphia grocery store and sandwich shop called "Steak'em Up" claiming trademark infringement. In 2012, federal District Judge Lawrence F. Stengel ruled in favor of the owners of Steak'em Up, ruling that the two establishments were not direct competitors and there was no significant evidence that consumers were confused by the names.

== Product description ==
According to inventor Gene Gagliardi, Steak-umm was created after putting beef through a grinder multiple times, mixing and molding it, freezing it, softening it, then ultimately slicing it.

In the 2012 lawsuit, Judge Lawrence Stengel described the product as "chopped and formed meat product that is comprised of beef trimmings left over after an animal is slaughtered and all of the primary cuts, such as tenderloin, filet, and rib eye, are removed. [...] the chopped and formed meat is pressed into a loaf and sliced, frozen and packaged."

It is sometimes used as a substitute for chipped beef.

== Twitter account ==
In 2017, Steak-umm started a campaign to have its Twitter account, @steak_umm, verified with a blue check with the hashtag #VerifySteakUmm. They acquired verified account status on January 15, 2018.

The Twitter account gained even more notoriety during the COVID-19 pandemic, due to the growing popularity of brands assuming casual, self-aware Twitter personas. The Steak-Umm account started posting inspirational tweets, jokes, and even getting into some controversy with Neil DeGrasse Tyson. The exact reasons for the account's growth in popularity have been the subject of an academic study and dialogue between researchers.

== See also ==
- Frozen food
- Steak sandwich
- Submarine sandwich
