= Popcorn chicken =

Chicken dish originated from Kentucky Fried Chicken

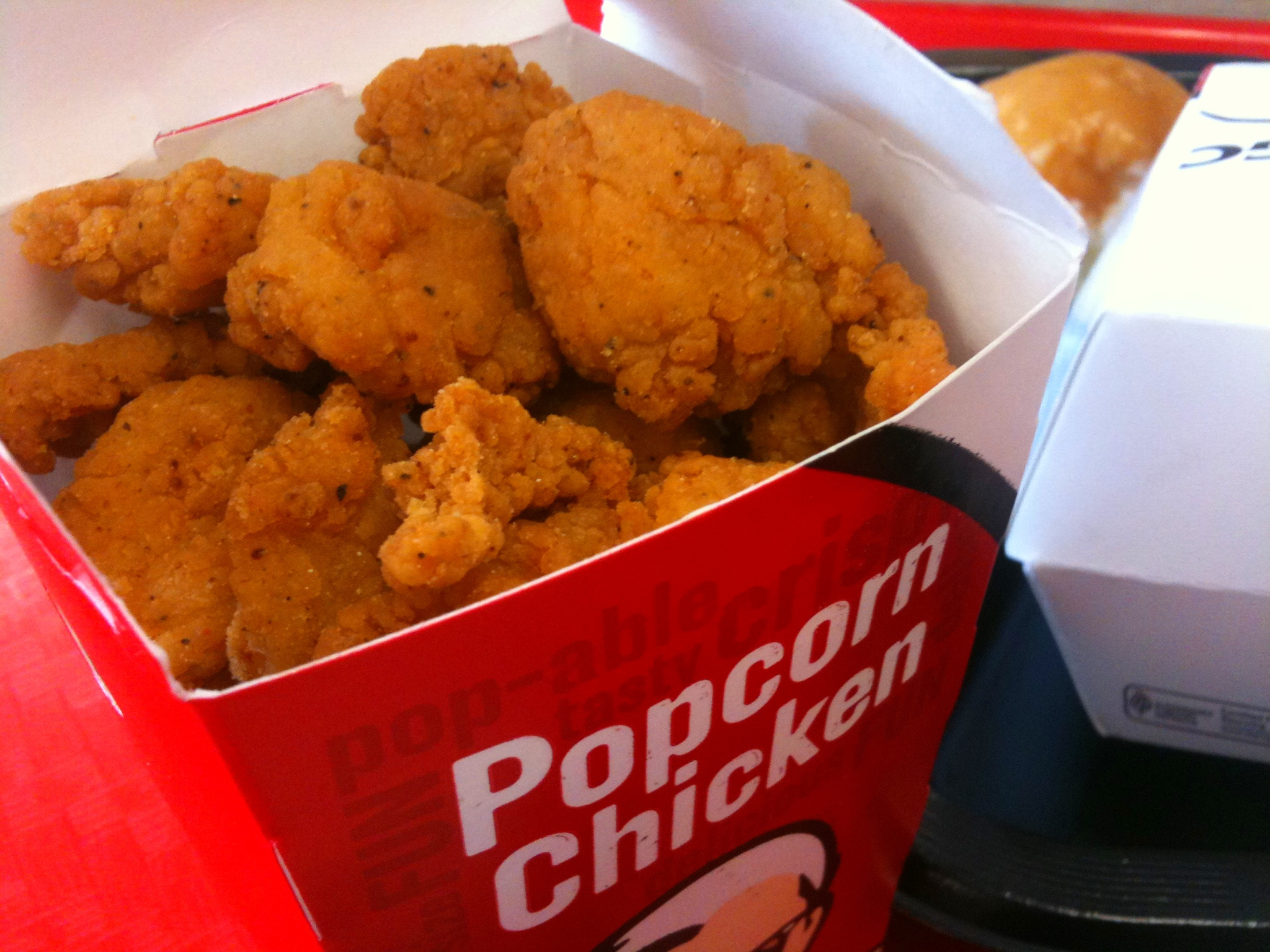
KFC popcorn chicken.

Popcorn chicken is a dish consisting of small, bite-sized pieces of chicken (about the size of popcorn) that have been breaded and fried. The idea was originally developed by KFC in 1991, but heavily inspired by fried chicken street food in Taiwan. The dish has since been adopted by many restaurants with fried chicken items.

== KFC ==
Popcorn chicken was invented by food technologist Gene Gagliardi, who also invented Steak-umm. It was test-marketed in the United States from March 1992, and was launched nationwide by September of that year. It has been periodically available in KFC outlets. It was re-introduced in the US in 1998, and again in 2001. It was re-introduced once again in 2015, under the name "KFC Popcorn Nuggets". In 2026, KFC re-introduced it, rebranded once again to popcorn chicken.

It is also available in the UK, Ireland, Canada, Australia, Malaysia, Singapore, New Zealand and Greece. As of 2018, it is also available in the Netherlands and Belgium; it has been available in Italy since 2019. It is also available in India, where it is marketed as "Chicken Popcorn".

== See also ==
- List of deep-fried foods
- Popcorn shrimp
- Taiwanese fried chicken
