= King of Pops =

American popsicle company

King of Pops is an Atlanta-based popsicle company. It was established by brothers Steven and Nick Carse, and is currently based out of the Atlanta neighborhood of Inman Park. The business operates 95 pushcarts and two customized ice cream trucks, and has retail branches in Athens, Georgia, Charleston, South Carolina, Greenville, South Carolina, Richmond, Virginia, Nashville, Tennessee, and Charlotte, North Carolina, among other places. King of Pops also operates three walk up bars in Atlanta that serve up pop-tails and slushies. Over the years King of Pops has made almost 500 flavors, most of which are between three and five ingredients.

== History ==
The company was established in 2010 by Steven and Nick Carse. Steven Carse decided to start the business when he was laid off from his job as an analyst at AIG in 2009. Nick has said that when his brother got laid off "it was the final impetus" to start King of Pops. In April 2010, Carse began his business by selling frozen treats with a pushcart at a gas station located in Poncey-Highland.

King of Pops business consists of carts, catering and wholesale. Product can be found in many high-end delis, urban markets and Whole Foods Market. They also have a window shop in their headquarters in Inman Park, Atlanta. In 2015, they started selling their pops at Turner Field during the Atlanta Braves home games. In addition, the company began selling their pops at First Tennessee Park during the Nashville Sounds home games in 2018.

Amongst their most popular pop flavors are Chocolate Sea Salt, Raspberry Lime, Cookies n' Cream, Banana Puddin', Orange Basil and Strawberry Lemonade.

In 2012, the company launched "Tree Elves", a business in which they and their employees delivered potted Christmas trees to customers dressed as elves, and then after the holidays they pick them up and take it to their Farm King of Crops for compost. In 2014, the company purchased a 68-acre farm in Douglasville, Georgia, where they intend to grow ingredients needed for their pops such as, according to Creative Loafing, "mint, basil, lemongrass, ginger, berries and melons".

In 2015, Dad's Garage Theatre Company produced King of Pops: The Post Apocalyptic Musical, a fictionalized version of Steven Carse's story featuring battles between rival food trucks. The show was written by Mike Schatz and directed by Tom Rittenhouse.

In 2020, in the height of COVID, King of Pops was impacted when corporate events, sporting events, and spring events were cancelled. As a result they had to lay off 50% of its workforce. At the same time, they launched a fund raising campaign to gift 10,000 pops to hospital and urgent care workers.

in 2022, King of Pops began franchising their popsicle carts in a program called Cartrepreneurs As of June 2024, the King of Pops has 38 franchises across 6 states

In 2023, King of Pops began operating carts in Decatur as part of a mobile food vendor program created by the city in partnership with the Decatur Downtown Development Authority (DDA). This comes after a 2019 investigation, which involved more than 400 public records, and that revealed that the city of Decatur was actively promoting a since closed local Decatur business – Steel City Pops – over its Atlanta-based rival, King of Pops.

== Flavors ==
Year Round Flavors:

- Raspberry Lime
- Strawberry Lemonade
- Blackberry Ginger Lemonade
- Blueberry Lemonade
- Chocolate Sea Salt
- Cookies n' Cream
- Orange Cream
- Thai Iced Tea
- Banana Puddin'
- Strawberries n' Cream

Spring Season:

- Fresh Peach
- Blood Orange
- Sweet Tea n' Lemonade
- Mexican Chocolate

Summer Season:

- Pineapple Habanero
- Peaches n' Cream
- Banana Caramel

Autumn Season:

- Pear Vanilla
- Orange Basil
- Blueberry Cobbler

Winter Season:

- Apple Cider
- Salted Caramel
- White Chocolate Peppermint
- Chocolate Orange
- Maple Brown Sugar
