= Kidfresh =

Brand of meals for children

Kidfresh packaging and logo

Kidfresh is a brand that offers processed food specifically designed for children. It is available at various retailers, including Whole Foods, Kroger, Safeway, Target, and ShopRite.

== History ==
Kidfresh was founded in 2007 and initially introduced its concept through a Kidfresh store in New York City. The store offered food specifically targeted towards children, including meals prepared in their own kitchen, known as the "kidchen." The Kidfresh store gained media attention, appearing in news segments by ABC News, CBS News, NBC News, and France2. In 2009, Kidfresh began selling their prepared meals in retail stores.

== Products ==
Kidfresh meals are promoted as being made with natural ingredients and are free from artificial colors, flavors, and preservatives. They claim to include a serving of vegetables and offer a rich nutrient content. The company also asserts that their products are low in sodium, fat, and saturated fats, have 0 grams of trans fat, and contain fewer than 400 calories.

Some Kidfresh frozen meals are: Totally Twisted Pasta + Meatballs, Rainbow Rice + Chicken, Easy Cheesy Ravioli, Spaghetti Loops Bolognese, Muy Cheesy Quesadillas, and Wagon Wheels Mac + Cheese.
