= Merage family =

Iranian Jewish family in California

The Merage Family خانوادهٔ معراج
- Current region: United States
- Origin: Iran (Persia)
- Estates: Orange County, California

The Merage family (Persian: خانوادهٔ معراج, /məˈrɑːdʒ/) is a wealthy Iranian Jewish family residing in Orange County, California. In 2004 the Merage Jewish Community Center opened in Irvine, California; the center was named after the Merage Family and serves the needs of Orange County.

David and Paul Merage co-founded Chef America Inc. where they created the popular microwavable snack Hot Pockets in the early 1980s. The brothers later sold the Chef America Inc. company to Nestlé for $2.6 billion. Hot Pockets were manufactured in Englewood, Colorado, Chef America's former headquarters, until moving its business to the rest of Nestlé's frozen business in Solon, Ohio.

Paul Merage's daughter Michelle Janavs, a food executive who was at one point regarded as the Hot Pockets "heiress," was later implicated in the notorious Operation Varsity Blues college admissions scandal. She was later sentenced in February 2020 to five months in prison after pleading guilty to paying Rick Singer $400,000 to have her son admitted to Georgetown as an unequipped tennis player and $100,000 to fix ACT scores for her two daughters so they could be admitted into the University of Southern California.
