= Tyson Looney Tunes Meals =

Frozen dinner line

Looney Tunes Meals were a line of frozen dinners introduced by Tyson Foods in 1990. They were based on the characters from the eponymous Warner Bros. cartoon franchise and targeted at children. The meals were discontinued in late 1993 because of declining sales.

== History ==
Released to coincide with Bugs Bunny's 50th birthday, the meals came packaged in blue boxes that featured a Looney Tunes character on the front, and were often marketed as coming with small prizes, including comic books, trading cards, and stickers. They came in a tray divided into three sections: a main course, a side dish, and a dessert (in some cases, there would instead be two side dishes included in place of the dessert). Instructions for the dinners stated they were to be heated in the microwave for 2 minutes, rotated, heated for another 1–2 minutes, then given an additional 2–3 minutes to cool off before serving, making for 5–7 minutes of preparation. These meals were similar to Kid's Kitchen and Kid Cuisine, other popular frozen dinner brands aimed at children from the time.

The meals were launched with a $15 million advertising campaign. The meals received generally mixed reception from children, and there were concerns from parents regarding the nutritional value of the meals. They received criticism for using excessive fat and salt, going against their claims of providing a healthy meal. Likely as a result of this and the 1990s economic recession, sales began to decline, and production on the meals ceased in 1993.

== Varieties ==
The meals were originally released with eight variations, with several other entries being introduced in later years. There would also be a pasta sub-variety in the line, introduced around 1992.

- Bugs Bunny Chicken Chunks – chicken nuggets, macaroni and cheese, and carrots
- Bugs Bunny and Tasmanian Devil Pasta – beef ravioli in tomato sauce
- Daffy Duck Spaghetti and Meatballs – spaghetti and meatballs in tomato sauce, corn, and oatmeal cookies
- Daffy Duck and Elmer Fudd Pasta – pasta in pizza sauce with pepperoni
- Elmer Fudd Turkey and Dressing – turkey breast with dressing and gravy, green beans, and fudge cookies
- Foghorn Leghorn Pepperoni Pizza – pepperoni pizza, corn, and fudge brownie
- Foghorn Leghorn and Henery Hawk Pasta – pasta in spaghetti sauce with meat
- Henery Hawk Hot Dog – hot dog, tater tots, and corn
- Porky Pig Patty Deluxe – sausage patty on a bun with cheese, tater tots, and cherry cobbler
- Road Runner Chicken Sandwich – chicken sandwich, potato wedges, and applesauce
- Road Runner and Wile E. Coyote Pasta – pasta in pizza sauce with Italian sausage
- Speedy Gonzales Beef Enchiladas – beef enchiladas in salsa, Spanish rice, and corn
- Sylvester Fish Sticks – fish sticks, tater tots, and green beans
- Sylvester and Tweety Pasta – pasta in cheesy pizza sauce
- Tasmanian Devil Chicken Drumsticks - chicken drumsticks, mashed potatoes, and corn
- Tweety Macaroni and Cheese – macaroni and cheese, green beans, and applesauce
- Wile E. Coyote Hamburger Pizza – hamburger pizza, green beans, and oatmeal cookies
- Yosemite Sam BBQ Glazed Chicken – chicken wings in barbecue sauce, mashed potatoes, and corn nuggets

In later releases for some of these meals, the side dishes would be changed or altered.
