= Oetker family =

German entrepreneurial dynasty

- Business family
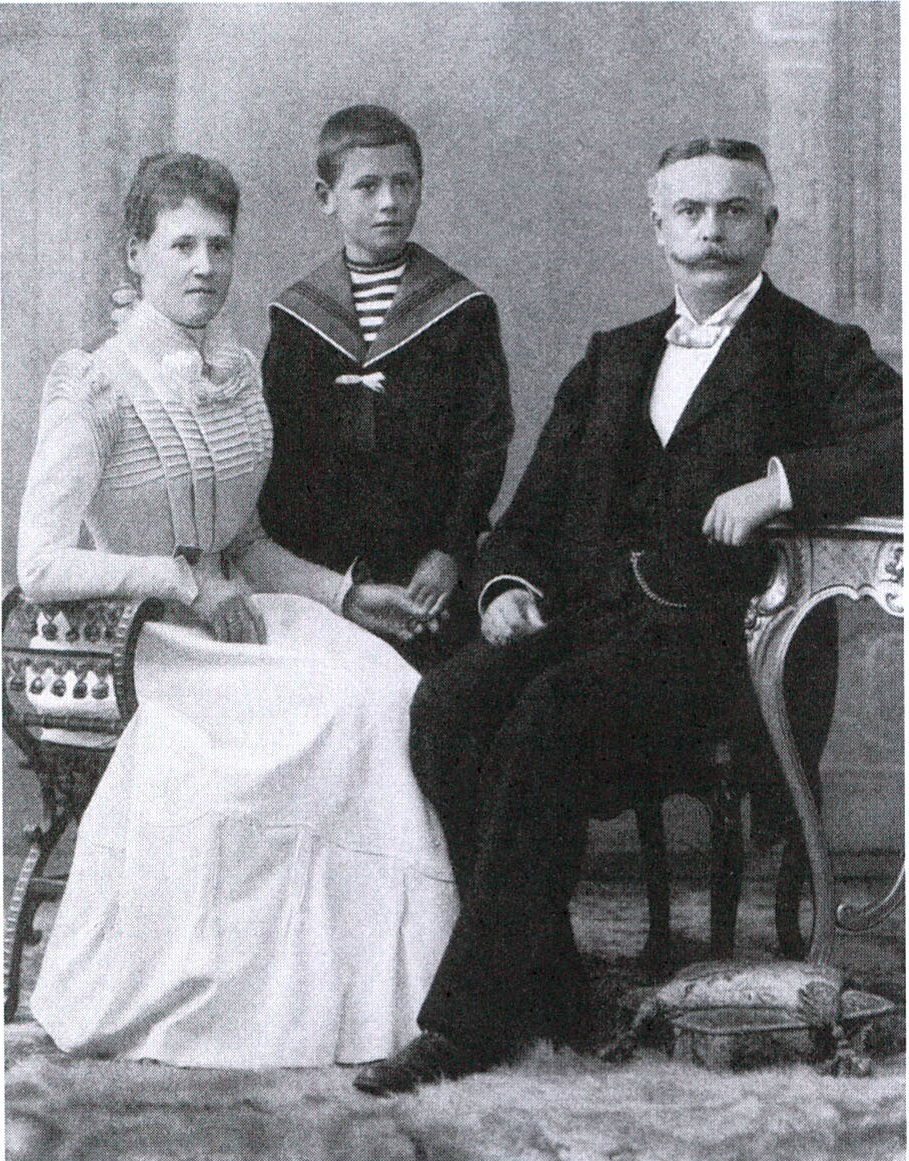
- August Oetker and family in 1895
- Place of origin: Obernkirchen, Electorate of Hesse
- Founded: Business activities started 1891, Bielefeld; 134 years ago
- Founder: August Oetker

The Oetker family is a German entrepreneurial dynasty from Bielefeld, Germany, who made their fortune in baking powder. The Oetker family was established by patriarch August Oetker who was the founder of Dr. Oetker, a leading German food manufacturing concern, which employed 29,000+ employees worldwide (2023).

== Businesses ==
In July 2021, the shareholders of Dr. August Oetker KG announced the division of the companies of the former Oetker Group into two independently operating corporate groups (Dr. August Oetker KG and Geschwister Oetker Beteiligungen KG). The division became effective November 1, 2021.

=== Oetker-Gruppe ===
Oetker-Gruppe is the primary holding. It remains owned by the family branches of Richard Oetker, Philip Oetker, Rudolf Louis Schweizer (a son of Rosely Schweizer), Markus von Luttitz and Ludwig Graf Douglas.

=== Geschwister Oetker Beteiligungs KG ===
Geschwister Oetker Beteiligungs KG is the primary holding owned by the youngest children of Rudolf August Oetker. The controlling shareholders are Alfred Oetker, Carl Ferdinand Oetker and Julia Johanna Oetker.

=== Dr. Arend Oetker Holding GmbH & Co KG ===
The third, independent, concern, Dr. Arend Oetker Holding GmbH & Co KG, which is owned by Arend Oetker, a nephew of Rudolf August Oetker. His holdings were inherited by his mother Ursula Oetker, and were largely expanded by him. Most notably this included Schwartauer Werke (jam manufacturing), Hero Group, KWS Saat and a shipping company.

=== Geschwister Oetker Beteiligungen KG / Dr. August Oetker KG ===
==== Food ====
- Dr. Oetker
- Coppenrath & Wiese

==== Beer and Non-alcoholic beverages ====
- Radeberger Group
- Getränke Hoffmann
- DrinkPort

Other

- Flaschenpost
- Oetker Digital
- OEDIV
- Handelsgesellschaft Sparrenberg mbH
- Roland Transport
- Brenners Park-Hotel & Spa
- Hotel du Cap-Eden Roc

Geschwister Oetker Beteiligungen KG

- Henkell Freixenet (sparkling wine producer)
- Martin Braun Gruppe (bakery supply company)
- Budenheim (chemicals company)
- Oetker Collection (hotel operator company)
- Columbus Properties Inc. (US real estate)
- Atlantic Forfaitierungs AG (global trade finance service provider)
- Kunstsammlung Rudolf-August Oetker GmbH (Rudolf-August Oetker art collection)
