= Ursula Oetker =

Ursula Oetker (née Oetker; 26 May 1915 – 23 December 2005) was a German businesswoman and heiress of the Oetker family. She was a member of the Nazi Party since 1940.

== Life ==
Oetker was born 26 May 1915 in Bielefeld, German Empire, the older of two children, to Rudolf Oetker (1889–1916) and Ida (née Meyer). Her father died during World War I in Verdun, shortly before her younger brother Rudolf August Oetker was born. From her father, she received a relatively meager inheritance in comparison to her brother. Most notably she inherited the Schwartauer Werke (jam manufacturing) which was financially destitute. Her son, Arend Oetker, ultimately saved Schwartauer Werke from bankruptcy and developed it to market leader in Germany in the 1960s.

== Personal life ==
Oetker married Heinrich Oetker, a farmer, originally from Wiedensahl, Lower Saxony, who was very distantly related to her. They were 8th cousins, hence her married name remained Oetker. They had five children:

- Arend Heinrich Rudolf Oetker, colloquially Arend Oetker (born 1939), who became an industrialist himself and took-over his mothers holdings (most notably Schwartauer Werke, TT-Line and later Hero Group) and served as president of the Federation of German Industries and the German Council on Foreign Relations. He was married two times and has five children.
- Renate Oetker, married Rânebach (born 1940), an artist.
- Ernst-August Oetker (1941–2016), who was mentally disabled.
- Regine Oetker (1944–2022), never married and without issue.
- Roland Karl Theodor Oetker (born 1949), a businessman, industrialist and former banking executive as well as controlling shareholder of R.O.I. Verwaltungsgesellschaft mbH (which primarily holds participations in companies such as Falke Bank and Klöckner & Co). He is married to Suzanne von Franquet; two children.

Oetker died in 2005 aged 90 in Lübeck. She was buried in Detmold.
