= Alfred Oetker =

German businessman and executive (born 1967)

- Born: Alfred Heinrich Christoph Rudolf Oetker; 13 July 1967 (age 59); Toronto, Ontario, Canada
- Citizenship: Germany; Canada
- Occupations: Businessman, executive
- Spouse: Elvira Grimaldi di Nixima (m. 2001)
- Family: Oetker family

Alfred Heinrich Christoph Rudolf Oetker colloquially Alfred Oetker (born 13 July 1967) is a Canadian-born German businessman and executive and member of the Oetker family. He is the third youngest son of Rudolf August Oetker and Maja Oetker. His net worth is estimated at $2.2 billion by Forbes magazine.

== Early life ==
Oetker was born 13 July 1967 in Toronto, Canada, the third youngest son of Rudolf August Oetker, controlling shareholder of Dr. Oetker, and his third wife Maja Oetker (née von Malaisé; born 1934), who hailed from nobility. He was raised in Bielefeld among his two younger siblings; Ferdinand (born 1972) and Julia (born 1979). He had five half-siblings, including Richard Oetker and Rosely Schweizer, from his fathers previous two marriages.

As one of the great-grandchildren of August Oetker, he was among the eight family delegates of multinational food company Dr. Oetker.

== Career ==
Following the split of several business units, effective 1 November 2021, Oetker became a managing partner in Geschwister Oetker Beteiligungen KG among his two younger siblings.

== Personal life ==
Since 2001, Oetker is married to the Italian Donna Elvira Grimaldi di Nixima, of the Genovese Grimaldi di Nixima family, that has been settled on Sicily since the 14th century.
