= Vanessa Beecroft =

Italian-born American performance artist (born 1969)

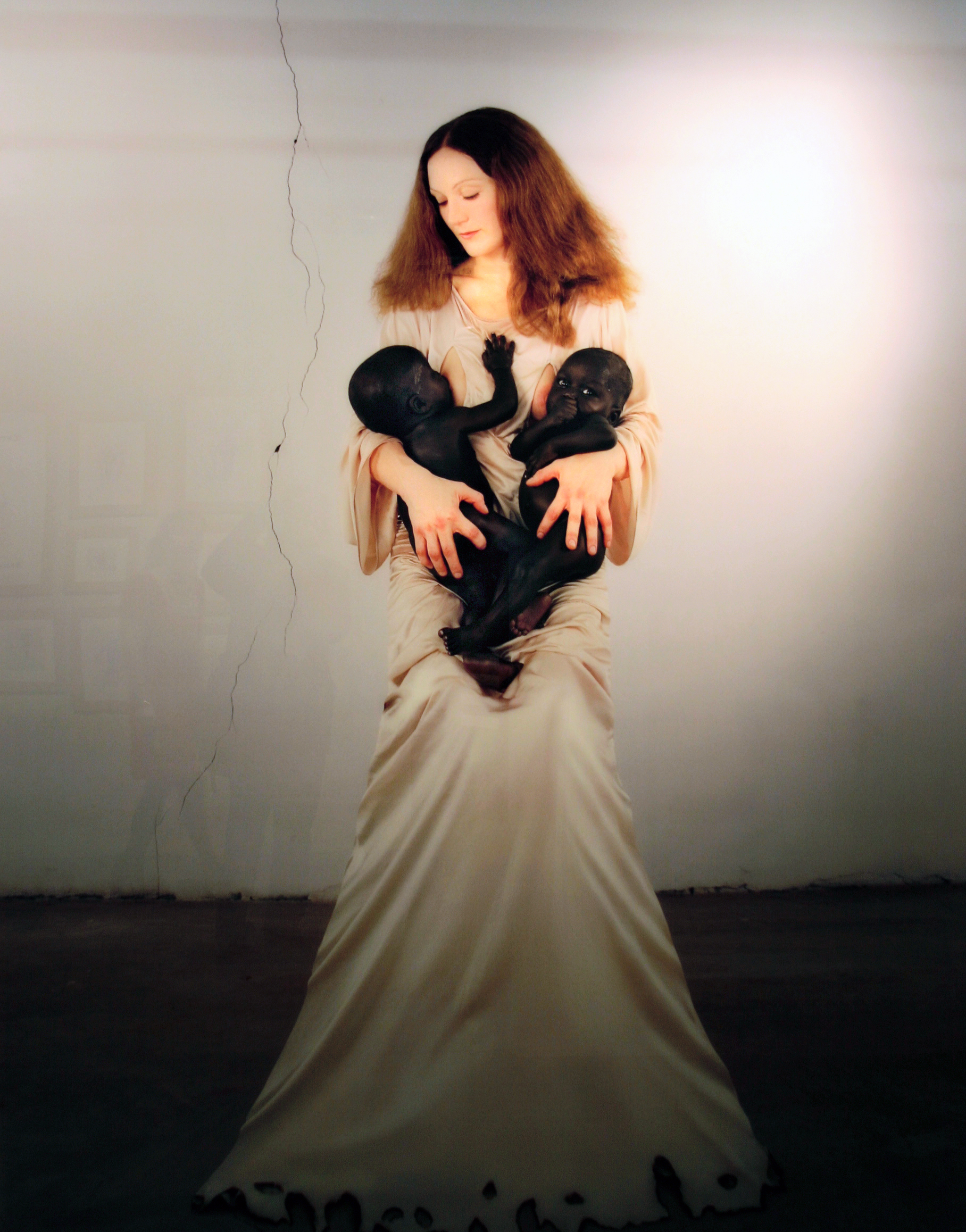
- Beecroft in White Madonna with Twins (2006)
- Born: April 25, 1969 (age 57); Genoa, Italy
- Education: Brera Academy (Milan, Italy)
- Occupation: Artist
- Known for: Performance, photography, drawing, painting, sculpture
- Works: VB performances
- Movement: Relational art
- Spouses: Greg Durkin; Federico Spadoni
- Children: 4
- Website: vanessabeecroft.com

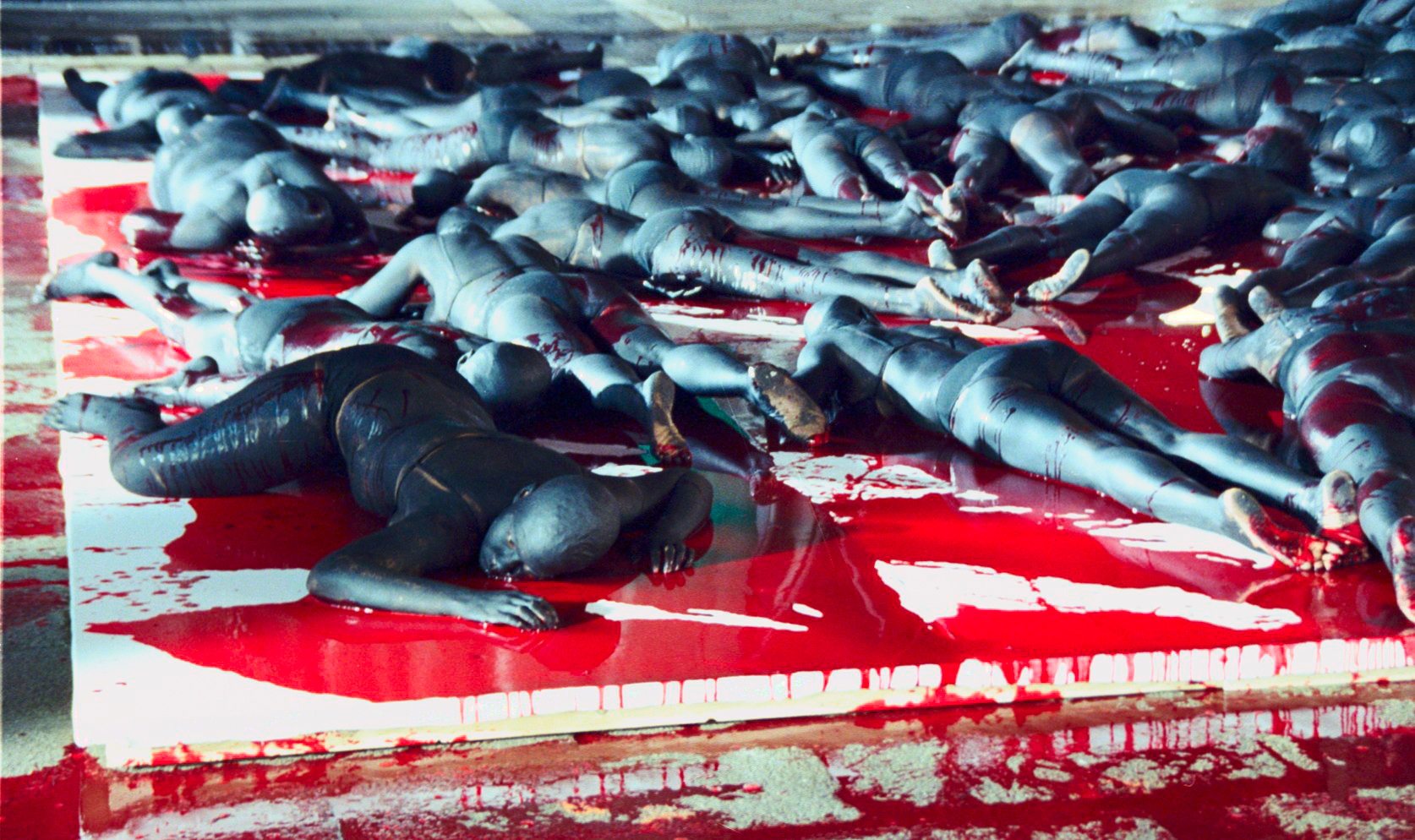
VB61, Still Death! Darfur Still Deaf? (2007) at the 52nd Venice Biennale

Vanessa Beecroft (born April 25, 1969) is an Italian-born American contemporary performance artist; she also works with photography, video art, sculpture, and painting. Many of her works have made use of professional models, sometimes in large numbers and sometimes naked or nearly so, to stage tableaux vivants. She works in the United States, and is based in Los Angeles as of 2009. Her early work was focused on gender and appeared to be autobiographical; her later work is focused on race. Starting in 2008 she began working with Kanye West on collaborations and commercial projects.

== Early life and education ==
Vanessa Beecroft was born April 25, 1969, in Genoa, Italy and raised in Santa Margherita Ligure and Malcesine near Lake Garda. Both of her parents were teachers; she was born to an Italian mother, Maria Luisa and a British father, Andrew Beecroft. After she was born, her family briefly moved to Holland Park, west London.

Her parents divorced when she was three years old and she did not see her father or her younger brother again until she was 15 years old. Her mother raised Beecroft alone in a village in Italy in a strict vegan household with no cars, no television, and no phone. In childhood, she was hospitalized for overeating specific foods she thought would cleanse her system, and she struggled with an eating disorder.

From 1988 to 1993 she attended Brera Academy in Milan, Italy. Her first art exhibition VB01 (1993) was in a gallery in Milan and featured a performance with other female students from Brera Academy wearing Beecroft's clothing, and sharing Beecroft's "Book of Food", a diary documenting her food consumption from 1985 and 1993. The "Book of Food" documented Beecroft's bulimic eating habits and was referenced again in her later work, but it was separate from the performances.

She moved to the United States in 1996, at the invitation of art dealer Jeffrey Deitch, settling in New York City.

== Art ==
Some common themes in the work include self discipline (of the models), voyeurism, and power relationships. Beecroft's artwork is often performance or installation-based with live human figures, but she also documents the performances with photography and video; this work is in many public museum and art collections including the Art Institute of Chicago, Museum of Modern Art (MoMA), Museo Nacional Centro de Arte Reina Sofía, Österreichische Galerie Belvedere, Van Abbemuseum, amongst others.

=== VB performances (1993–present) ===
The Book of Food was titled VB01; from that moment on, all her performances bore her initials "VB" in the title, followed by a sequential number corresponding to the performance. Strict rules were imposed on the models' behavior during the performances and they were instructed not to engage with the audience. Models were uniformed, nude, or barely clothed and were required to stand for hours, often in tall high heels without movement or eye contact. Beecroft always used tall, thin, young models, whom she referred to as "girls" regardless of their age. In later work, Beecroft would use designer accessories or shoes as props for the models.

- VB02, VB03, VB04, and VB08 took place in 1994 and featured live girl models all dressed in bright red wigs (an exaggerated representation of Beecroft's own hair color) and white underwear. VB08 (1994) performance took place at MoMA PS1 in Long Island City, New York, using live female models, pantyhose, and bright red wigs.
- VB25 (1996) performance took place at Van Abbemuseum in Eindhoven, Netherlands, with seven identical-looking young women wearing fake eyelashes and red nail polish, each dressed in a polo-neck pullover, white underwear, tights, and high heels.
- VB35: Show (1998) took place at the Guggenheim Museum in New York; twenty women stood in the museum for two hours in a circular arrangement in order to mirror the architecture. Fifteen of the women wore rhinestone-decorated bikinis designed by Tom Ford, and five of the women were nude. This was a larger event than some of her prior work and made international news. Casting was done by Jennifer Starr, and the production was done by Yvonne Force Villareal, and Doreen Remen.
- VB45 (2001) took place at the Kunsthalle Wien, Vienna, Austria, with 45 girls, naked except for black, thigh-high boots designed for the performance by Helmut Lang.
- VB51 (2002) was her first filmed performance; it took place in Schloss Vinsebeck, Stenheim, Germany. It featured older models in their 60s, including Beecroft's mother, mother-in-law, stepsister, and the actresses Irm Hermann and Hanna Schygulla (both actresses from films by Rainer Werner Fassbinder, Beecroft's favorite director).
- VB53 (2004) at the Tepidarium in Giardino dell’Orticultura, Florence, Italy, women were staged in a mound of dirt, as if they were plants.
- VB54 (2004) was to be performed at Terminal 5 of the John F. Kennedy Airport with 36 young women standing in formation in the sunken waiting area wearing only afro wigs, black body paint, and silver shackles on their ankles, however the installation was rejected by the airline sponsor.
- VB55 (2005) featured one hundred women standing still in Berlin's Neue Nationalgalerie for three hours, each woman oiled from the waist up and wearing nothing but a pair of pantyhose.
- VB61, Still Death! Darfur Still Deaf? (2007), one of Beecroft's most politically engaged performances, was presented the 52nd Venice Biennale. It involved "approximately 30 Sudanese women with their skin painted, lying face-down on a white canvas on the ground, simulating dead bodies piled on top of one another", representing the genocide in Darfur, Sudan.
- VB65 (March 2009) performance at Padiglione d'Arte Contemporanea (PAC) in Milan, Italy, featured a "Last Supper" of twenty African immigrant men, dressed formally in suits (some without shoes), drinking water, eating chicken and brown bread without cutlery.
- VB66 (2010) took place at Mercato Ittico di Napoli (the fish market), Naples, Italy with fifty living models, staged on a platform amongst a group of cast body sculptures and body parts, all painted black. It highlighted the relationships among body, sculpture, and an iconographical reference to the nearby ruins of Pompeii.
- VB67 (2010) performance took place at Studio Nicoli in Carrara, Italy, and again a similar reenactment in a year later, VB70: Marmi (2011) at Lia Rumma gallery in Milan. The models were staged near marble sculpture statues and the stone was in various states including polished, rough, and in blocks and slabs.

Many of the VB performances were documented in the Dave Hickey book VB 08-36: Vanessa Beecroft Performances (2000), and in Emily L. Newman's book Female Body Image in Contemporary Art: Dieting, Eating Disorders, Self-Harm, and Fatness (2018).

=== Other work ===
In October 2005, Beecroft staged a three-hour performance on the occasion of the opening of the Louis Vuitton store, "Espace Louis Vuitton" on the Champs-Élysées in Paris. For the same event, Beecroft placed models both black and white on the shelves next to Louis Vuitton bags in a "human alphabet". In 2007 the Louis Vuitton company apologized to Dutch graphic designer Anthon Beeke for mimicking his "Naked Ladies Alphabet" design without his consent.

In 2018, Beecroft and Kim Kardashian collaborated on a series of nude photos of Kardashian that were displayed on social media for the release of Kardashian's perfume, which had a "Kardashian body-shaped bottle".

In 2025, Beecroft directed the premiere of Ennio Morricone's only operatic work, Partenope, at the Teatro di San Carlo in Naples.

== Collaborations with Kanye West ==
Since 2008, Beecroft has been collaborating on work with artist Kanye West. They began working together with a listening party at Ace Gallery, Los Angeles for West's music albums 808s and Heartbreaks. In 2010, Beecroft was named creative lead for the Runaway music video. On the Kanye West music tour, the Yeezus Tour (October 2013 – September 2014), Beecroft designed the sets and choreography. Beecroft worked on West's Spike Jonze directed music video for the 2014 song “Only One”. In 2014, Beecroft assembled and built the wedding ceremony of Kim Kardashian and Kanye West . In September 2015 she directed Kanye's 808 and Heartbreak show at the Hollywood Bowl.

In February 2015, West embarked on a fashion design career with Yeezy Season 1, under the Adidas label and Beecroft directed the performance presentation. Beecroft went on to work on Yeezy Season 2 (September 2015), Yeezy Season 3 (February 2016), and Yeezy Season 4 (September 2016).

Beecroft alleged she was a full-time employee for West until 2016, when her role changed and she became a part-time contractor.

In 2019, she collaborated with West on two opera-based performances, Nebuchadnezzar and Mary.

== Controversies ==
Her performance work about gender was often critiqued for being a "post-feminist statement about fashion or pandering to a corrupted way of seeing". Photographer Collier Schorr noted, "Beecroft is interested in the aesthetics of how women look when they are looked at, and her body-conscious projects encourage alienation between model, artist, and audience." Beecroft's work with live female nude models in performances often uses a specific type of model, one with an Westernized "idealization" of the female body, all of the models appearing uniformly thin, tall, and young. These choices have been criticized as harmful, distorted, and conforming to gender stereotypes.

Beecroft has been quoted in an interview in 2016, “I have divided my personality. There is Vanessa Beecroft as a European white female, and then there is Vanessa Beecroft as Kanye, an African-American male.” Her later work deals with race, and she has made a series of racially insensitive remarks in interviews.

Beecroft's failed attempt to adopt Sudanese twins was the topic of the documentary The Art Star and the Sudanese Twins (2008) by Pietra Brettkelly, which was included in the Sundance Film Festival's World Cinema Documentary Competition. The film presents Beecroft as a "hypocritically self-aware, colossally colonial pomo narcissist" and chronicles her "damaging quotes and appalling behavior" as she attempts to adopt the orphans for use in an art exhibit.

== Personal life ==
Vanessa Beecroft was previously married to marketer Greg Durkin. They lived in Cold Spring Harbor, New York, together for many years. The marriage ended in divorce. Durkin and Beecroft had two sons together (born in 2001 and 2004). Later, she married photographer Federico Spadoni. Beecroft and Spadoni have one daughter and one son together (born 2009 and 2012).

== Bibliography ==
=== Biography ===
- Kampwerth, Karin; Thomas, Kellein; Beecroft, Vanessa (2004). Vanessa Beecroft. Kunsthalle Bielefeld. Berlin, Germany: Hatje Cantz Publishers. ISBN 9783775715072.

=== Exhibition catalogues ===
A select list of exhibition catalogues by Beecroft, listed in ascending order by publication year.

- Hickey, David; Beecroft, Vanessa (2000). VB 08-36: Vanessa Beecroft Performances. Ostfildern-Ruit, Germany: Hatje Cantz Publishers. ISBN 9783893229642.
- Beccaria, Marcella; Beecroft, Vanessa (2003). Vanessa Beecroft Performances 1993–2003 (art exhibition catalog from Castello di Rivoli Museo d'Arte Contemporanea (October 2003 – January 2004)). Milan, Italy: Skira. ISBN 88-8491-572-4. (English, French, Italian).
- Kellein, Thomas (2004). Vanessa Beecroft: Photographs, Films, Drawings (exhibition catalogue). Kunsthalle Bielefeld. Berlin, Germany: Hatje Cantz Publishers. ISBN 9783775715089.
- Cianchi, Lapo; Beecroft, Vanessa (2005). VB53: Vanessa Beecroft (exhibition catalogue). Fondazione Pitti Immagine Discovery (in Italy). Venice, Italy: Charta. ISBN 9788881584994.
- Polier, Alexandra; Deitch, Jeffrey; Lisi, Riccardo; Beecroft, Vanessa (2007). Vanessa Beecroft: VB LV. New York City, New York: Charta. ISBN 978-8881586158.
- Beecroft, Vanessa; Di Pietrantonio, Giacinto (2007). Vanessa Beecroft: Drawings and Paintings 1993–2007 (exhibition catalogue). Cataloghi di mostre. Galleria d'arte Moderna e Contemporanea (in Bergamo, Italy). Milan, Italy: Electa Mondadori. ISBN 9788837053574.
- Di Pietrantonio, Giacinto; Beecroft, Vanessa (2010). VB65 PAC Milano: Vanessa Beecroft. Milan, Italy: Mondadori Electa. ISBN 978-8837071059.

== See also ==
- Blackface in contemporary art
