= Richard Kaselowsky =

German entrepreneur, industrialist and member of the Nazi Party (1888-1944)

Richard Kaselowsky (14 August 1888 – 30 September 1944) was a German entrepreneur, industrialist, manager of Dr. Oetker, and member of the Nazi Party and Freundeskreis der Wirtschaft. He was the eldest son of the manufacturer Richard Kaselowsky, a deputy in the Prussian state parliament. He was the stepfather of Rudolf August Oetker.

== Early life ==
Kaselowsky was the eldest son of the entrepreneur Richard Kaselowsky (died 1921) and his wife Elise Pauline Kaselowsky née Delius. In 1907, he passed his Abitur in Bielefeld. He studied law at the University of Bonn, Humboldt University of Berlin and the University of Freiburg. In 1910, he completed a banking apprenticeship. In 1910, he volunteered for military service, however he was discharged due to an illness the following year. He then completed an apprenticeship at the Bethmann Bank, where he met chemist and entrepreneur Rudolf Oetker (1889–1916), the son of the pharmacist and entrepreneur August Oetker. From April 1913 he continued his training at a London bank.

== Business career ==
In 1914, Kaselowsky became a poultry farmer at Bad Nauheim. In 1916, both he and Rudolf Oetker were drafted into the Imperial German Army during World War I. Oetker was killed in action during the Battle of Verdun the same year. Kaselowsky survived the war. In 1919, he received his doctorate from the Goethe University Frankfurt. The same year, he married Rudolf Oetker's widow, Ida Oetker née Meyer. The couple had four children together: Ilse (1920 – 1944), Richard (1921 – 2002), Theodor (1922 – 1930), and Ingeborg (1927– 1944). Kaselowsky soon became a partner of the Dr. Oetker company. In 1920, Kaselowky effectively took over as the company's manager. By this time, Dr. Oetker had over 600 employees. The company continued to perform well under Kaselowsky. Kaselowsky also served as the chairman of the supervisory board of the Budenheim chemical factory in Mainz, Gundlach Holding in Bielefeld, a member of the supervisory board of Vogt & Wolf AG in Gütersloh, the Hamburg Süd, and deputy chairman of the supervisory board of the company now known as Dürkopp Adler. He also served with the Gebrüder Borchers and Deutsche Bank. In 1926, Kaselowky founded a stud farm for thoroughbred breeding.

== Nazi era ==
Kaselowsky joined the Nazi Party on the 1 May 1933, with his wife following in 1937. He later became an SS-Gruppenführer and a member of the Freundeskreis der Wirtschaft. Kaselowsky maintained close ties to the Nazi movement, and donated a total of 80,000 Reichsmarks to Heinrich Himmler, who used this money for various causes "outside the budget", such as funding the Ahnenerbe, which conducted Aryan historical and eugenicist research. Dr. Oetker became one of the first German businesses to be declared a "National Socialist model company". The company profited from the Aryanization of Jewish property. During World War II, Kaselowsky supported the war effort by providing pudding mixes and munitions to German troops. The business also used slave labour in some of its facilities.

On 30 September 1944, during an American air raid on Bielefeld, Kaselowsky and his family took shelter in a bunker which had been built in the basement of his villa. However, the bunker failed to protect them after the house was hit by a bomb. Kaselowsky, his wife, and their daughters, Ilse and Ingeborg, were all killed. The sole survivor was Richard Kaselowsky Junior. After the bombing raid, Kaselowsky's stepson, Rudolf August Oetker, who was serving in the Waffen-SS on the Eastern Front, was allowed to return home and take over the company. After the war, Oetker was interned in the Staumühle internment camp near Paderborn. When his SS blood group tattoo was discovered under his left armpit, which identified him as a member of the SS, he was brutally beaten by the guards. For years after the war, Oetker would need a cane to walk. He was released from custody in 1947. He would elevate the company to a household name in Germany today. Dr. Oetker became one of the symbols of the post-World War II recovery effort in the country. Oetker died in 2007.

In the post-war period, Kaselowsky was highly controversial in Bielefeld, especially regarding the naming of the Kunsthalle Bielefeld, co-financed by his stepson Rudolf August Oetker. While the Oetker family emphasized his role as a father and successful entrepreneur and described him as a victim of the war, others criticized his involvement in the regime, something which the company had ignored. Today, the Ida and Richard Kaselowsky Foundation, set up by the Oetker family, promotes social and charitable causes. In 1998, after long debates, a majority of the SPD and the Greens in the city council removed Kaselowsky's name from the name of the art gallery. The renaming of the street, on which Kaselowsky's villa stood, to Kaselowskystrasse, which took place on the occasion of Rudolf August Oetker's 85th birthday in 2001, led to protests. In 2016, the municipal committees decided to rename the street to Hochstraße, which was carried out on February 17, 2017.
