= Rosely Schweizer =

German businesswoman and politician

Member of the Landtag of Baden-Württemberg
- In office 1 January 1994 – 31 December 2001

Personal details
- Born: Roselie Oetker; 16 July 1940 (age 85) Hamburg, Nazi Germany (now Germany)
- Party: Christian Democratic Union
- Spouse: Folkart Schweizer (m. 1965)
- Relations: Oetker family
- Children: 3
- Parent(s): Rudolf August Oetker; Marlene Ahlmann Oetker
- Occupation: Businesswoman, politician

Rosely Schweizer (née Roselie Oetker; born 16 July 1940) is a German businesswoman, heiress and former politician who served on the Landtag of Baden-Württemberg for the Christian Democratic Union between 1994 and 2001. She owns a controlling stake of 12.5% in Dr. Oetker and has an estimated net worth of $2.8 billion.

== Early life and education ==
Schweizer was born Roselie Oetker on 16 July 1940 in Hamburg, Nazi Germany (presently Germany), the oldest and only child of Rudolf August Oetker and his first wife Marlene Oetker (née Ahlmann). Her mother hailed from an industrial family that owned Carlshütte, an iron foundry with at times employed over 3,000 employees.

Her parents were divorced in 1942. Through her fathers two additional marriages, she has a total of seven half-siblings; August (born 1944), Bergit (later Gräfin Douglas; born 1947), Christian (born 1948) and Richard (born 1951) and Alfred (born 1967), Ferdinand (born 1972) and Julia (born 1979). She completed her Abitur in Rendsburg and then studied economics at the University of Innsbruck in Austria obtaining a degree as Diplom-Volkswirt in 1964.

== Career ==
Schweizer was a partner and advisory board member of Henkell & Söhnlein and until 2010, she chaired the advisory board of Dr. Oetker.

== Politics ==
Initially, Schweizer served on the municipal council of Murrhardt. Between 1992 and 2001 she served as a member of the Landtag of Baden-Württemberg.

== Personal life ==
In 1965, she married Folkart Schweizer (born 1940), a businessman and later controlling owner of Louis Schweizer KG (a leather factory) as well as Schweizer + Weichand (later Schweizer Group) who also hailed from an industrial family. He was originally from Murrhardt, Schleswig-Holstein. They have three children;

- Rudolf Louis Schweizer (born 1967), a Stuttgart-based private investor
- Georg Folkart Werner Schweizer (born 1969), a principal of Louis Schweizer GmbH & Co KG in Murrhardt
- Carolina Schweizer (born 1972), married to a Mr. Hiebl, a photographer

Schweizer resides in Murrhardt in Baden-Württemberg.
