= Henry Jones (baker) =

- Born: c. 1812
- Died: 12 July 1891; Court House, Caldicot, Monmouthshire, Wales
- Occupation: Baker
- Known for: Inventing self-raising flour

Henry Jones (c. 1812 – 12 July 1891) was a baker in Bristol, England, who was responsible in 1845 for inventing self-raising flour. He established a family business called Henry Jones (Bristol) Ltd. His flour meant that hard tack could have been removed from sailors of the British Navy but the admiralty resisted for some years.

== Biography ==
Jones was born in about 1812, and established a bakery in Broadmead, Bristol. He was granted a patent for self-raising flour in 1845, and by the end of 1846 its runaway success led to him being appointed purveyor of patent flour and biscuits to Queen Victoria. He was granted a patent in the USA on 1 May 1849, and in 1852 the first gold medal for the new flour was issued to a Chicago firm using the Bristol formula.

It took Jones some years to convince the British Admiralty of the benefits of using the new flour in preference to the hard biscuits to which sailors were accustomed. Jones emphasised the benefits to the sailors of having fresh bread throughout their voyages. Finally, in 1855, his flour was approved for use of participants in the Crimean War, partly at the behest of Florence Nightingale.

From 1864, he lived at Court House, Caldicot, Monmouthshire, where he died in 1891.

== Archives ==
Records concerning Jones' patent for self-raising flour are held at Bristol Archives (Ref. 29932) (online catalogue).

== See also ==
- Alfred Bird, inventor of Bird's custard and also the first baking powder in 1843
- August Oetker, German populariser of baking powder in 1891
