= Bad Schwartau =

- Town
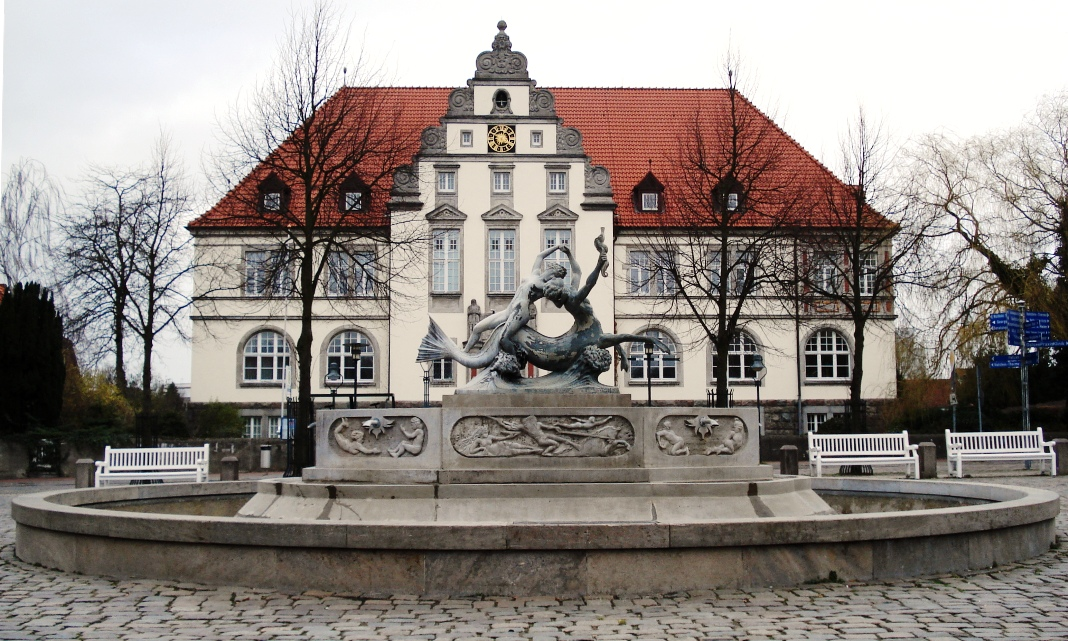
- Amtsgericht

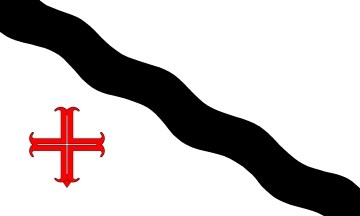
- Flag Coat of arms

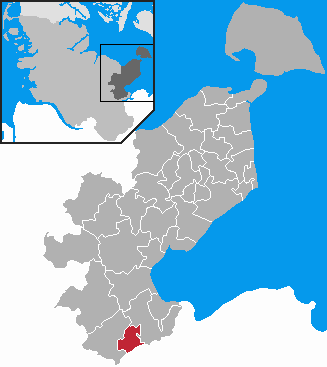
- Location of Bad Schwartau within Ostholstein district
- Interactive map of Bad Schwartau
- Location within Germany Location within Schleswig-Holstein
- Coordinates: 53°55′10″N 10°41′51″E
- Country: Germany
- State: Schleswig-Holstein
- District: Ostholstein

Government
  - Mayor: Katrin Engeln

Area
  - Total: 18.39 km^{2} (7.10 sq mi)
- Elevation: 8 m (26 ft)

Population (2025-12-31)
  - Total: 19,918
  - Density: 1,083/km^{2} (2,805/sq mi)
- Time zone: UTC+01:00 (CET)
  - Summer (DST): UTC+02:00 (CEST)
- Postal codes: 23611
- Dialling codes: 0451
- Vehicle registration: OH
- Website: www.bad-schwartau.de

Bad Schwartau (German pronunciation: [baːt ˈʃvaʁtaʊ]; Low German: Bad Swartau) is the largest city in the district of Ostholstein, in Schleswig-Holstein, Germany. It is situated on the river Trave and the Schwartau creek, approximately 5 kilometres (3.1 mi) north of the Hanseatic City of Lübeck. Bad Schwartau is a spa-city, well known for its iodide saline waters. The city is located about 13 kilometres (8.1 mi) from the Baltic Sea.

== Economy and Infrastructure ==
–

Bad Schwartau

General information
- Platforms: 2

Services
Preceding station	DB Regio Nord	Following station
Lübeck Hbf Terminus	RB 85	Timmendorfer Strand towards Neustadt (Holst)
Preceding station		Following station
Eutin towards Kiel Hbf	RE 83	Lübeck Hbf towards Lüneburg
Location

Bad Schwartau is best known for its food industry. The largest employer is the company Schwartauer Werke which is owned by Dr. Oetker. Another economic focus is the healthcare sector.

There is a railway station in Bad Schwartau along the Kiel–Lübeck railway and the Lübeck–Puttgarden railway. The two railways go together as double track from Lübeck and split from each other 1.5 kilometres (0.93 mi) north of the station. As part of the improvement and rebuilding of the Lübeck–Puttgarden railway, the station would be built, around 2025, on lower level so the two nearby level crossings can let those streets cross on bridges over the railway.

== Sport ==
The most important sports club in the city is VfL Bad Schwartau, whose men's handball team played in the handball national league. In 2002, the Bundesliga license was taken over by HSV Hamburg. This was followed by relegation to the handball regional league Northeast. Since the 2007/2008 season, VfL has been playing in the second handball Bundesliga again. Since the 2017/18 season, the team has competed as VfL Lübeck-Schwartau.

== Notable people ==
=== Sons and daughters of the town ===
- Wolfram Kühn (born 1952), former Vice Admiral of the German Navy and deputy Inspector General of the Bundeswehr
- Gerd-Volker Schock (born 1950), football player and coach
- Karl Schultz (born 1937), equestrian, Olympian in eventing 1972 and 1976

=== Personalities who live or lived in Bad Schwartau ===
- Emanuel Geibel (1815–1884), German poet and playwright
- Erich Rudorffer (1917–2016), German Luftwaffe fighter ace
- Sandra Völker (born 1974), swimmer, freestyle and backstroke
