= Thomas Kellein =

German art historian (1955–2025)

- Born: 1955; Nuremberg, Bavaria, West Germany
- Died: 22 September 2025 (aged 70); Berlin, Germany
- Education: University of Hamburg
- Known for: Art curation, gallery director

Thomas Kellein (1955 – 22 September 2025) was a German art historian, gallery director, author and curator. He was the Director at Kunsthalle Basel between 1988 and 1995, and the Director of the Kunsthalle Bielefeld between 1996 and 2010. He was the Director of the Chinati Foundation between 2011 and 2012.

== Background ==
Kellein was born in 1955 in Nuremberg, Bavaria, West Germany. During his school years, Kellein lived in Hanover, Germany and studied art history, philosophy and literature in Berlin, Hamburg and Marburg.

In 1982, Kellein received his doctorate degree from the University of Hamburg. His dissertation was published by Gerd Hatje in the book, Sputnikschock und Mondlandung: Künstlerische Großprojekte von Yves Klein zu Christo (1989), and additional sections appeared in his catalogue, Walter de Maria: 5 Kontinente Skulptur (1989).

Kellein died after a serious illness in Berlin, on 22 September 2025, at the age of 70.

== Career ==
=== Early beginnings ===
In 1982, he was appointed curator of the Staatsgalerie Stuttgart, where he directed the International Archive for Intermedia Arts founded by Hanns Sohm in 1945. Later he curated exhibitions, with Ad Reinhardt and then with Walter de Maria.

=== Kunsthalle Basel, 1988–1996 ===
In 1988, Kellein was appointed Director of the Kunsthalle Basel, where he curated exhibitions of Mark Rothko, Clyfford Still, Andy Warhol, Roni Horn, Mike Kelley, John McCracken, Cindy Sherman, Hiroshi Sugimoto, and Rachel Whiteread. He also organized thematic projects like “The 21st Century” or “World Morality: Ideas of Morality in Contemporary Art.” Several of his exhibitions traveled from Basel to various European countries and to the United States.

During his years in Basel, Kellein was guest curator at Watari-Um in Tokyo, at the Royal Academy of Arts in London and at Haus der Kunst in Munich. There, in 1995, he curated the historically comprehensive exhibition “Pierrot: Melancholy and Mask.” Between 1982 and 1996 he was part-time lecturer and Professor for Art History at the Philipps-Universität Marburg, the Kunstakademie Stuttgart, and the Universities of Stuttgart and Freiburg. With the help of the architectural firm Zwimpfer Partner, Kellein invited Donald Judd to Basel in 1991, where the sculptor developed the design of the façade of the Bahnhof Ost railroad station.

=== Kunsthalle Bielefeld, 1996–2010 ===
From 1996 to 2010, Kellein served as Director of the Kunsthalle Bielefeld, turning the municipal Art Museum into a nonprofit operating company. In Bielefeld he curated solo exhibitions by Alvar and Aino Alto, Vanessa Beecroft, Louise Bourgeois, George Condo, Paul Delvaux, Fang Lijun, Caspar David Friedrich, Adam Fuss, Donald Judd (which later travelled to the Menil Collection), Ilya and Emilia Kabakov, Jeff Koons, Henri Laurens, Robert Longo, Kasimir Malevich, Yoko Ono, Pablo Picasso, Rirkit Tiravanija and Not Vital. Among his thematic projects were “1937: Perfection and Destruction,” “1968: The Great Innocence,” and “The 80s Revisited: The Bischofberger Collection.” Many publications related to the listed exhibitions, including the ones in Basel, were issued by well-known German publishing houses. There were a large number of English publications as well.

In 1997 Kellein initiated the state-sponsored project “Garden Landscape OstWestfalenLippe” in public and private gardens and parks of the region. From 2000 to 2010 the project involved up to six different spatial installations a year. Among the participating gardeners and artists were Georg Baselitz, Gilles Clément, George Condo, Richard Deacon, Olafur Eliasson, Jenny Holzer, Ilya and Emilia Kabakov, Anish Kapoor, Jonathan Meese, Christiane Möbus, Piet Oudolf, Tobias Rehberger, Thomas Schütte, Martha Schwartz, Yutaka Sone and Jan Vercruysse. Several of the spatial installations, such as those by Jenny Holzer in the palace grounds of Reder, are accessible as permanent installations. In the Gräflicher Park Bad Driburg, the “Piet Oudolf Garden” has been open to the public since 2009.

In 2003, Kellein chaired the jury that awarded the Museum Ludwig's Wolfgang Hahn Prize to Niele Toroni.

=== Later career ===
From 2011 until 2012, Kellein served as Director of the Chinati Foundation in Marfa, Texas. The 340-acre estate comprises more than thirty buildings, which the American sculptor Donald Judd (1928–1994), through grants since 1979 from the Dia Art Foundation, filled with art installations to found his own museum. After just 15 months, Kellein resigned from his position as director; he continued to serve as a consultant for another six months.

From 2012 to 2013 Kellein was an independent art advisor. Starting in 2013, he was Director of Art Consult at Bergos Berenberg AG in Zurich, a Swiss private bank. In 2015, Kellein gave testimony in the court case connected to Berenberg Art Advice (a now dissolved subsidiary of the private Berenberg Bank), because his former co-worker, art dealer Helge Achenbach was accused of defrauding customers through hidden premiums.

== Publications ==
A list of select exhibition catalogues and book publications, in descending order by year of publishing.

=== Books ===
- Kellein, Thomas (1984). Ad Reinhardt Schriften und Gesprache [Ad Reinhardt Writings and Conversations] (in German). Munich, Germany: Verlag Silke Schreiber. ISBN 9783889600066.
- Lax, Robert (1988). Kellein, Thomas (ed.). 33 Poems (New Directions). New Directions. ISBN 9780811210492.
- Kellein, Thomas (1989). Sputnik-Schock und Mondlandung: Künstlerische Grossprojekte von Yves Klein zu Christo. Stuttgart, Germany: Gerd Hatje. ISBN 978-3775702843.
- Kellein, Thomas; Hendricks, Jon (1995). Flux. London, UK: Thames & Hudson. ISBN 9780500974223.
- Roth, Dieter; Dobke, Dirk; Kellein, Thomas (2004). Dieter Roth: Books + Multiples. Volume 3 of Dieter Roth, Dieter Roth, 1930-1998. London, UK: Edition Hansjorg Mayer. ISBN 9780500976302.
- Kellein, Thomas (2007). George Maciunas: The Dream of Fluxus. New York City, NY: Thames & Hudson. ISBN 9780500976654.
- Kellein, Thomas (2010). The 80s Revisited: From The Bischofberger Collection. Cologne, Germany: DuMont Buchverlag. ISBN 978-3832193485.
- Longo, Robert; Fowle, Kate; Kellein, Thomas; Foster, Hal (2012). Robert Longo: Charcoal. Stuttgart, Germany: Hatje Cantz. ISBN 9783775731966.

=== Exhibition catalogues ===
- Reinhardt, Ad; Kellein, Thomas; Gudrun, Inboden (1985). Ad Reinhardt. Staatsgalerie Stuttgart 13.4 - 2.6.1985 (exhibition catalogue). Stuttgart, Germany: Staatsgalerie Stuttgart.
- Kellein, Thomas (1986). Fröhliche Wissenschaft: das Archiv Sohm (exhibition catalogue). Stuttgart, Germany: Staatsgalerie Stuttgart.
- Kellein, Thomas (1987). Walter de Maria: 5 Kontinente Skulptur, mit Essays zum Werk des Künstlers (exhibition catalogue) (in German). Staatsgalerie Stuttgart. Stuttgart, Germany: Hatje. ISBN 978-3775702881.
- Rothko, Mark; Kellein, Thomas (1989). Mark Rothko: Kaaba in New York (exhibition catalogue). Kunsthalle Basel. ISBN 9783855620203.
- Kellein, Thomas (1990). Ian Hamilton Finlay: Ausstellung, Kunsthalle Basel, 4.2.-16.4.1990 (exhibition catalogue). Basel, Switzerland: Kunsthalle Basel.
- Kellein, Thomas, ed. (1992). Clyfford Still, 1904-1980: The Buffalo and San Francisco Collection (exhibition catalogue). Thomas Kellein (contribution), Michael Auping (contribution), Susan Landauer (contribution), Patricia Still (contribution). Munich, Germany: Prestel-Verlag. ISBN 9783791311876.
- Kellein, Thomas; Kelly, Mike (1992). Mike Kelley (exhibition catalogue). Translated by Nusser, Uta. Kunsthalle Basel, Institute of Contemporary Arts (London, England), Viola Grunder (Editor), Iwona Blazwick (Editor). Germany: Edition Cantz. ISBN 978-3893224500.
- Warhol, Andy; Angell, Callie (1993). Kellein, Thomas (ed.). Andy Warhol Abstrakt: Ausstellung in der Kunsthalle Basel, 19.9.-14.11.1993 (exhibition catalogue). Prestel Verlag. ISBN 9783791313320.
- Horn, Roni; Kellein, Thomas (1995). Making Being Here Enough: Installations from 1980 to 1995 (exhibition catalogue). Volumes 5 - 1995 of Katalog, Kestner-Gesellschaft Hannover. Kunsthalle Basel. ISBN 9783796599019.
- Whiteread, Rachel; Kellein, Thomas (1995). Rachel Whiteread Sculpture, Skulpturen (exhibition catalogue) (in German and English). Philadelphia, PA: Institute of Contemporary Art, University of Pennsylvania, The British Council of Philadelphia.
- Kellein, Thomas (1995). Hiroshi Sugimoto: Time Exposed. Thames & Hudson. ISBN 9780500974278.
- Lueg, Konrad; Kellein, Thomas (1999). Ich nenne mich as Maler Konrad Lueg [When I paint my name is Konrad Lueg] (exhibition catalogue) (in German). Kunsthalle Bielefeld, Museum of Contemporary Art in Gent, P.S. 1 New York.
- Kellein, Thomas (2002). Jeff Koons: Pictures, 1980–2002 (exhibition catalogue). Kunsthalle Bielefeld. Cologne, Germany: Distributed Art Publishers (DAP), Verlag der Buchhandlung Walther König. ISBN 9781891024610.
- Kellein, Thomas (2002). Donald Judd: 1955-1968 (exhibition catalogue). Kunsthalle Bielefeld, Menil Collection. Cologne, Germany: Distributed Art Publishers (DAP), Verlag der Buchhandlung Walther König. ISBN 9783883755793.
- Kellein, Thomas (2004). Vanessa Beecroft: Photographs, Films, Drawings (exhibition catalogue). Kunsthalle Bielefeld. Berlin, Germany: Hatje Cantz Publishers. ISBN 9783775715089.
- Kabakov, Ilya; Kabakov, Emilia (2005). Kellein, Thomas (ed.). Ilya And Emilia Kabakov: The Utopian City And Other Projects (in English and German). Kerber. ISBN 978-3936646894.
- Kellein, Thomas (2005). Kellein, Thomas (ed.). George Condo: One Hundred Women (exhibition catalogue). Salzburger Landessammlungen Rupertinum, Kunsthalle Bielefeld, Agnes Husslein-Arco (editor). Hatje Cantz. ISBN 9783775716260.
- Kellein, Thomas (2009). Yoko Ono: Between the Sky and My Head (exhibition catalogue). Verlag der Buchhandlung Walther König. ISBN 978-3865605313.
- Tiravanija, Rirkrit (2010). Kellein, Thomas (ed.). Rirkrit Tiravanija, Cook Book (exhibition catalogue: Rirkrit Tiravanija: Just Smile and Don't Talk). London, UK: Edition Hansjorg Mayer. ISBN 9786167339061.
- Kellein, Thomas; Riedel, David (2011). Picasso: 1905 in Paris; Katalog zur Ausstellung in Bielefeld, 25.09-2011-15.01.2012 (exhibition catalogue). Hirmer Verlag. ISBN 978-3777444710.
