= Richard Kaselowsky (died 1921) =

Richard Kaselowsky (16 June 1852 - 6 April 1921) was a German entrepreneur and deputy in the Prussian state parliament. His son was also Richard Kaselowsky.

== Early life and family ==
Richard Kaselowsky was born on 16 June 1852. He married Elise Pauline, born Delius (1862-1921), on 7 October 1887. She came from the textile producer family of the same name. The couple had a daughter and two sons, one of them the industrialist Richard Kaselowsky.

== Career ==
Kaselowsky was among the financially and politically influential citizens of Bürgern Bielefelds. He was a merchant in Bad Nauheim. From 1894 he belonged to the supervisory board of the forward mill and became a shareholder of the company Nikolaus Dürkopps. From 1876 to 1896 he was commercial director there. In this position, he had a decisive influence on the industrial machinery sewing machines, bicycles, cash registers, cars, etc. in the 1890s. After leaving the Dürkopp plants, he was deputy chairman of the supervisory board. In 1900 he was a founding member of E. Gundlach A.-G. and also belonged to the Supervisory Board there.

From 1899 to 1903 he was a nationalliberal deputy in the Prussian Landtag and lived with his family in Berlin.
