= Arend Oetker =

German entrepreneur, economist and art collector (born 1939)

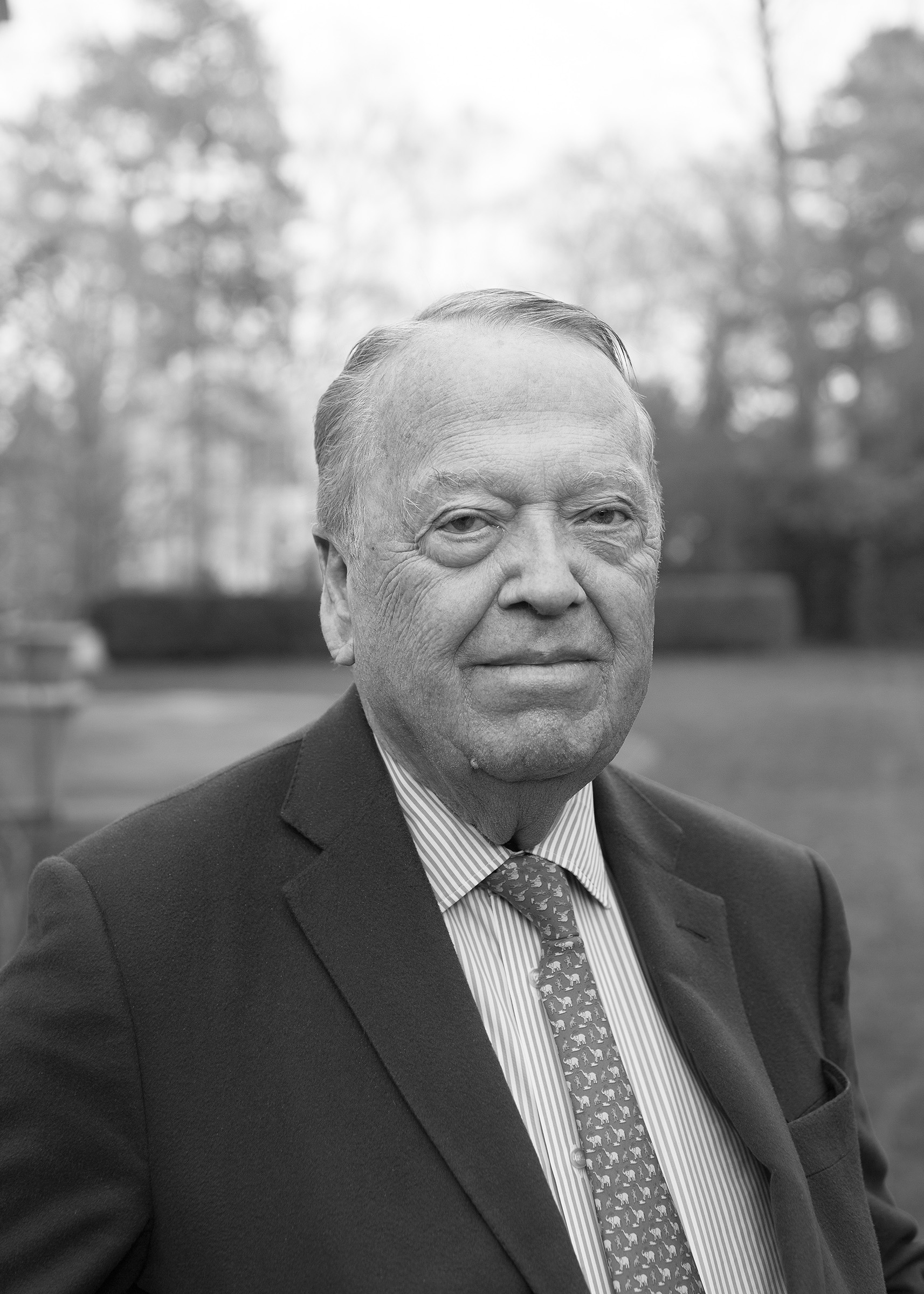
- Oetker portrayed by Oliver Mark in 2019

Honorary President of Federation of German Industries

Personal details
- Born: Arend Heinrich Rudolf Oetker; 30 March 1939 (age 87) Bielefeld, Germany
- Party: Christian Democratic Union
- Spouse: Brigitte Conzen (m. 1975)
- Relations: Oetker family
- Children: 5
- Parent: Ursula Oetker (mother)
- Education: University of Cologne (PhD); Harvard Business School
- Occupation: Businessman, philanthropist

Arend Heinrich Rudolf Oetker (born 30 March 1939) is a German businessman, philanthropist and heir of the Oetker family. He serves as honorary president of the Federation of German Industries.

== Early life and education ==
Oetker was born 30 March 1939 in Bielefeld, Germany, the oldest of five children, to Heinrich Oetker, a farmer originally from Wiedensahl in Lower Saxony, and Ursula Oetker (née Oetker; 1915–2005), of the Oetker family. He had four siblings; Renate Ranebach (née Oetker; born 1940), Ernst-August Oetker (1941–2016), Regine Oetker (1944–2022) and Roland Karl Theodor Oetker (born 1949).

He was raised at Hornoldendorf Manor near Detmold. He completed his Abitur at the Gymnasium Leopoldinium in Detmold. In 1960, after completed military service, he completed a commercial apprenticeship, at Münchmeyer & Co. in Hamburg. Ultimately he studied Political science in Hamburg, Berlin and Cologne, graduating with a PhD from the University of Cologne in 1967. He also attended Harvard Business School.

== Career ==
In 1967, Oetker entered Schwartauer Werke, which was part of his mothers inheritance. He currently is the chairman of Dr. Arend Oetker Holding GmbH & Co KG which holds numerous participations, most notably at Schwartauer Werke and Swiss-based Hero.

== Personal life ==
Oetker is married to Brigitte Oetker (née Conzen). They have five children;

He is a colonel (Hauptmann) of the German army reserve.
