= Schwartauer Werke =

German food company

- Type: Private
- Industry: Food
- Founded: 1899; 127 years ago in Bad Schwartau, Germany
- Number of employees: 950 (2024)
- Parent: Hero Group
- Website: www.schwartauer-werke.de

Schwartauer Werke (colloquially Schwartauer) is a German food manufacturing company based in Schleswig-Holstein. Over 950 employees work at its headquarteres in Bad Schwartau, Germany. Founded in 1899 it manufactures jams, spreads, dessert products, sirups and muesli and protein bars. In the 1960's, Ursula Oetker inherited the company and it was later, under the management of her son Arend Oetker, turned into a market leader Since 2002, Schwartauer was integrated into Hero Group (which is owned by Dr. Arend Oetker Holding GmbH & Co KG).

== History ==
=== Company Founding ===
The company was founded in 1899 by the brothers Paul (* February 27, 1871 in Rostock) and Otto Fromm (* August 8, 1872 in Rostock; † August 15, 1915 in Berlin) as a general partnership under the name "Chemische Fabrik Schwartau". In the early years, artificial honey, cranberry compote, and plum jam were produced, as well as floor wax and floor oil. In 1904, a jam production department was established. In 1907, a sugar refinery was founded and from then on, the company focused on the production of fruit-based products.

With the change in the product range, the company name was changed from the Chemical Factory to the "Schwartauer Honigwerke & Zuckerraffinerie Aktiengesellschaft" in 1912. In order to transport the raw food products as quickly as possible to the factory for further processing and sale, a railway connection was created. Also in 1912, Schwartau released its first jam on the market, the Schwartau Five-Fruit Jams. During the First World War, Schwartau benefited from the wartime economic boom and was able to distribute dividends in the double-digit percentage range. At the same time, however, the Schwartau factories also had to cope with a shortage of labor and the raw material sugar. After Otto Fromm died in 1915 and his brother Paul had left the company, board members Gerhard Blümer and Franz Schrader took over the management.

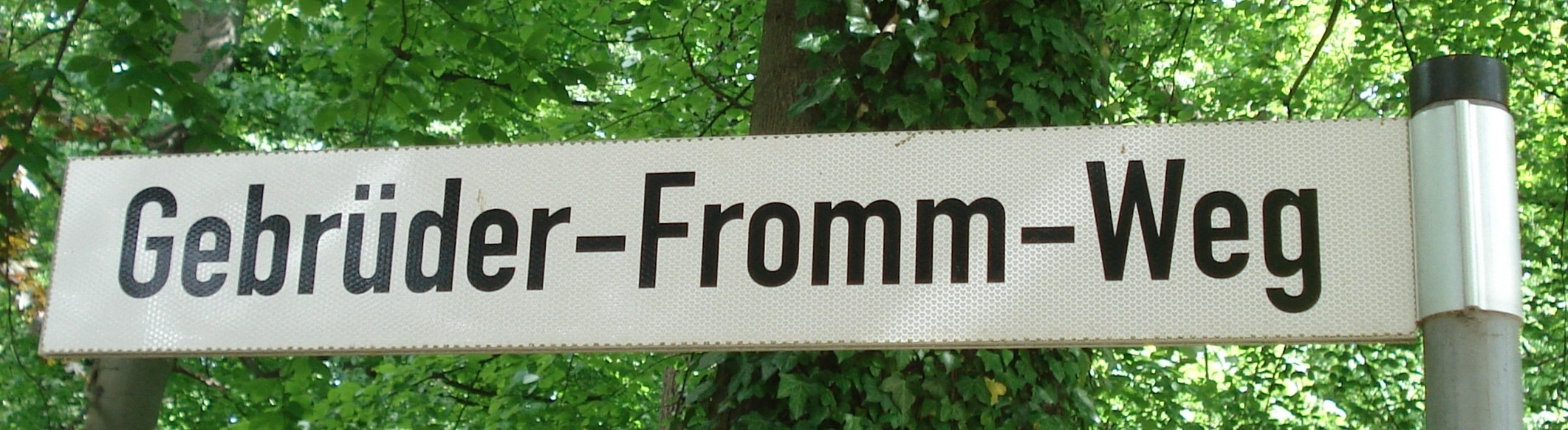
The brothers Paul and Otto Fromm are considered the founders of the Schwartauer Werke

=== Weimar Republic and National Socialism ===
In 1922, the subsidiaries "Lübecker Pralinen- und Konfitürenfabrik GmbH" (Lübecker Pralinen- und Konfitürenfabrik GmbH) for jams and pralines and "Lübecker Marzipan- und Backmassenfabrik GmbH" (Lumaba) for marzipan and baking mixtures were founded. In 1924, another subsidiary, "Mablo-Werke GmbH," was founded, which was intended to both promote its own raw paste and specifically attract customers from the processing industry. Also in 1924, Fritz Sierig became a member of the board of directors, and until his death in 1953, was the company's long-term managing director.

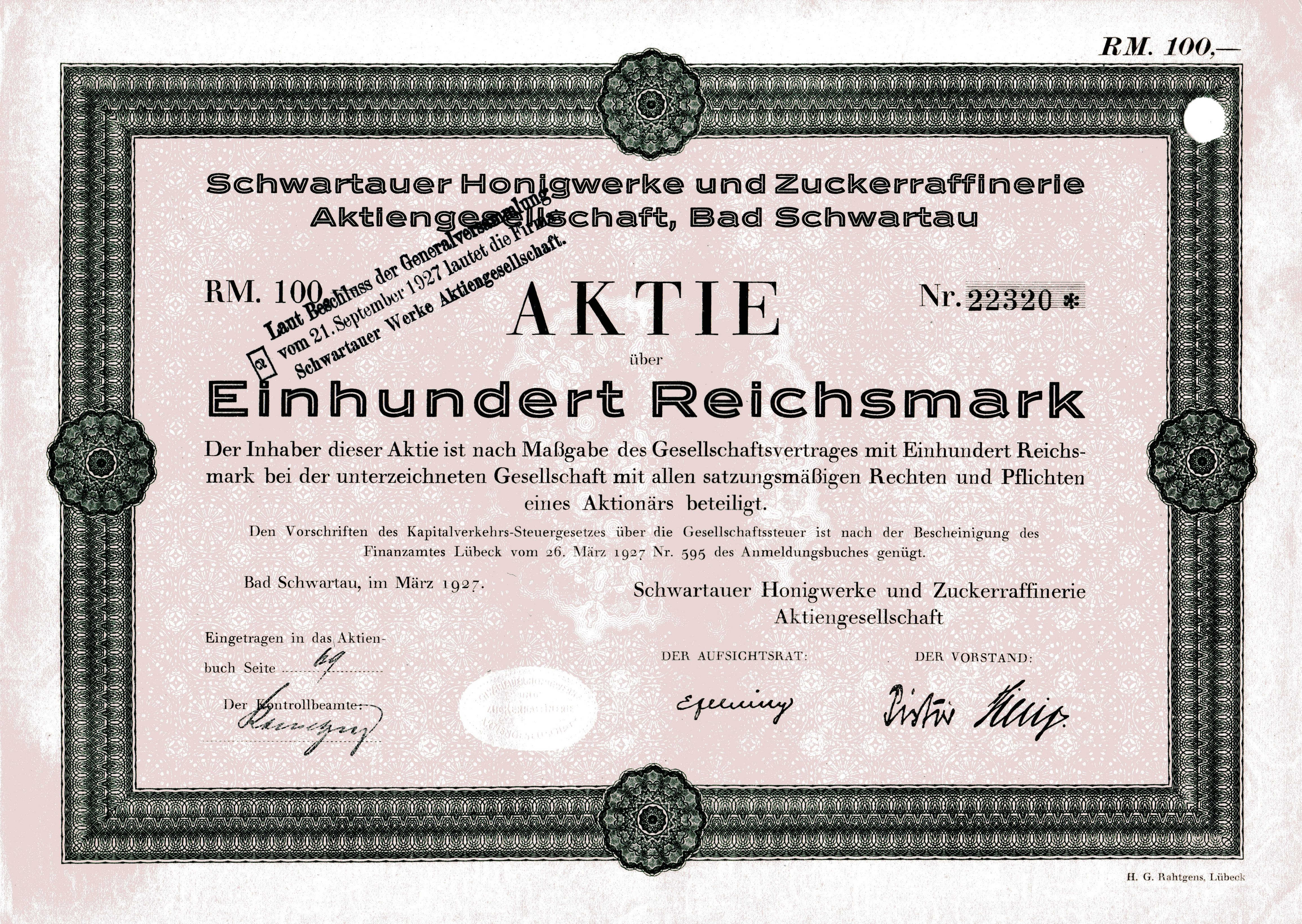
Share of 100 RM of the Schwartauer Honigwerke und Zuckerraffinerie AG from March 1927 with a stamp imprint from September 1927 with the new company name "Schwartauer Werke AG"

In 1924, the artist Alfred Mahlau designed the trademark of Schwartauer Werke, the towers of the five churches ("Seven Towers") of Bad Schwartau's neighbouring town of Lübeck, seen from north to south: St. James' Church, St. Mary's Church, St. Peter's Church, St. Aegidien Church, and Lübeck Cathedral.

In 1927, Schwartauer Werke, the Lübeck Marzipan and Baking Mass Factory, and the Lübeck Praline and Jam Factory were merged to create Schwartauer Werke AG. The company survived the Great Depression by reducing jam prices, financed by reduced wages for employees and the board of directors, and other savings.

During the Nazi era, Schwartauer Werke AG also employed forced laborers. They had their own civilian labour camp with around 110 inmates. Jam was promoted by the Nazis as a "people's spread," and in the 1930s, Schwartauer Werke was steered toward self-sufficiency for the impending Second World War.

Towards the end of the Second World War, production declined sharply due to raw material shortages, but the Schwartauer Werke buildings remained undamaged by bombing raids.

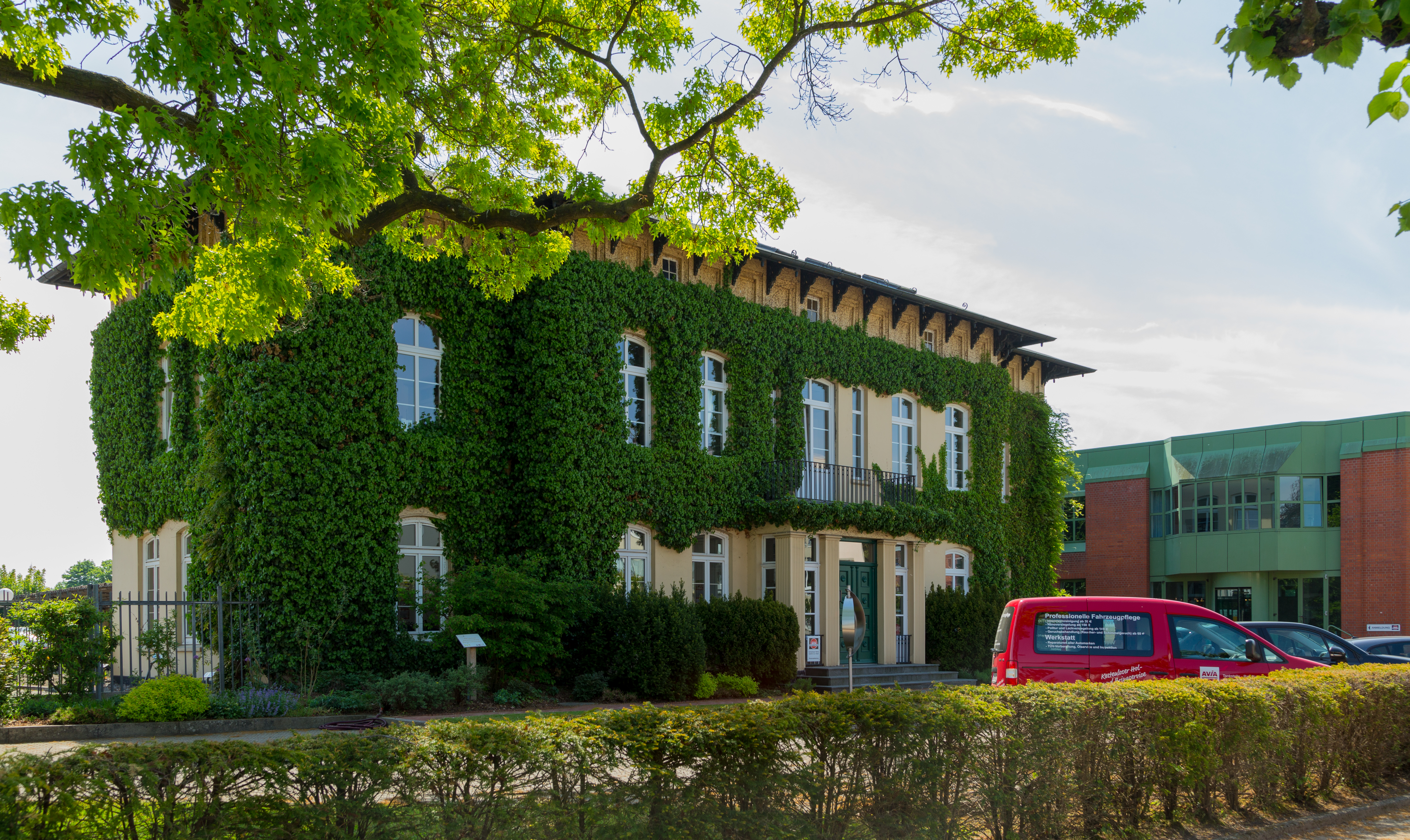
Administration and reception building of the Schwartauer Werke, Lübecker Straße

=== Postwar period ===
In the postwar period, the company increased its workforce from around 500 people in 1950 to up to 1,000 people during the harvest season at the end of the 1950s. Among its products, the jam business was more successful than other branches of the company and ultimately became its core business. Between 1950 and 1961, the company's sales doubled to approximately 58.5 million German marks.

In 1959, the company was converted into a GmbH (limited liability company), whereby the Oetker family, which had already held shares in Schwartauer AG since the 1930s, acquired a majority stake in the company. In 1962, Schwartauer Werke introduced Schwartau Extra jam, which is still sold today. However, in the first half of the 1960s, the company's growth faltered.

Through inheritance, Ursula Oetker became the sole shareholder of Schwartauer Werke in the mid-1960s. At that time, however, the company was largely unprofitable and considered a restructuring case.

=== Modernization and Internationalization under Arend Oetker ===
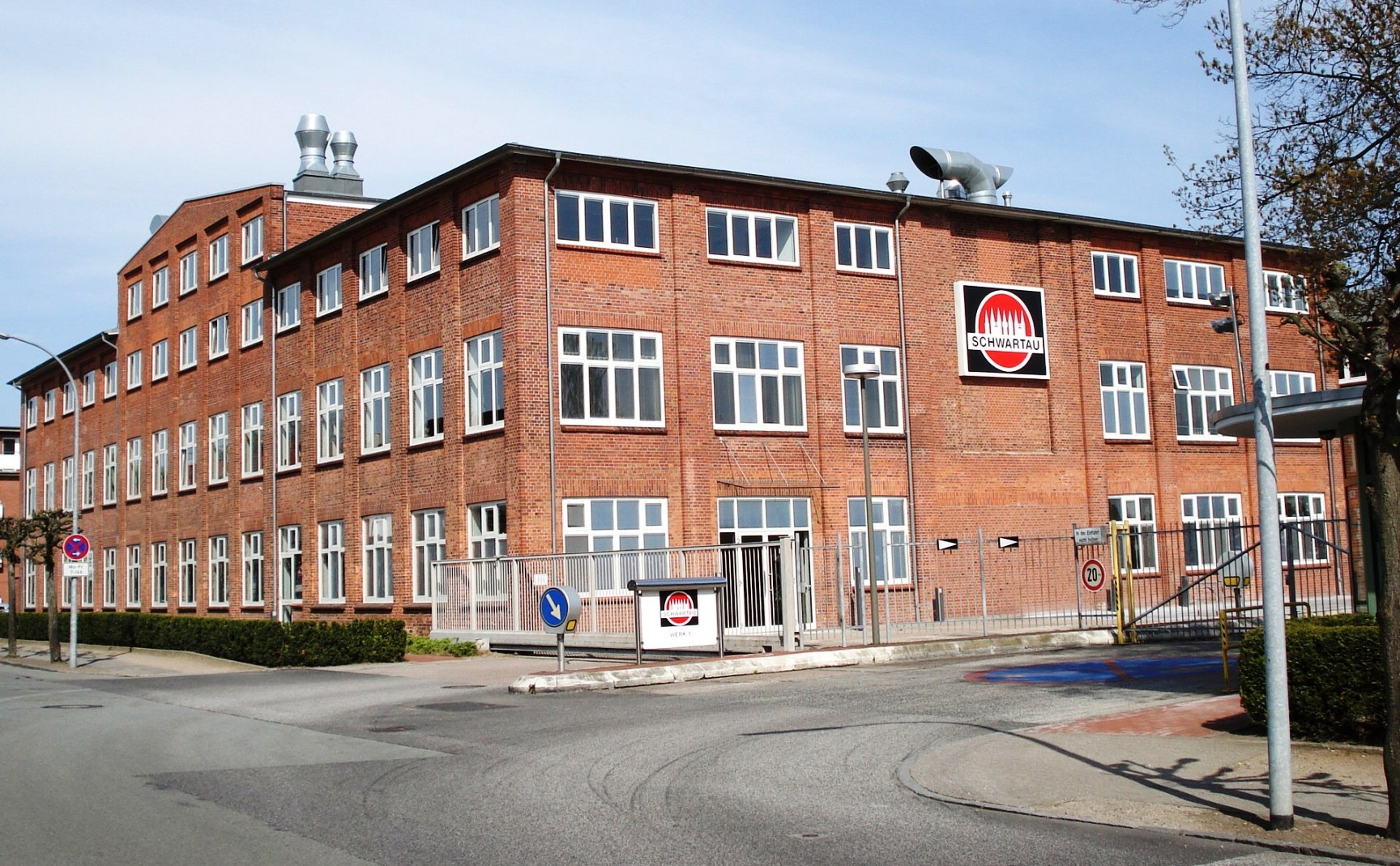
Plant 1 on Lübecker Straße in Bad Schwartau.

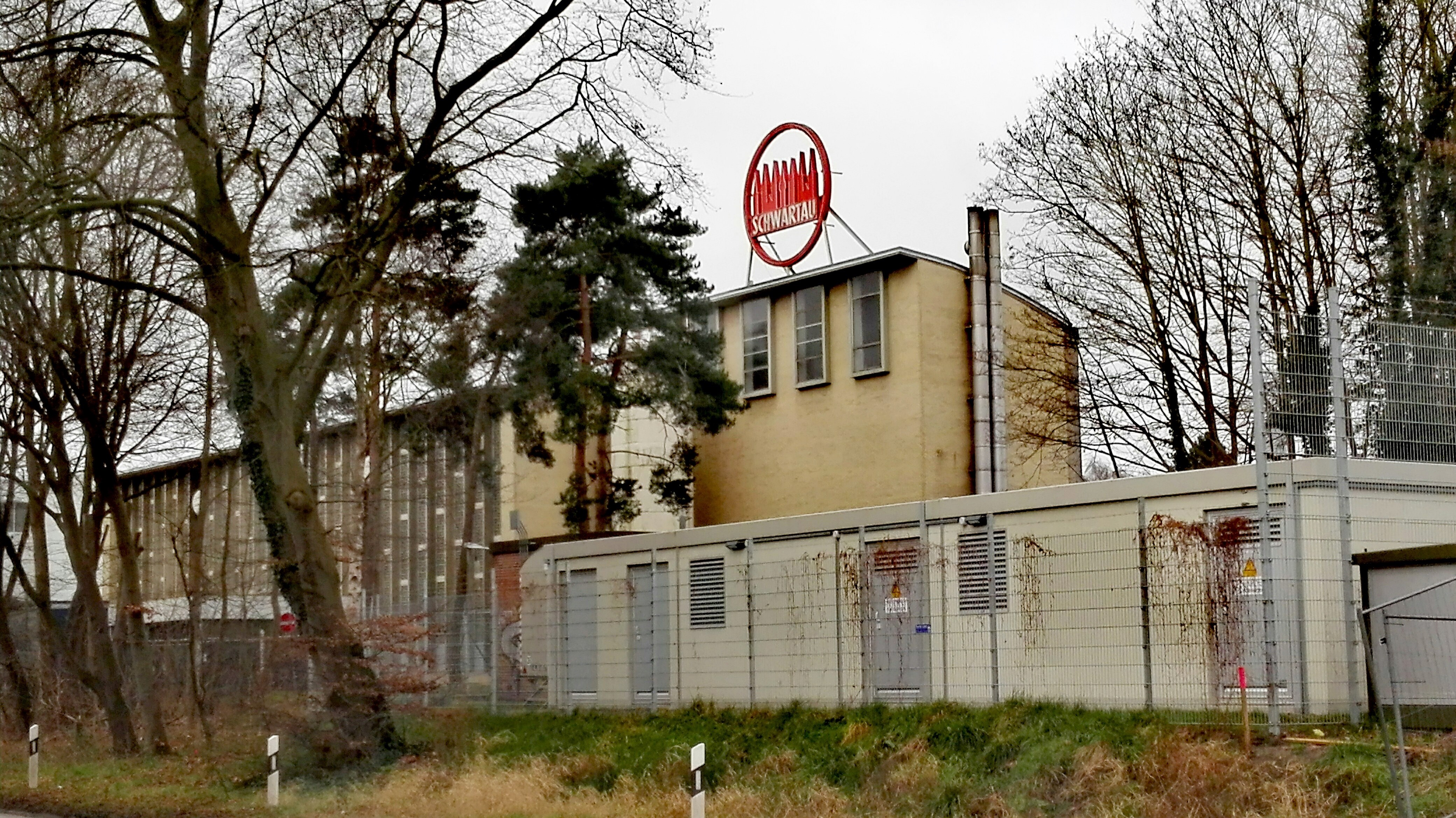
Another production facility on Lübecker Straße near the Leibniz Gymnasium.

In 1968, Ursula Oetker's son, Arend Oetker, took over the company and the chairmanship of the management of Schwartauer Werke. Under his leadership, Schwartauer Werke was restructured and became more internationally oriented. He also improved Schwartauer Werke's positioning as a manufacturer of branded goods. Within the next twenty years, the company increased its sales tenfold. From the 1970s onward, the company's management consisted of Arend Oetker, Werner Holm, and Lutz Peters for almost 30 years, until the latter two left the operational business in 2002.

In 1981, production of a muesli bar began, which has been sold under the Corny brand since 1984. Schwartauer Werke was one of the first European companies to introduce muesli bars from the United States. The muesli bars are produced in the so-called Corny factory in Bad Schwartau.

In 1986, Schwartauer Werke acquired a license to use the Mövenpick name for fruit spreads and established it as a premium brand in the German market. In August 2004, the contract between Schwartauer Werke and Mövenpick was extended long term. In 1986, construction began on the Schwartau advertising tower, which was completed in May 1987. To this day, the tower remains the landmark of Schwartauer Werke.

In 1995, Schwartauer Werke acquired a majority stake in the Swiss food manufacturer Hero AG, which already had several subsidiaries at the time. Both companies served different markets in Europe and the merger of the two was seen as economically beneficial.

At the company's 100th anniversary in 1999, Schwartauer Werke covered around 40 percent of the jam market in Germany. At that time, around 700,000 jars of jam were produced daily, which were exported to 35 countries. Sales revenues amounted to 2.7 billion German marks.

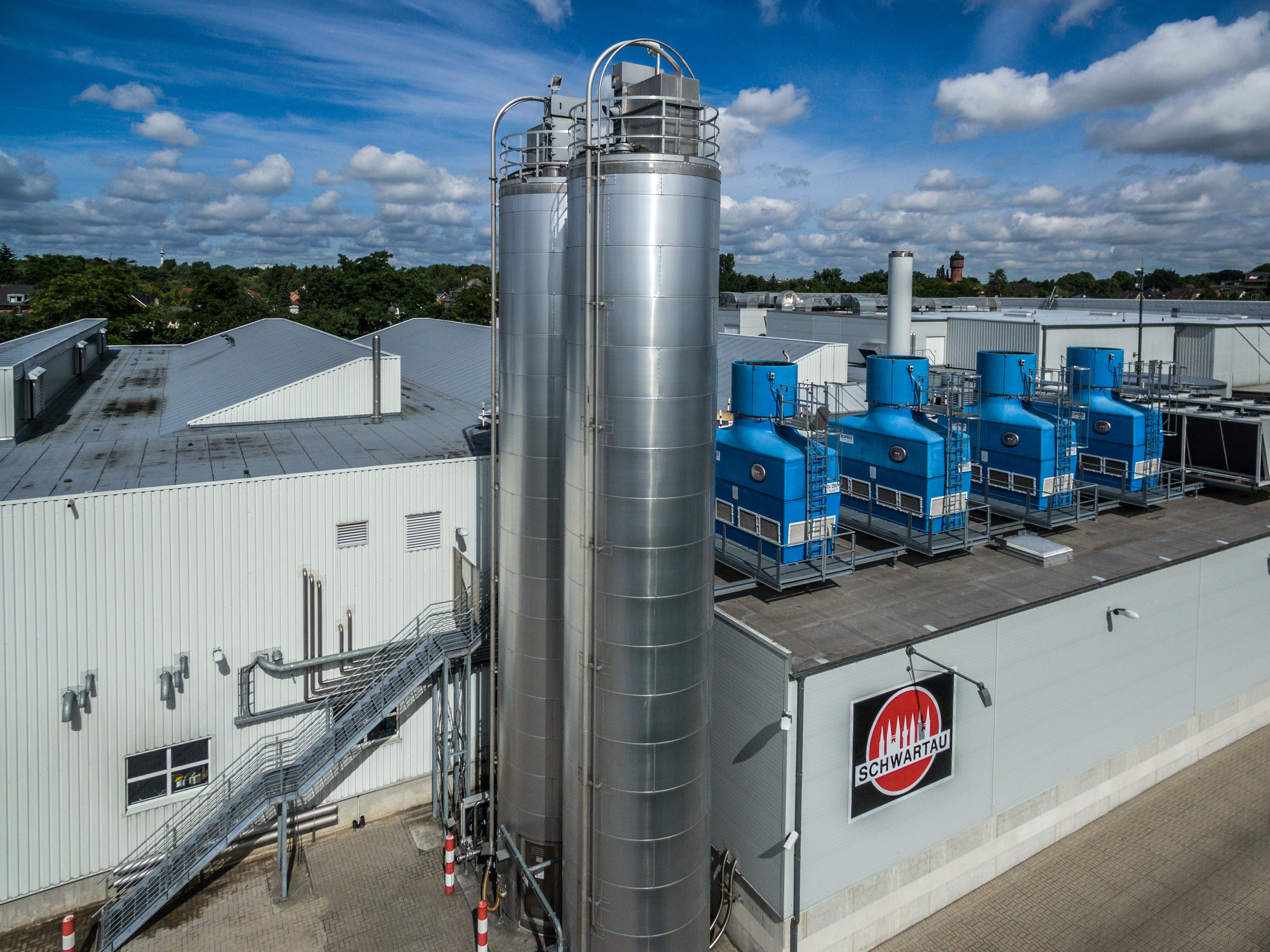
Production hall on the Schwartauer Werke factory premises (2017)

=== In the new millennium ===
Since 2002, Schwartauer Werke has been part of Hero AG, in which Arend Oetker holds a majority stake. Prior to this, the decision was made to incorporate Schwartauer Werke into the Hero Group, rather than the other way around, for economic and tax reasons. Since then, the company has been known as "Schwartauer Werke GmbH & Co. KGaA."

A research and development center was opened in June 2006. In 2012, the company expanded and opened a second jam factory at its Bad Schwartau site, investing €20 million.

Since 2012, Schwartauer Werke has offered a factory outlet, and in 2018, the factory outlet was relocated to downtown Bad Schwartau.

In 2016, it was announced that Schwartauer Werke wanted to open a new location to expand its production capacity and modernize production. Three other municipalities, in addition to Bad Schwartau, applied for the location. In 2018, it was decided to remain in Bad Schwartau with all production branches. However, a modernization of the Corny plant and an investment of a double-digit million amount in production and logistics were agreed upon. Construction began in 2018, and was completed in 2024, for the company's 125th anniversary. Among other things, a new social building with a canteen was built.

In 2024, the Bad Schwartau water tower, which is owned by Schwartauer Werke, was renovated. At the same time, the company expressed interest in selling it, as it had no use for it.

== Company structure ==
Since 2002, Schwartauer Werke has been part of the food manufacturer Hero AG in Lenzburg, Switzerland, in which long-time Schwartauer Werke owner Arend Oetker holds a majority stake. Several food brands are organized within the Hero AG group. Hero AG as a whole generated sales of approximately 1.22 billion Swiss francs in 2023, while Schwartauer Werke's sales are stated on its website at approximately 380 million euros (as of April 2024).

The company's management consists of Markus Kohrs-Lichte (CEO), Jörg Kehlen (Managing Director of Controlling, Finance and IT), and Thomas Sauermann (Managing Director of Supply Chain).

== Products ==
Schwartauer Werke produces jams, fruit spreads, jellies, and, in collaboration with Mövenpick, so-called "Gourmet Breakfast" jams. The company also produces muesli bars, dessert products, and food products such as red fruit compote and coffee syrups. A major division is the Corny muesli bar brand, which employed around 380 employees in 2023. Around 760 million bars were produced at Schwartauer Werke in 2023.

Schwartauer Werke primarily purchases its fruit in Europe for the production of jams, syrups, dessert products, and fruit bars. According to the company's 2022 Sustainability Report, 31% of the fruit came from Germany and around 95% from Europe. Exotic fruits, such as pineapples and mangoes, are sourced from countries outside Europe.

== Schwartauer Advertising Tower ==
In 1986/1987, the Schwartau Works built a 50-meter-high advertising tower ("Schwartau Advertising Tower") in the immediate vicinity of the A1 at the Bad Schwartau motorway junction (A1/A226). The tower was put into operation in May 1987 and is located on the grounds of a car dealership.

It is a hexagonal column (pylon) with a diameter of 4.50 meters, made of concrete, with a small platform at the top, on which the logo is located. The logo has a diameter of 10 meters. It is illuminated at night and rotates from 8 a.m. to 10 p.m. (1.6 times per minute). A red aviation beacon is located on the top. Due to its height and nighttime illumination, the tower is visible from afar and its exposed location has made the tower a landmark for the town of Bad Schwartau.

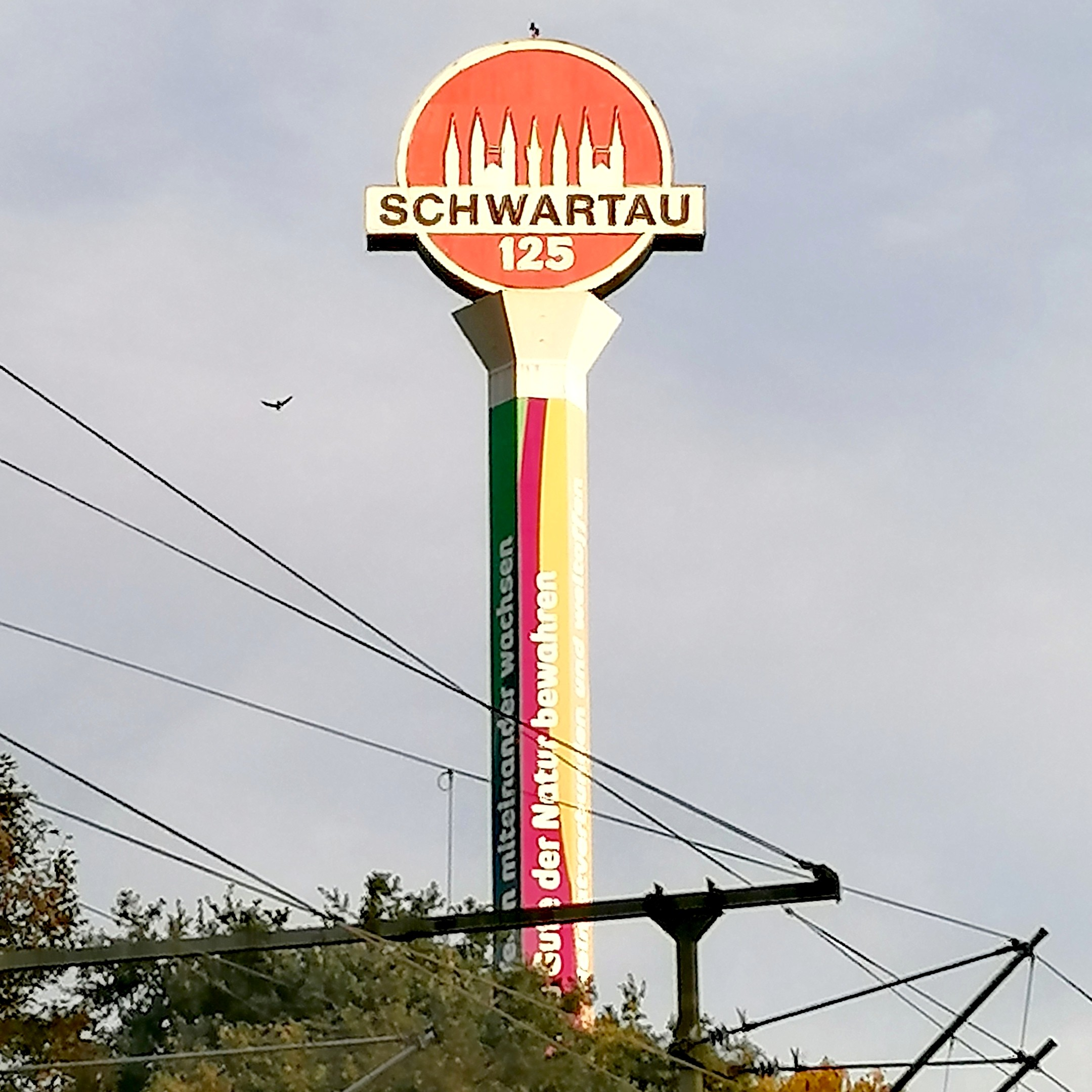
Advertising Pylon on the A1
