= Kunsthalle Bielefeld =

Art museum

Coordinates: 52°01′05″N 8°31′34″E

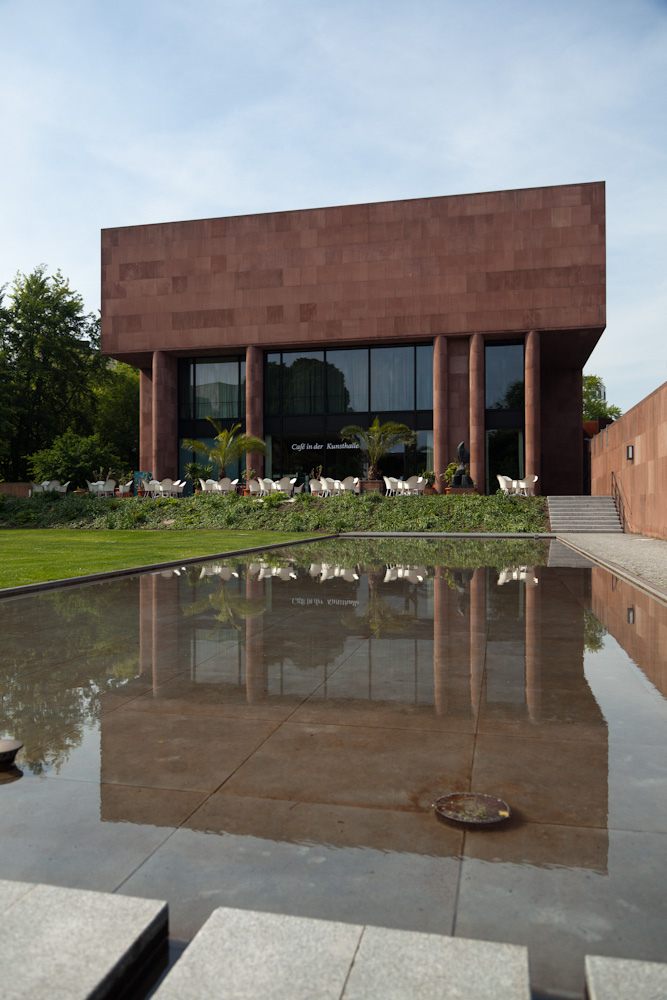
Kunsthalle Bielefeld by day.

Kunsthalle Bielefeld, North Rhine-Westphalia

The Kunsthalle Bielefeld is a modern and contemporary art museum in Bielefeld, Germany. It was designed by Philip Johnson in 1968, and paid for by the businessman, art patron, and former Waffen-SS officer Rudolf August Oetker.

== Collection and exhibitions ==
Initiated in 1950 with a donation by Oetker and gradually expanded from 1954 with municipal acquisitions, the collection focuses on Expressionism, international sculpture, and contemporary art. The permanent collection features a wide array of 20th-century art, including paintings by Pablo Picasso and Max Beckmann, works by the Blaue Reiter group and movements centred on László Moholy-Nagy and Oskar Schlemmer, and more recent art from the 1970s and '80s. The museum stands in a sculpture garden featuring works by Auguste Rodin, Henry Moore, Richard Serra, Thomas Schütte, Ólafur Elíasson and other modern sculptors.

At the 50th Venice Biennale in 2003, the Kunsthalle presented the documentary "Ilya und Emila Kabakov: Die Utopische Stadt. 1997-2003", which was on permanent display in the "Utopia Station Now!". As part of its series of exhibitions of important museum collections of twentieth- and twenty-first-century art, the Bundeskunsthalle Bonn presented »The Unknown Bielefeld Collection« in 2011.

The Kunsthalle also hosts temporary exhibitions to complement the permanent collection. Recent examples have been devoted to Emil Nolde, Rirkrit Tiravanija, and the locally born artist Peter August Böckstiegel together with Conrad Felixmüller. The 1991 exhibition "Picasso's Surrealism: 1925–1937", one of five internationally renowned Picasso exhibitions in 1984, 1988, 1993, and 2011, attracted 67,000 visitors; an exhibition in 2007–08, featuring art from 1937 in a variety of styles, had 47,000.

The museum also offers guided tours, teaching activities for children, and a library.

== Architecture ==
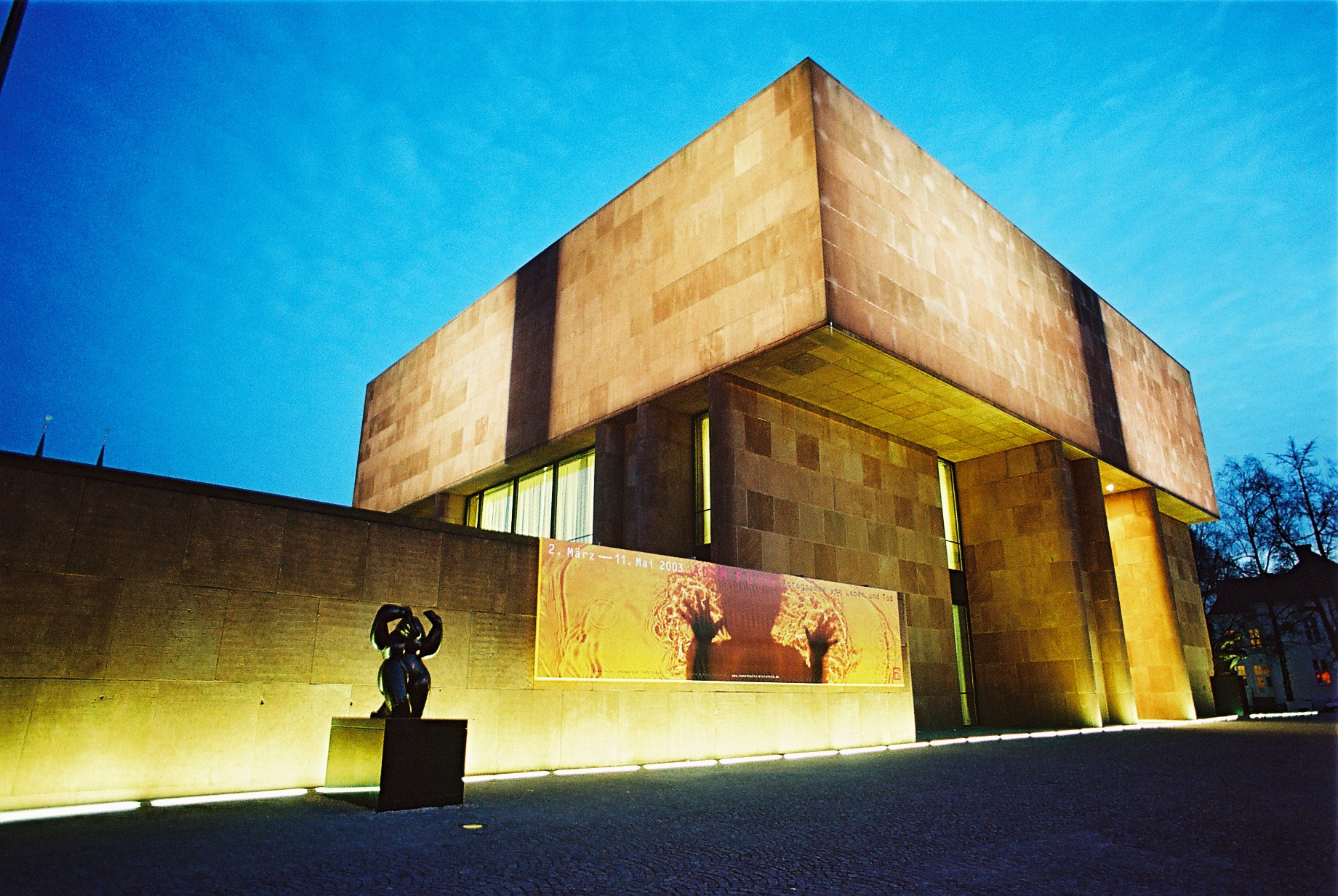
Kunsthalle Bielefeld by night.

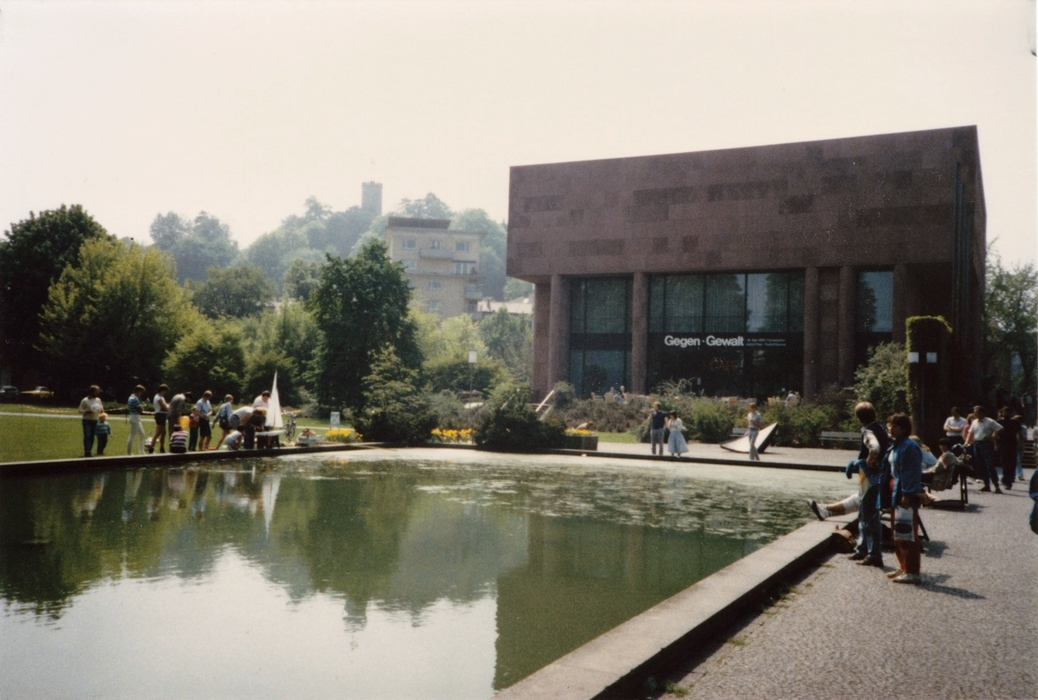
Former water basin in the Sculpture Garden (May 1985)

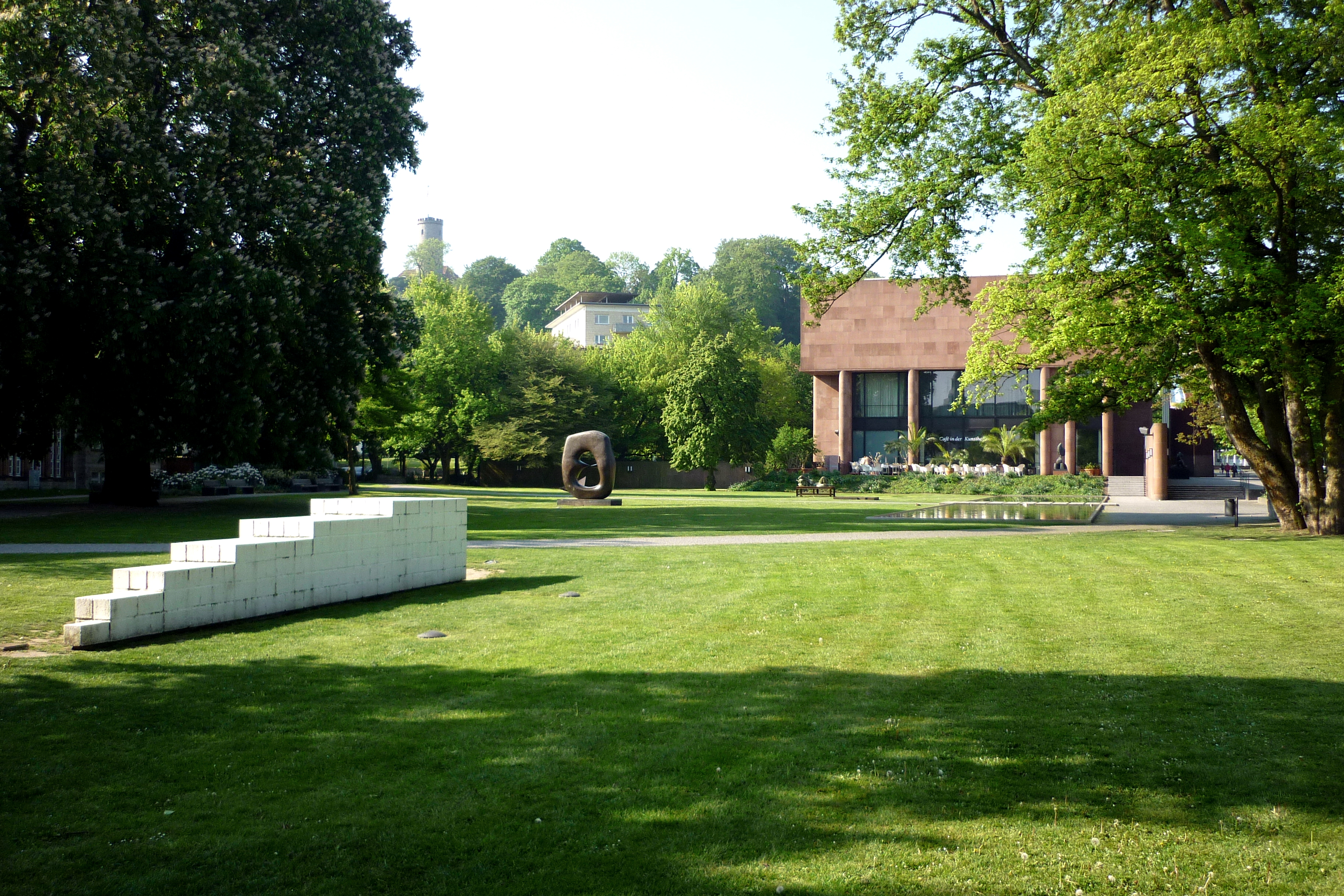
Sculpture Garden with sculptures by Sol LeWitt and Henry Moore

=== Original building ===
The museum is located on the south-west edge of Bielefeld's old town. It was built in 1968 by the American architect Philip Johnson in the International Style that he had founded, and is his only museum building in Europe. Johnson had been invited by the museum's director Joachim Wolfgang von Moltke and Rudolf August Oetker in 1965.

Cubic in shape and with a square ground level, it has three storeys above ground, two below, and a total exhibition space of 1,200 square metres (13,000 sq ft). The facade is of red sandstone.

=== Later designs ===
Frank O. Gehry (1994) and Sou Fujimoto (2013) each proposed extensions to the existing building; none of them were realized. The museum was refurbished in 2002.

In 2022, Bielefeld's City Council decided in favour of a comprehensive renovation of the Kunsthalle Bielefeld, with a budget of 40.5 million euros. By 2024, architecture firm Caruso St John was selected ahead of 44 other submissions.

== Naming dispute ==
When he endowed the building, Rudolf Oetker expressed a desire for it be called the Richard-Kaselowsky-Haus, after his stepfather. Richard Kaselowsky was a controversial figure in Bielefeld due to his Nazi past, including membership in not only the NSDAP but also the Freundeskreis der Wirtschaft. This led to a debate in Bielefeld, coinciding with the general social unrest of 1968 and becoming a major theme of it. The composer Hans Werner Henze cancelled the piano concert he had written for the inauguration, and the Minister-President of North Rhine-Westphalia, Heinz Kühn, excused himself from the ceremony along with two federal ministers. This led to the event, with 1,200 invitees, being completely cancelled – but the city council stuck to its choice of name. The "silent" opening on 27 September 1968 was accompanied by protests. A memorial to Kaselowsky, commemorating him as a victim of the heavy aerial bombing of September 1944, was only removed in 2017.

In the following years, the Kunsthalle ceased using the controversial part of its name in public. The discussion was revived in 1998 when the then-director, Thomas Kellein, sought to strengthen ties with the Oetkers and resurrected the Kaselowsky name. After the attempt to reach an uncontroversial solution failed, the city council changed the name to simply Kunsthalle Bielefeld, whereupon Rudolf Oetker ended his support and withdrew all the works that he had loaned to the collection.

== Directors ==
- 1954–1961: Gustav Vriesen
- 1961–1974: Joachim Wolfgang von Moltke
- 1974–1996: Ulrich Weisner
- 1996–2011: Thomas Kellein
- 2011–2019: Friedrich Meschede
- 2020–present: Christina Végh

== See also ==
- List of art museums
- List of museums in Germany
