= Obernkirchen =

- Town
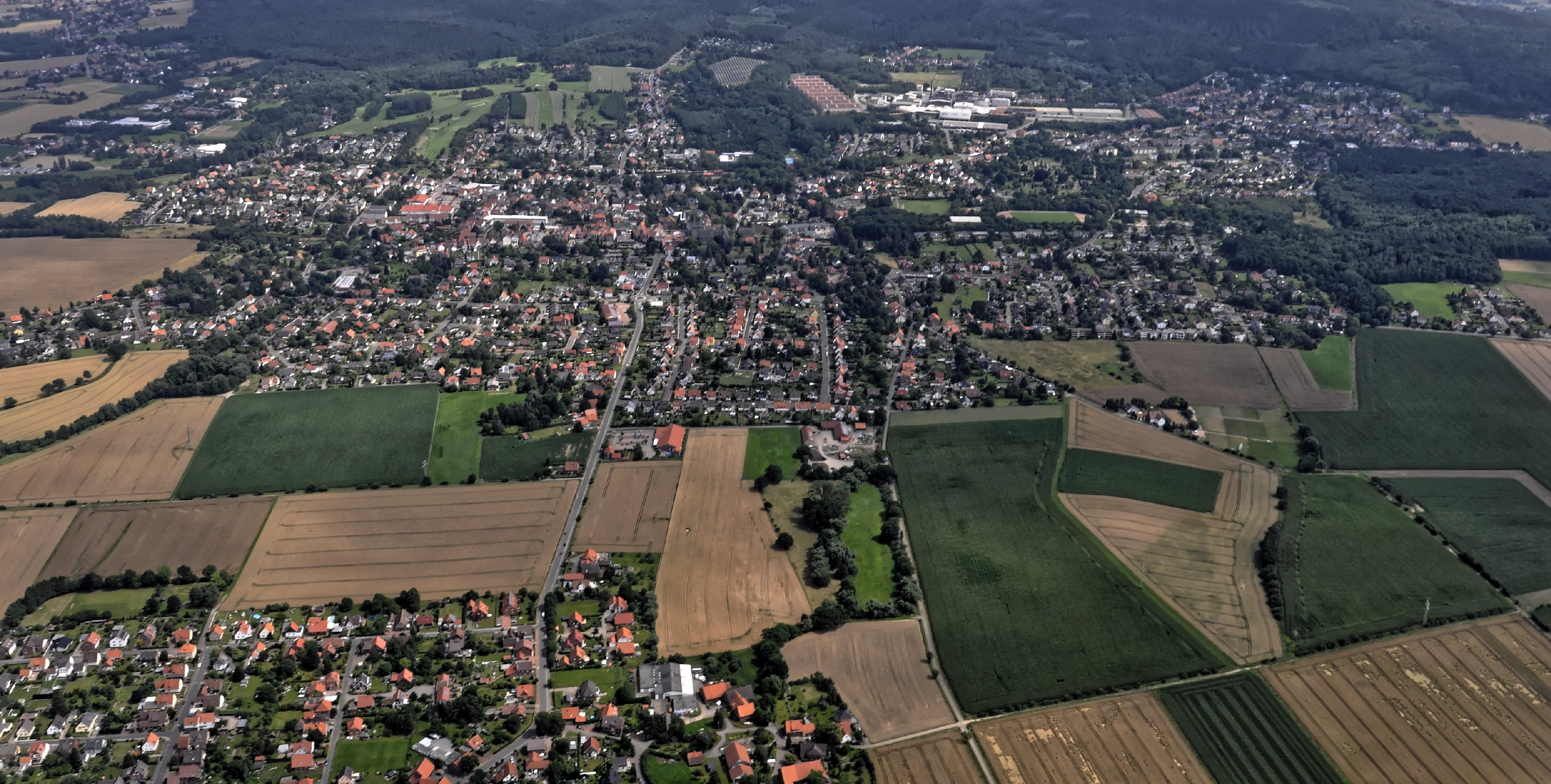
- Aerial view

- Coat of arms

- Location of Obernkirchen within Schaumburg district
- Interactive map of Obernkirchen
- Location within Germany Location within Lower Saxony
- Coordinates: 52°15′59″N 9°7′4″E
- Country: Germany
- State: Lower Saxony
- District: Schaumburg
- Subdivisions: 5

Government
  - Mayor (2021–26): Dörte Worm-Kressin (Ind.)

Area
  - Total: 32.45 km^{2} (12.53 sq mi)
- Elevation: 209 m (686 ft)

Population (2025-12-31)
  - Total: 8,907
  - Density: 274.5/km^{2} (710.9/sq mi)
- Time zone: UTC+01:00 (CET)
  - Summer (DST): UTC+02:00 (CEST)
- Postal codes: 31683
- Dialling codes: 0 57 24
- Vehicle registration: SHG
- Website: www.obernkirchen.de

Obernkirchen (German pronunciation: [oːbɐnˈkɪʁçn̩]) is a town in the district of Schaumburg, in Lower Saxony, Germany. It is situated approximately 8 km southwest of Stadthagen, and 15 km east of Minden.

Obernkirchen is a small town in the shadows of the Bückeberg, a hill range in the Weser Uplands. It overlooks the vast lower lying part of the old county of Schaumburg Lippe, now the district of Schaumburg, with the town of Bückeburg at its feet.

== People ==
- August Oetker (1862–1918), inventor, food scientist and businessman
