= August Oetker =

German inventor, food scientist and businessman (1862–1918)

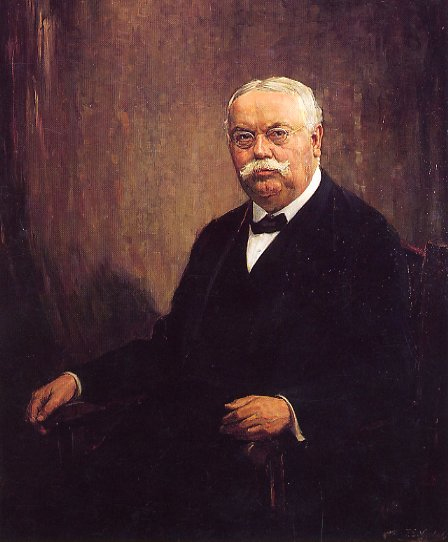
- Born: January 6, 1862; Obernkirchen, Schaumburg, Electorate of Hesse
- Died: January 10, 1918 (aged 56); Bielefeld, Westphalia, Germany
- Occupations: Food scientist; businessman
- Relatives: Rudolf August Oetker (grandson)
- Family: Oetker family

August Oetker (German: [ˈaʊɡʊst ˈʔœtkɐ]; January 6, 1862 – January 10, 1918) was a German inventor, food scientist and business person. He is known as the creator of baking powder as a ready-to-use product, and also as the founder of the Dr. Oetker company. He was the patriarch of the Oetker family.

== Biography ==
=== Early life ===
Oetker was born on January 6, 1862, in Obernkirchen, Electorate of Hesse, the oldest of eight children, to August Adolph Oetker (1834–1890) and Bertha Oetker (née Westphal; 1836–1902). He completed a doctoral thesis on the shape of pollen grains in 1888.

=== Career ===
In 1891, he bought the Aschoffsche pharmacy in Bielefeld and developed a baking agent, which was designed to ensure the success of the baking process. Prior to Oetker, a British chemist, Alfred Bird, had already invented baking powder, and American scientist Eben Norton Horsford had developed a ready-made 'double-acting' baking powder.

From 1890, he distributed his invention under the brand name Backin, thus laying the basis for the family-owned company, called Oetker-Gruppe. The company still uses the very same recipe to produce baking powder. On September 21, 1909, Oetker filed a patent for his Procedure for making long-lasting baking powder or ready-to-bake flour.

Due to successful marketing, his products sold quite well and soon the old pharmacy had turned into a successful company. In 1900, Oetker built his first manufacturing plant and, by 1906, had sold 50 million packages of Backin.

=== Death and legacy ===
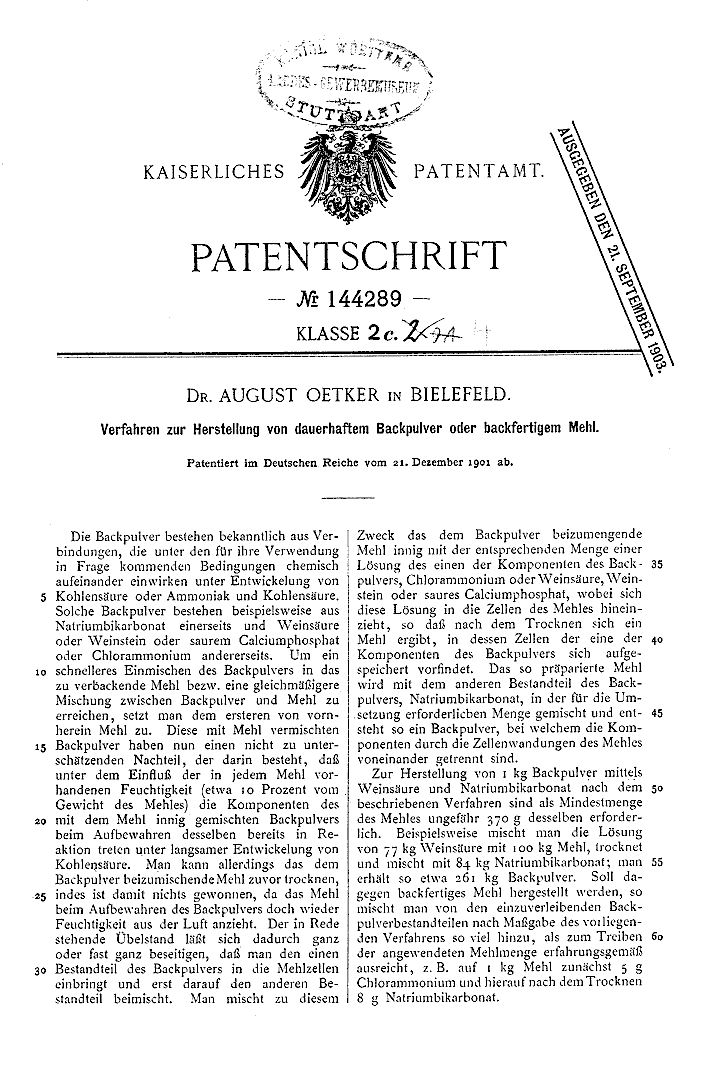
The 1903 patent

Oetker died on January 10, 1918, in Bielefeld, Germany. Later, his grandson, Rudolf August Oetker, took over the company.

Motto: Ein heller Kopf verwendet stets Oetker. ("A bright mind always uses Oetker").

== See also ==
- Oetker Collection
- Alfred Bird, inventor of Bird's custard and also the first baking powder in 1843
- Henry Jones, a Bristol baker who patented self-raising flour in 1845, as a means of providing fresh bread on ships.
