= Rudolf August Oetker =

German entrepreneur (1916–2007)

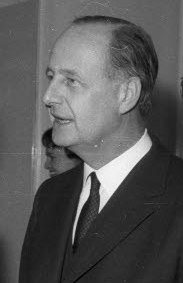
- Oetker in 1966
- Born: 20 September 1916; Bielefeld, German Empire
- Died: 16 January 2007 (aged 90); Hamburg, Germany
- Occupations: Owner and CEO of Oetker-Gruppe
- Political party: National Socialist German Workers' Party (1930s–1945)
- Children: 8
- Relatives: August Oetker (grandfather); Richard Kaselowsky (stepfather)
- Family: Oetker family

Rudolf August Oetker (20 September 1916 – 16 January 2007) colloquially also R. A. Oetker was a German industrialist, businessman, ship owner and philanthropist. Most notably he turned Dr. Oetker, founded by his grandfather August Oetker, into a multinational food conglomerate. During World War II, Oetker was a member of the Nazi Party.

== Early life and education ==
Oetker was born 20 September 1916 in Bielefeld, German Empire, the second child of Rudolf Oetker (1889–1916), a chemist, who fell in Verdun before his son was born, and Ida Oetker (née Meyer; 1891–1944). He had an older sister; Ursula Oetker (1915–2005).

Oetker served and volunteered in the Waffen-SS from 1941 to 1944. After his stepfather, Richard Kaselowsky, was killed in an air raid, Oetker became the president of his family-run business in 1944. The business was inherited from his grandfather, August Oetker, who invented a popular mixture of baking powder.

== Career ==
After the war, Oetker was interned in the Staumühle internment camp near Paderborn. When his SS blood group tattoo was discovered under his left armpit, he was brutally beaten by the guards. For years after the war, Oetker would need a cane to walk. Following his release in 1947, he would elevate the company to a household name in Germany today. The Oetker-Gruppe was one of the symbols of the post-World War II recovery effort in the country. In 1960s, Oetker funded Stille Hilfe, a relief organization for the SS veterans, fugitives, and convicted war criminals.

Oetker retired as executive director in 1981, turning the position over to his son August Oetker (jr.).

In 2006, his net worth was estimated by Forbes at US$8.0 billion.

== Personal life ==
In 1939, Oetker married his first wife Marlene Ahlmann (1915–2002), originally from Cologne which also hailed from an industrial family. Her family owned Carlshütte, an iron foundry, which employed up to 3,000 people. They had one daughter:

- Rosely Oetker (born 1940), who would later serve on the Landtag of Baden-Württemberg, married to Folkart Schweizer (born 1940); three children and five grandchildren.

In 1943, he married his second wife, divorcee Susanne Schuster (née Jantsch; 1922-2012), who would later marry Karl, Prinz zu Salm-Horstmar (1911–1991). They had four children;

- August Oetker (born 1944)
- Bergit Iris Ursula Oetker (born 1947), firstly married to Christoph von Luttitz, secondly to Christoph Archibald Douglas, currently Gräfin Douglas
- Christian Oetker (born 1948)
- Richard Oetker (born 1951)

On 8 February 1963, Oetker married Marianne (Maja) von Malaisé (born 1934), of nobility. With her he had three children;

- Alfred Oetker (born 1967)
- Carl Ferdinand Oetker (born 1972)
- Julia Oetker (born 1979)

In 2014, the Oetker business empire was valued at $12 billion, and each of his eight children inherited an equal share of 12.5%, or about $1.5 billion. After discovering Oetker's Nazi past, his children hired a provenance researcher to investigate the origins of his art collection. They have begun returning artworks found to be stolen or looted to the heirs of their Jewish owners. In 2019 a painting by Carl Spitzweg was restituted to the heirs of Leo Bendel who had been looted and murdered by Nazis. The painting had been acquired through the Galerie Heinemann in Munich.

== See also ==
- Dr. Oetker
- Oetker Collection
- P. & D. Colnaghi & Co. (Oetker's property in 1981)

== Sources ==
- Jungbluth, Rüdiger (2004). Die Oetkers (in German). Campus Verlag. ISBN 978-3-593-37396-6.
- Gotta, Frank (1981). Die deutsche Wirtschaftsprominenz 1981 von A-Z: Lexikon der 200 bedeutendsten zeitgenössischen Persönlichkeiten aus der Wirtschaft (in German). WEKA-Verlag. ISBN 978-3-8111-3046-3.
