= Richard Oetker =

German entrepreneur, victim of kidnapping

- Born: 4 January 1951 (age 75); Bielefeld, West Germany
- Occupations: Heir and businessman
- Title: CEO, Dr. Oetker
- Term: 2010–
- Parent(s): Rudolf August Oetker; Susanne Jantsch
- Family: Oetker family

Richard Oetker (born 4 January 1951) is a German billionaire heir and businessman, who in 2010 became CEO of multinational food processing company Dr. Oetker. In 1976 he was kidnapped by Dieter Zlof, a Slovene-born mechanic, and only released after a substantial ransom was paid. As of October 2021, his net worth was estimated at US$2.7 billion.

== Career ==
He was born in Bielefeld to Rudolf August Oetker (1916–2007) and Susanne Jantsch (1922–2012); his siblings are August Oetker the Younger, Bergit Countess Douglas, and Christian Oetker. He studied agronomy and brewing at the Technical University of Munich and has held various positions at Dr. Oetker since 1981, the year his father retired as CEO. He has been married twice and has two children.

== Kidnapping ==
On 14 December 1976, the 25-year-old student was kidnapped by 34-year-old Dieter Zlof, a Slovene-born mechanic who locked him into a crate and linked his feet and wrists to manacles that would give him electric shocks if he screamed or tried to break out. While Oetker was 1.94 metres (6 ft 4 in) tall, the crate was 1.45 metres (4 ft 9 in) long and 70 cm (28 in) wide. In the early hours of 15 December, a noise sparked off a near fatal shock that broke Oetker's thighs and two of his ribs as he thumped against the crate. His screams prolonged the shocks by ten seconds, and the pain was such that he briefly wanted to die.

He was freed for DM21 million, the highest ransom then paid in Germany. The abduction had lasted 47 hours by the time he was found in an Opel Commodore on 16 December. Zlof was arrested on 30 January 1979 on circumstantial evidence. Though he did not plead guilty, he received the maximum penalty – fifteen years in prison – on 9 June 1980.

In May 1997, Zlof, who had buried the ransom in a forest around 30 km (19 mi) southeast of Munich, went to England to swap mouldy banknotes worth DM12.5 million for usable money. The rest had mouldered away in its cache. He was re-arrested, served out a two-year sentence, and confessed to the kidnapping in a 1997 autobiography which was written by his barrister’s wife.

Oetker still suffers from the injuries he sustained in the crate. He spent four years on crutches, had several operations until 1994, and relearned to stand and walk. His lung had also been damaged as a result of his squatting inside the crate for hours on end.

== Dance with the Devil ==
The 2001 film Dance with the Devil (German: Der Tanz mit dem Teufel) revolves around Oetker's ransom. It stars Sebastian Koch as Richard Oetker, Tobias Moretti as investigator Helmut Bauer (who the script renames Georg Kufbach), and Christoph Waltz as Dieter Cilov. Zlof's name was altered for legal reasons.

== See also ==
- List of kidnappings
