= Hero Group =

Food manufacturer in Switzerland

The Hero Group
- Company type: Private
- Industry: Food industry manufacture of prepared meals and dishes other processing and preserving of fruit and vegetables
- Founded: 1886; 140 years ago
- Founder: Gustav Henckell; Gustav Zeiler
- Headquarters: Lenzburg (Aargau), Switzerland
- Area served: Worldwide
- Key people: Dr. Arend Oetker (honorary chairman); Dr. Hasso Kaempfe (chairman of the Board of Directors); Rob Versloot (CEO)
- Products: Baby & Toddler Food, Baby & Toddler Milk, Jams, Healthy Snacks
- Revenue: ▲CHF 1.14 billion (2021)
- Number of employees: 4,300 (2015)
- Website: www.hero-group.ch

Hero Group is a privately held consumer food manufacturer and marketing company based in Switzerland. Focusing baby and toddler food, healthy snacks, and natural spreads, the group brands include Corny Snack Bars and Semper Baby food.

== Overview ==
In 1995, Dr. Arend Oetker acquired a majority shareholding in Hero and re-positioned the Group to focus on branded business. Business segments that no longer fitted this brand strategy were divested. In parallel, the Group embarked on a major geographic expansion program.

Today, Hero is producing products in its core product categories. The Group's operations are based predominantly in Europe, North America, Middle East/Africa and Turkey/Central Asia.

== History ==
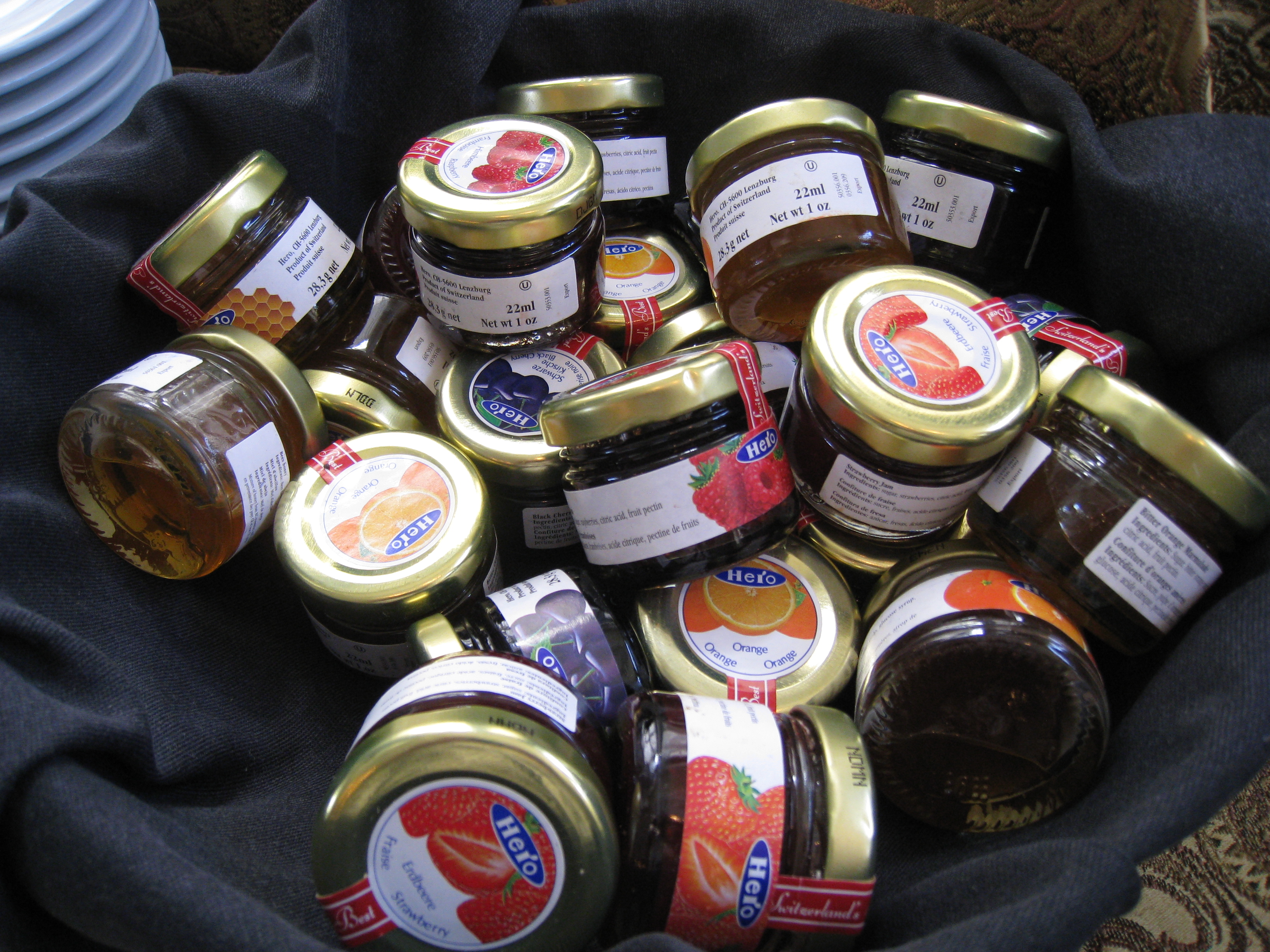
Small jars of Hero jam and marmalade at a brunch buffet

The Hero Group was founded in 1886 in Lenzburg, Switzerland by Gustav Henckell and Gustav Zeiler, two German immigrants.

In 1888, investor Carl Roth joined the business. After Zeiler’s death in 1890, the first two letters of Henckell and Roth's names were combined to name the company ‘Hero Conserven Lenzbourg’.

In 1995, Arend Oetker took a majority holding in Hero with full ownership of the company being transferred to the Oetker family in 2003.

In 2024, Hero bought the 'Deliciously Ella' brand, founded by Ella Mills.
