= Etchū-Funahashi Station =

Railway station in Funahashi, Toyama Prefecture, Japan

Etchū-Funahashi Station 越中舟橋駅
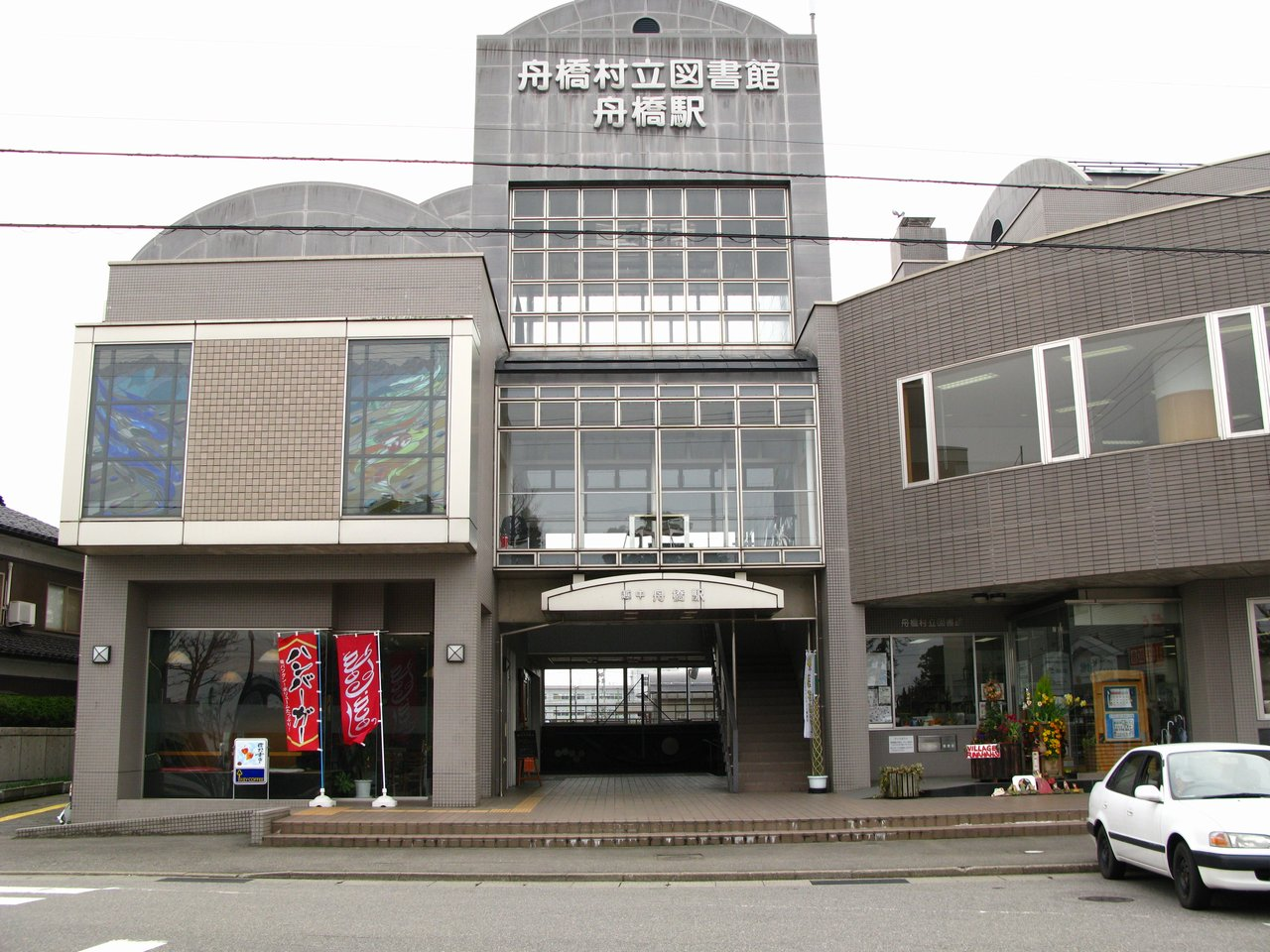
- Etchū-Funahashi Station in March 2008

General information
- Location: 602 Takeuchi, Funahashi-mura, Nakaniikawa-gun, Toyama-ken 930-0289; Japan
- Coordinates: 36.7065°N 137.3060°E
- Operator: Toyama Chihō Railway
- Line: ■ Toyama Chihō Railway Main Line
- Distance: 8.5 km from Dentetsu-Toyama
- Platforms: 2 side platforms
- Tracks: 2

Other information
- Status: Staffed
- Website: Official website

History
- Opened: 15 August 1931
Location
- Location within Japan

Etchū-Funahashi Station (越中舟橋駅, Etchū-Funahashi-eki) is a train station in the village of Funahashi, Nakaniikawa District, Toyama Prefecture, Japan.

== Lines ==
Etchū-Funahashi Station is served by the Toyama Chihō Railway Main Line, and is 8.5 kilometers from the starting point of the line at Dentetsu-Toyama.

== Station layout ==
The station has two ground-level opposed side platforms serving two tracks. The station is staffed on weekdays.

=== Platforms ===
1	■ Toyama Chihō Railway Main Line	for Dentetsu Toyama
2	■ Toyama Chihō Railway Main Line	for Kamiichi, Dentetsu-Uozu and Unazuki-Onsen

== History ==
Etchū-Funahashi Station was opened on 15 August 1931.

== Adjacent stations ==
«	Service	»
Toyama Chihō Railway Main Line
Limited Express: Does not stop at this station
Rapid Express: Does not stop at this station
Etchū-Sangō	Express	Terada
Etchū-Sangō	Local	Terada

== Surrounding area ==
- Funahashi Village Hall
- Funahashi Elementary School
- Funahashi Junior High School

== See also ==
- List of railway stations in Japan
