= Etchū-Ebara Station =

Railway station in Toyama, Toyama Prefecture, Japan

Etchū-Ebara Station 越中荏原駅
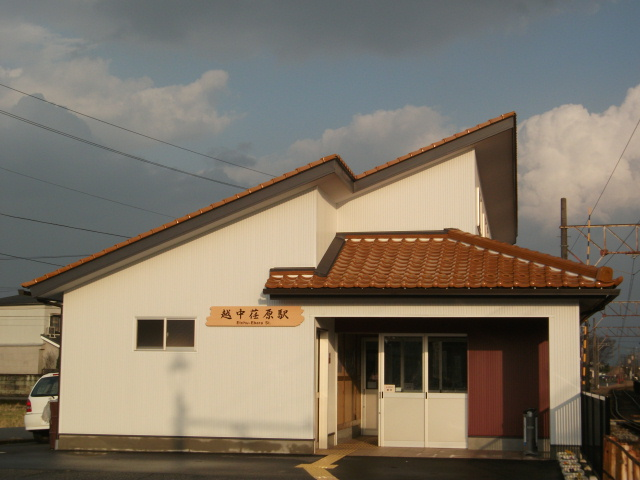
- Etchū-Ebara Station in 2010

General information
- Location: 2-13-7 Shinjo, Toyama-shi, Toyama-ken 930-0916; Japan
- Coordinates: 36.6991°N 137.2664°E
- Operator: Toyama Chihō Railway
- Line: ■ Toyama Chihō Railway Main Line
- Distance: 4.7 km from Dentetsu-Toyama
- Platforms: 1 island platform
- Tracks: 2

Other information
- Status: Staffed
- Website: Official website

History
- Opened: 15 August 1931
- Rebuilt: 2010
- Former names: Shimamura Station (to 1945)

Passengers
- FY2015: 929
Location
- Location within Japan

Etchū-Ebara Station (越中荏原駅, Etchū-Ebara-eki) is a train station in the city of Toyama, Toyama Prefecture, Japan.

== Lines ==
Etchū-Ebara Station is served by the Toyama Chihō Railway Main Line, and is 4.7 kilometers from the starting point of the line at Dentetsu-Toyama.

== Station layout ==
The station has one ground-level island platform serving two tracks. The station is staffed.

=== Platforms ===
1	■ Toyama Chihō Railway Main Line	for Dentetsu Toyama
2	■ Toyama Chihō Railway Main Line	for Kamiichi, Dentetsu-Uozu and Unazuki-Onsen

== History ==
Etchū-Ebara Station was opened on 7 November 1931 as Shimamura Station (島村駅, Shimamura-eki). It was renamed to its present name on 21 September 1945. A new station building was completed in March 2010.

== Adjacent stations ==
«	Service	»
Toyama Chihō Railway Main Line
Limited Express: Does not stop at this station
Rapid Express: Does not stop at this station
Higashi-Shinjō	Express	Etchū-Sangō
Higashi-Shinjō	Local	Etchū-Sangō

== Surrounding area ==
- Dai-Ichi High School

== See also ==
- List of railway stations in Japan
