= Higashi-Shinjō Station (Toyama) =

Railway station in Toyama, Toyama Prefecture, Japan

Higashi-Shinjō Station 東新庄駅
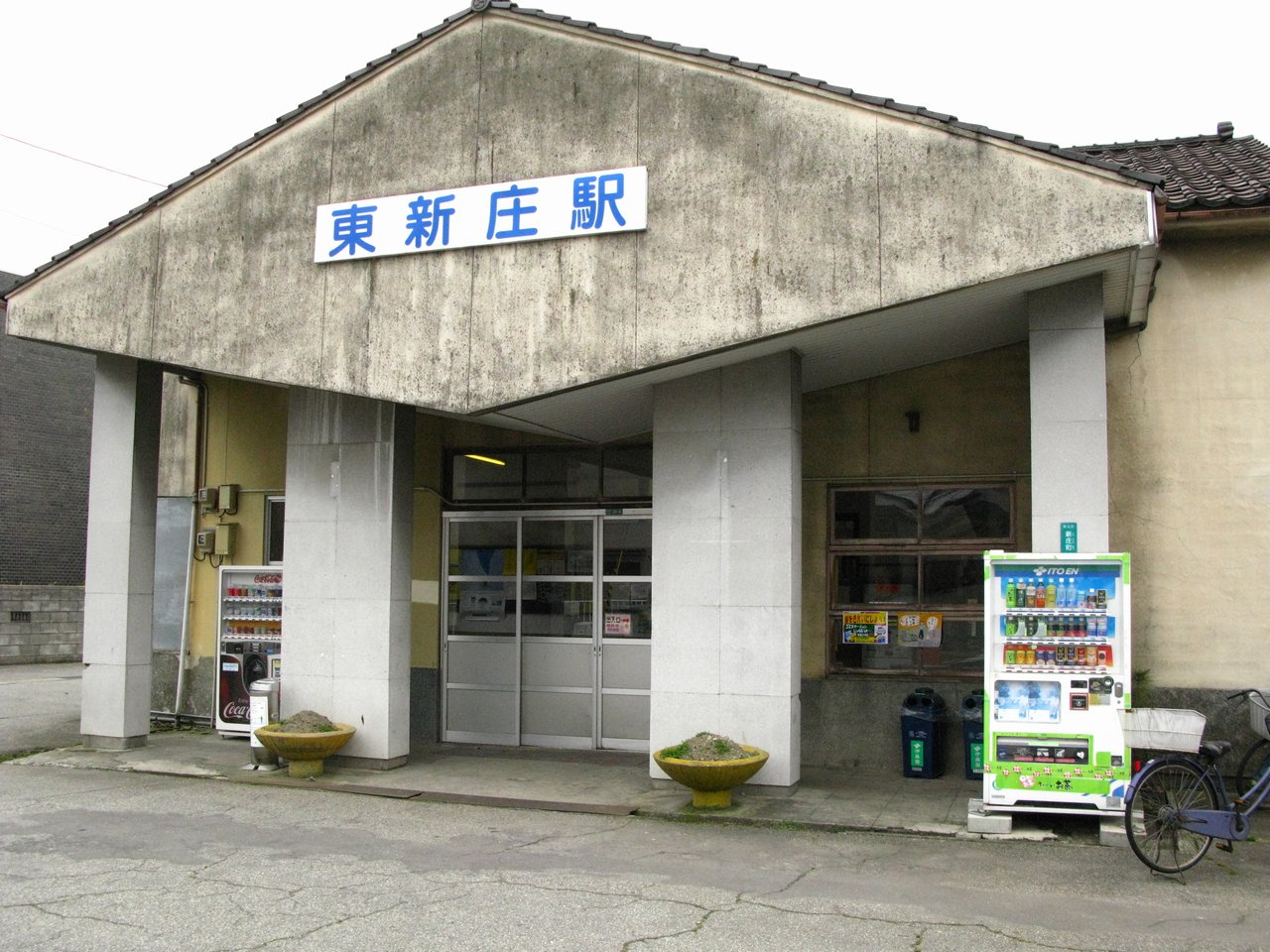
- Higashi-Shinjō Station in March 2008

General information
- Location: 1-25-6 Shinjo, Toyama-shi, Toyama-ken 930-0992; Japan
- Coordinates: 36.6987°N 137.2532°E
- Operator: Toyama Chihō Railway
- Line: ■ Toyama Chihō Railway Main Line
- Distance: 3.6 km from Dentetsu-Toyama
- Platforms: 2 side platforms
- Tracks: 2

Other information
- Status: Staffed
- Website: Official website

History
- Opened: 15 August 1931

Passengers
- FY2015: 918
Location
- Location within Japan

Higashi-Shinjō Station (東新庄駅, Higashi-Shinjō-eki) is a train station in the city of Toyama, Toyama Prefecture, Japan.

== Lines ==
Higashi-Shinjō Station is served by the Toyama Chihō Railway Main Line, and is 3.6 kilometers from the starting point of the line at Dentetsu-Toyama.

== Station layout ==
The station has two ground-level opposed side platforms serving two tracks. The station is staffed during weekdays.

=== Platforms ===
1	■ Toyama Chihō Railway Main Line	for Dentetsu Toyama
2	■ Toyama Chihō Railway Main Line	for Kamiichi, Dentetsu-Uozu and Unazuki-Onsen

== History ==
Higashi-Shinjō Station was opened on 15 August 1931.

== Passenger statistics ==
In fiscal 2015, the station was used by 918 passengers daily.

== Adjacent stations ==
«	Service	»
Toyama Chihō Railway Main Line
Limited Express: Does not stop at this station
Rapid Express: Does not stop at this station
Shinjō-Tanaka	Express	Etchū-Ebara
Shinjō-Tanaka	Local	Etchū-Ebara

== Surrounding area ==
- Shinjō Elementary School
- Japan National Route 41

== See also ==
- List of railway stations in Japan
