= Naka-Kazumi Station =

Railway station in Namerikawa, Toyama Prefecture, Japan

Naka-Kazumi Station 中加積駅
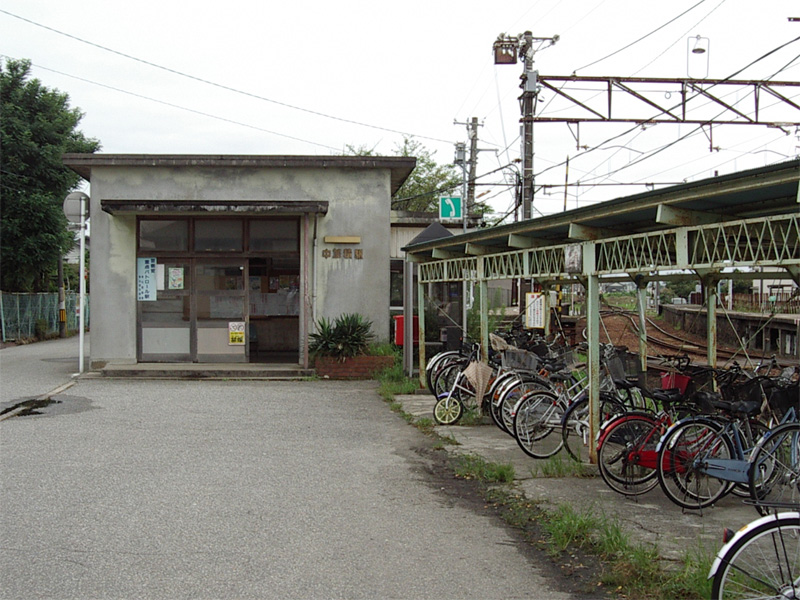
- Naka-Kazumi Station in August 2008

General information
- Location: 938 Horie, Namerikawa-shi, Toyama-ken 936-0846; Japan
- Coordinates: 36.7355°N 137.3508°E
- Operator: Toyama Chihō Railway
- Line: ■ Toyama Chihō Railway Main Line
- Distance: 17.1 from Dentetsu-Toyama
- Platforms: 1 island platform
- Tracks: 2

Other information
- Status: Staffed
- Website: Official website

History
- Opened: 25 June 1913
- Former names: Horie Station (to 1921)

Passengers
- FY2015: 235
Location
- Location within Japan

Naka-Kazumi Station (中加積駅, Naka-Kazumi-eki) is a railway station in the city of Namerikawa, Toyama, Japan, operated by the private railway operator Toyama Chihō Railway.

== Lines ==
Naka-Kazumi Station is served by the Toyama Chihō Railway Main Line, and is 17.1 kilometers from the starting point of the line at Dentetsu-Toyama.

== Station layout ==
The station has one ground-level island platform serving two tracks, connected to the wooden station building by a level crossing. The station is staffed.

=== Platforms ===
| 1 | ■ Toyama Chihō Railway Main Line | for Dentetsu Toyama |
| 2 | ■ Toyama Chihō Railway Main Line | for Dentetsu-Uozu and Unazuki-Onsen |

== History ==
Naka-Kazumi Station was opened on 25 June 1913 as Horie Station (堀江駅). It was renamed to its present name on 20 February 1921.

== Adjacent stations ==
| « | Service | » |
Toyama Chihō Railway Main Line
Limited Express: Does not stop at this station
| Shin-Miyakawa | Rapid Express | Naka-Namerikawa |
| Shin-Miyakawa | Express | Naka-Namerikawa |
| Shin-Miyakawa | Local | Nishi-Kazumi |

== Passenger statistics ==
In fiscal 2015, the station was used by 235 passengers daily.

== Surrounding area ==
- Namerikawa Athletic Park
- Nambu Elementary School

== See also ==
- List of railway stations in Japan
