= Etchū-Sangō Station =

Railway station in Toyama, Toyama Prefecture, Japan

Etchū-Sangō Station 越中三郷駅
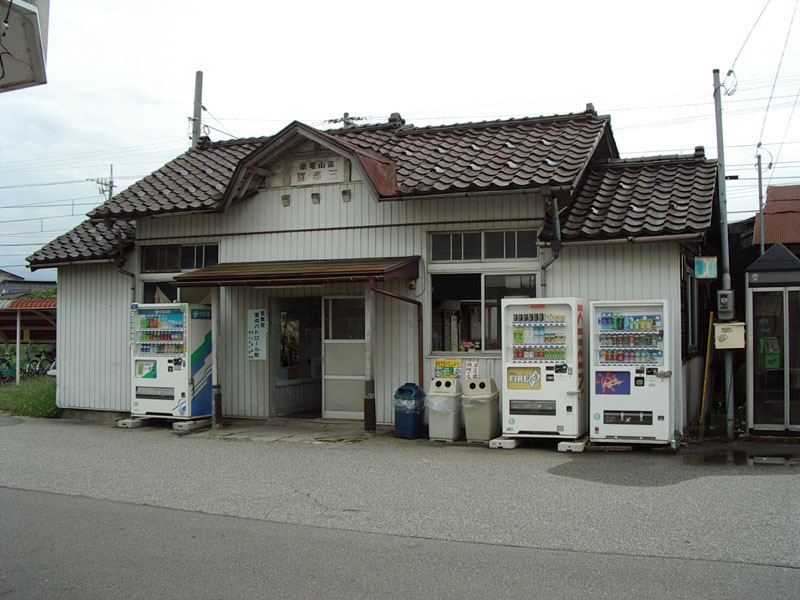
- Etchū-Sangō Station in August 2008

General information
- Location: 460-1 Mizuhashi-Kaihatsu, Toyama-shi, Toyama-ken 939-3542; Japan
- Coordinates: 36°42′12.11″N 137°17′26.8″E
- Operator: Toyama Chihō Railway
- Line: ■ Toyama Chihō Railway Main Line
- Distance: 7.0 km from Dentetsu-Toyama
- Platforms: 2 side platforms
- Tracks: 2

Other information
- Status: Unstaffed
- Website: Official website

History
- Opened: 15 August 1931

Passengers
- FY2015: 514
Location
- Location within Japan

Etchū-Sangō Station (越中三郷駅, Etchū-Sangō-eki) is a train station in the city of Toyama, Toyama Prefecture, Japan.

== Lines ==
Etchū-Sangō Station is served by the Toyama Chihō Railway Main Line, and is 7.0 kilometers from the starting point of the line at Dentetsu-Toyama.

== Station layout ==
The station has two ground-level opposed side platforms serving two tracks. The station is unattended.

=== Platforms ===
1	■ Toyama Chihō Railway Main Line	for Dentetsu Toyama
2	■ Toyama Chihō Railway Main Line	for Kamiichi, Dentetsu-Uozu and Unazuki-Onsen

== History ==
Etchū-Sangō Station was opened on 15 August 1931.

== Passenger statistics ==
In fiscal 2015, the station was used by 514 passengers daily.

== Adjacent stations ==
«	Service	»
Toyama Chihō Railway Main Line
Limited Express: Does not stop at this station
Rapid Express: Does not stop at this station
Etchū-Ebara	Express	Etchū-Funahashi
Etchū-Ebara	Local	Etchū-Funahashi

== Surrounding area ==
- Sangō Post Office

== See also ==
- List of railway stations in Japan
