= Ainoki Station =

Railway station in Kamiichi, Toyama Prefecture, Japan

Ainoki Station 相ノ木駅
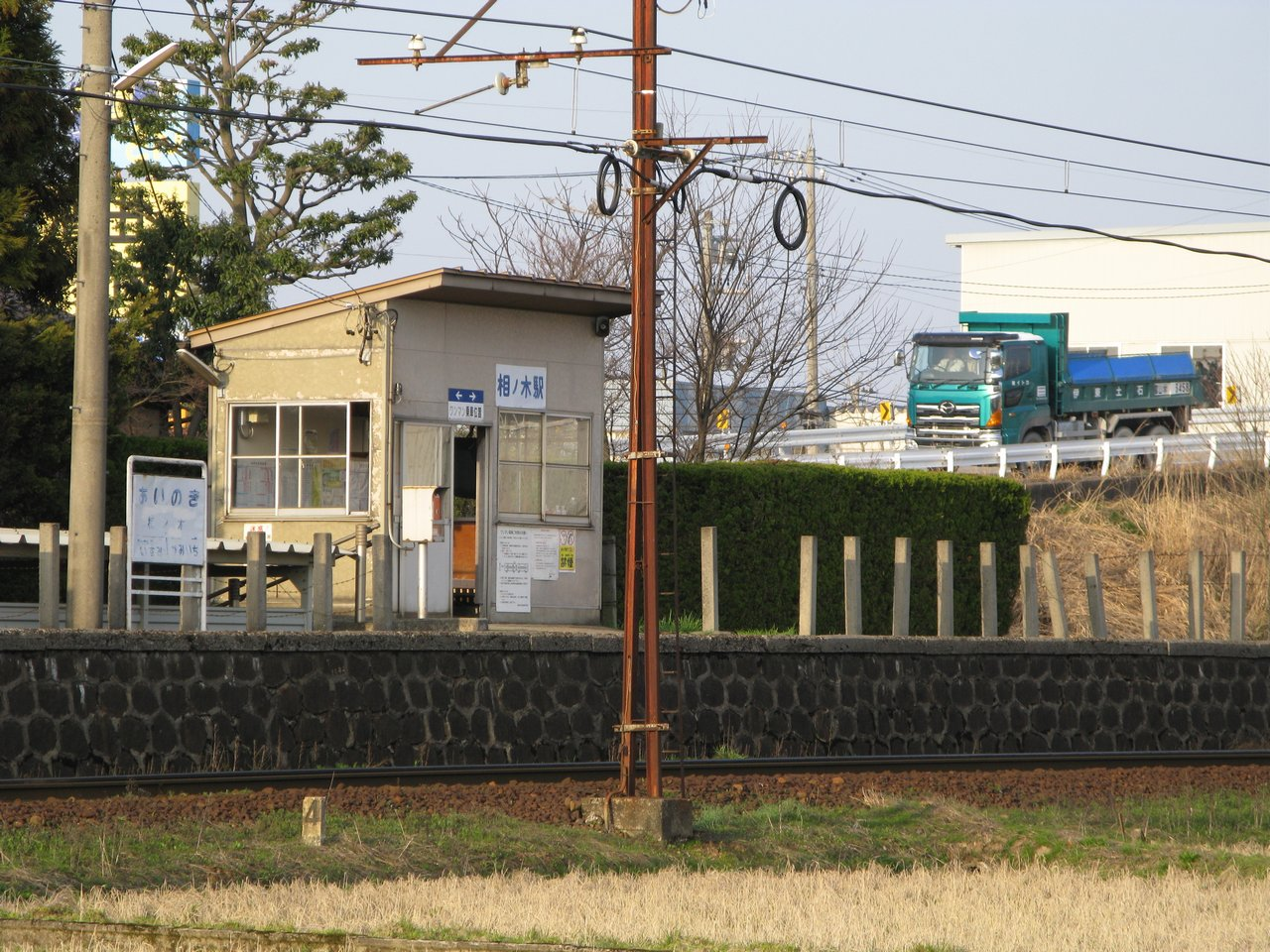
- Ainoki Station in March 2008

General information
- Location: 47 Shoinshin Kamiichi-machi, Nakaniikawa-gun, Toyama-ken 930-0358; Japan
- Coordinates: 36°42′7.03″N 137°20′7.46″E
- Operator: Toyama Chihō Railway
- Line: ■ Toyama Chihō Railway Main Line
- Distance: 11.3 km from Dentetsu-Toyama
- Platforms: 1 side platform
- Tracks: 1

Other information
- Status: Unstaffed
- Website: Official website

History
- Opened: 1 September 1931
- Closed: 1944-1949
- Rebuilt: 1949
- Former names: Kyōden Station (to 1936)
Location
- Location within Japan

Ainoki Station (相ノ木駅, Ainoki-eki) is a train station in the town of Kamiichi, Nakaniikawa District, Toyama Prefecture, Japan.

== Lines ==
Ainoki Station is served by the Toyama Chihō Railway Main Line, and is 11.3 kilometers from the starting point of the line at Dentetsu-Toyama.

== Station layout ==
The station has one ground-level side platform serving a single bi-directional track. The station is unattended.

== History ==
Ainoki Station was opened on 1 September 1931 as Kyōden Station (経田駅) at a location approximately 700 meters in the direction of Kamiichi Station. It was renamed to its present name on 1 October 1936, and was closed on 18 May 1944. It was relocated to its present location and reopened as Ainoki Station on 15 April 1949.

== Adjacent stations ==
«	Service	»
Toyama Chihō Railway Main Line
Limited Express: Does not stop at this station
Rapid Express: Does not stop at this station
Express: Does not stop at this station
Etchū-Izumi	Local	Shin-Ainoki

== Surrounding area ==
- Hokuriku Expressway

== See also ==
- List of railway stations in Japan
