= Shin-Miyakawa Station =

Railway station in Kamiichi, Toyama Prefecture, Japan

Shin-Miyakawa Station 新宮川駅
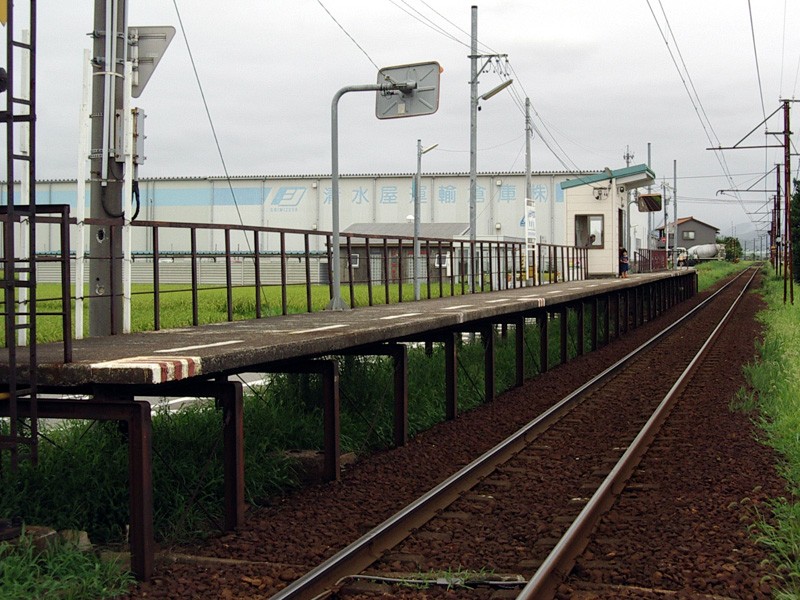
- Shin-Miyakawa Station in August 2008

General information
- Location: 32 Naka-Egami, Kamiichi-machi, Nakaniikawa-gun, Toyama-ken 930-0313; Japan
- Coordinates: 36.7173°N 137.3513°E
- Operator: Toyama Chihō Railway
- Line: ■ Toyama Chihō Railway Main Line
- Distance: 15.1 from Dentetsu-Toyama
- Platforms: 1 side platform
- Tracks: 1

Other information
- Status: Unstaffed
- Website: Official website

History
- Opened: 25 June 1913
- Former names: Egami Station (to 1921)
Location
- Location within Japan

Shin-Miyakawa Station (新宮川駅, Shin-Miyakawa-eki) is a railway station in the town of Kamiichi, Nakaniikawa District, Toyama Prefecture, Japan, operated by the private railway operator Toyama Chihō Railway.

== Lines ==
Shin-Miyakawa Station is served by the Toyama Chihō Railway Main Line, and is 15.1 kilometers from the starting point of the line at Dentetsu-Toyama.

== Station layout ==
The station has one ground-level side platform serving a single bi-directional track. The station is unattended.

== History ==
Shin-Miyakawa Station was opened on 25 June 1913 as Egami Station (江上駅). It was rebated to its present name on 20 February 1921.

== Adjacent stations ==
«	Service	»
Toyama Chihō Railway Main Line
Limited Express: Does not stop at this station
Kamiichi	Rapid Express	Naka-Kazumi
Kamiichi	Express	Naka-Kazumi
Kamiichi	Local	Naka-Kazumi

== Surrounding area ==
- Miyakawa Elementary School

== See also ==
- List of railway stations in Japan
