= Etchū-Izumi Station =

Railway station in Tateyama, Toyama Prefecture, Japan

Etchū-Izumi Station 越中泉駅
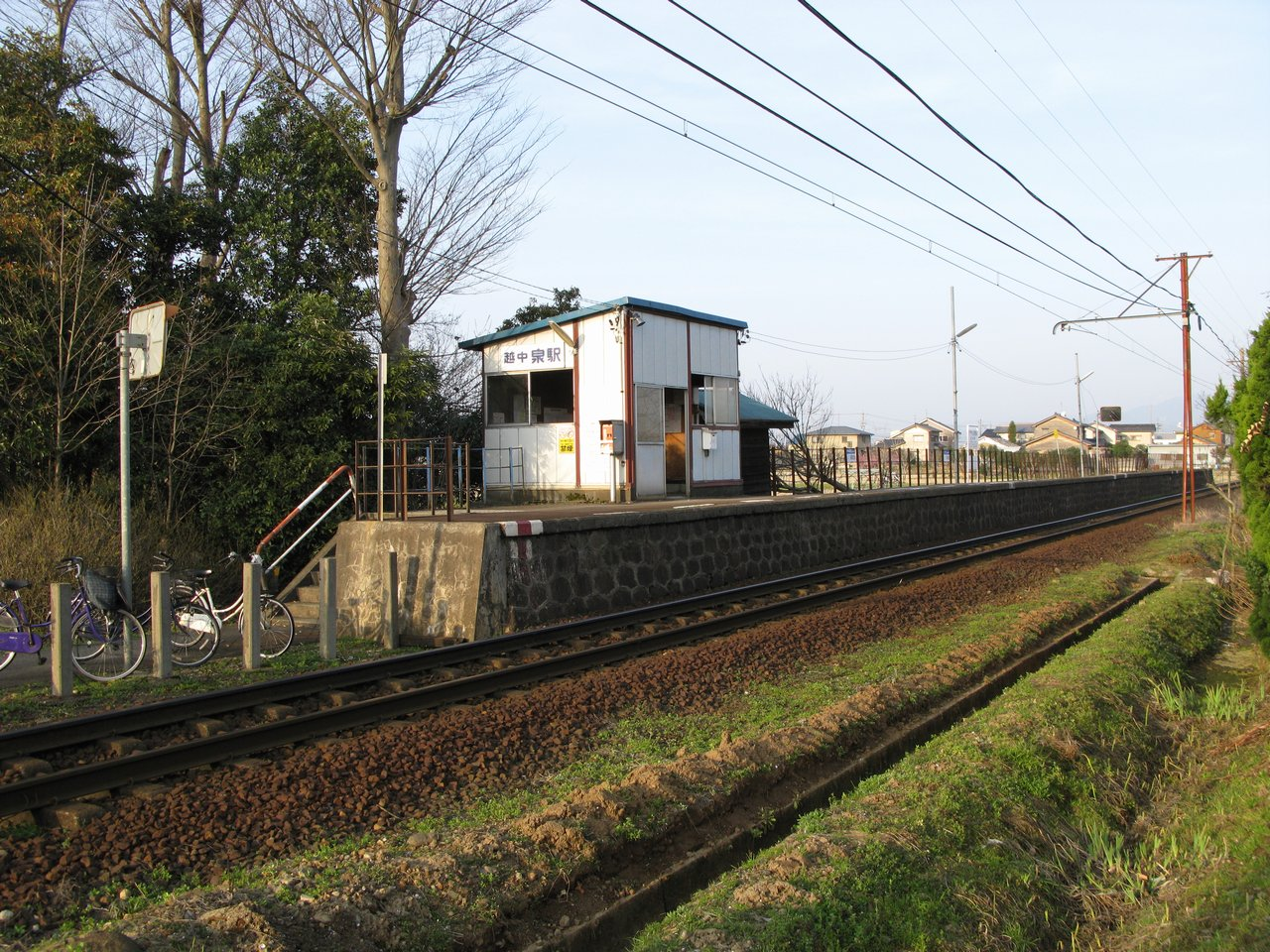
- Etchū-Izumi Station in March 2008

General information
- Location: Izumi, Tateyama-machi, Nakaniikawa-gun, Toyama-ken 930-0201; Japan
- Coordinates: 36°41′59.66″N 137°19′38.08″E
- Operator: Toyama Chihō Railway
- Line: ■ Toyama Chihō Railway Main Line
- Distance: 10.5 from Dentetsu-Toyama
- Platforms: 1 side platform
- Tracks: 1

Other information
- Status: Unstaffed
- Website: Official website

History
- Opened: 15 August 1931
- Former names: Izumi Station (to 1937)

Passengers
- FY2015: 67
Location
- Location within Japan

Etchū-Izumi Station (越中泉駅, Etchū-Izumi-eki) is a train station in the town of Tateyama, Nakaniikawa District, Toyama Prefecture, Japan.

== Lines ==
Etchū-Izumi Station is served by the Toyama Chihō Railway Main Line, and is 10.5 kilometers from the starting point of the line at Dentetsu-Toyama.

== Station layout ==
The station has one ground-level side platform serving a single bi-directional track. The station is unattended.

== History ==
Etchū-Izumi Station was opened on 15 August 1931 as Izumi Station (泉駅). It was renamed to its present name in 1937.

== Adjacent stations ==
«	Service	»
Toyama Chihō Railway Main Line
Limited Express: Does not stop at this station
Rapid Express: Does not stop at this station
Express: Does not stop at this station
Terada	Local	Ainoki

== Surrounding area ==
The station is located in a rural area surrounded by fields.

== See also ==
- List of railway stations in Japan
