= Aimoto Station (Toyama) =

Railway station in Kurobe, Toyama Prefecture, Japan

Aimoto Station 愛本駅
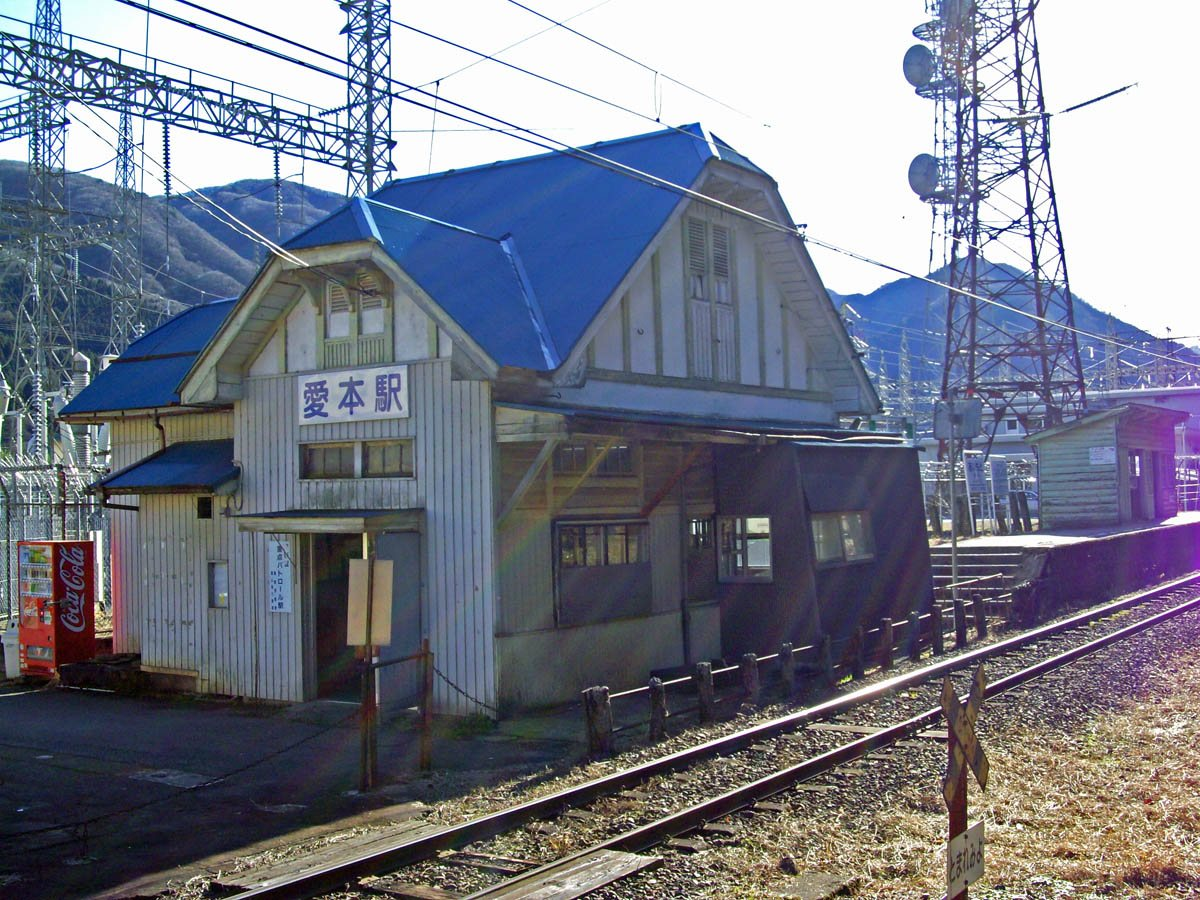
- Aimoto Station in December 2008

General information
- Location: 2826 Uchiyama, Unatsuki-machi, Kurobe-shi, Toyama-ken 938-0281; Japan
- Coordinates: 36.8562°N 137.5539°E
- Operator: Toyama Chihō Railway
- Line: ■ Toyama Chihō Railway Main Line
- Distance: 47.6 from Dentetsu-Toyama
- Platforms: 1 side platform
- Tracks: 1

Other information
- Status: Unstaffed
- Website: Official website

History
- Opened: 21 November 1923

Passengers
- FY2015: 242 daily
Location
- Location within Japan

Aimoto Station (愛本駅, Aimoto-eki) is a railway station in the city of Kurobe, Toyama, Japan, operated by the private railway operator Toyama Chihō Railway.

== Lines ==
Aimoto Station is served by the Toyama Chihō Railway Main Line, and is 47.6 kilometers from the starting point of the line at Dentetsu-Toyama.

== Station layout ==
The station has one ground-level side platform serving a single bi-directional track. The station is unattended.

== History ==
Aimoto Station was opened on 21 November 1923.

== Adjacent stations ==
«	Service	»
Toyama Chihō Railway Main Line
Urayama	Limited Express	Unazukionsen
Oritate	Rapid Express	Uchiyama
Oritate	Express	Uchiyama
Oritate	Local	Uchiyama

== Passenger statistics ==
In fiscal 2015, the station was used by 242 passengers daily.

== Surrounding area ==
- former Unatsuki Town Hall

== See also ==
- List of railway stations in Japan
