= Oritate Station =

Railway station in Kurobe, Toyama Prefecture, Japan

Oritate Station 下立駅
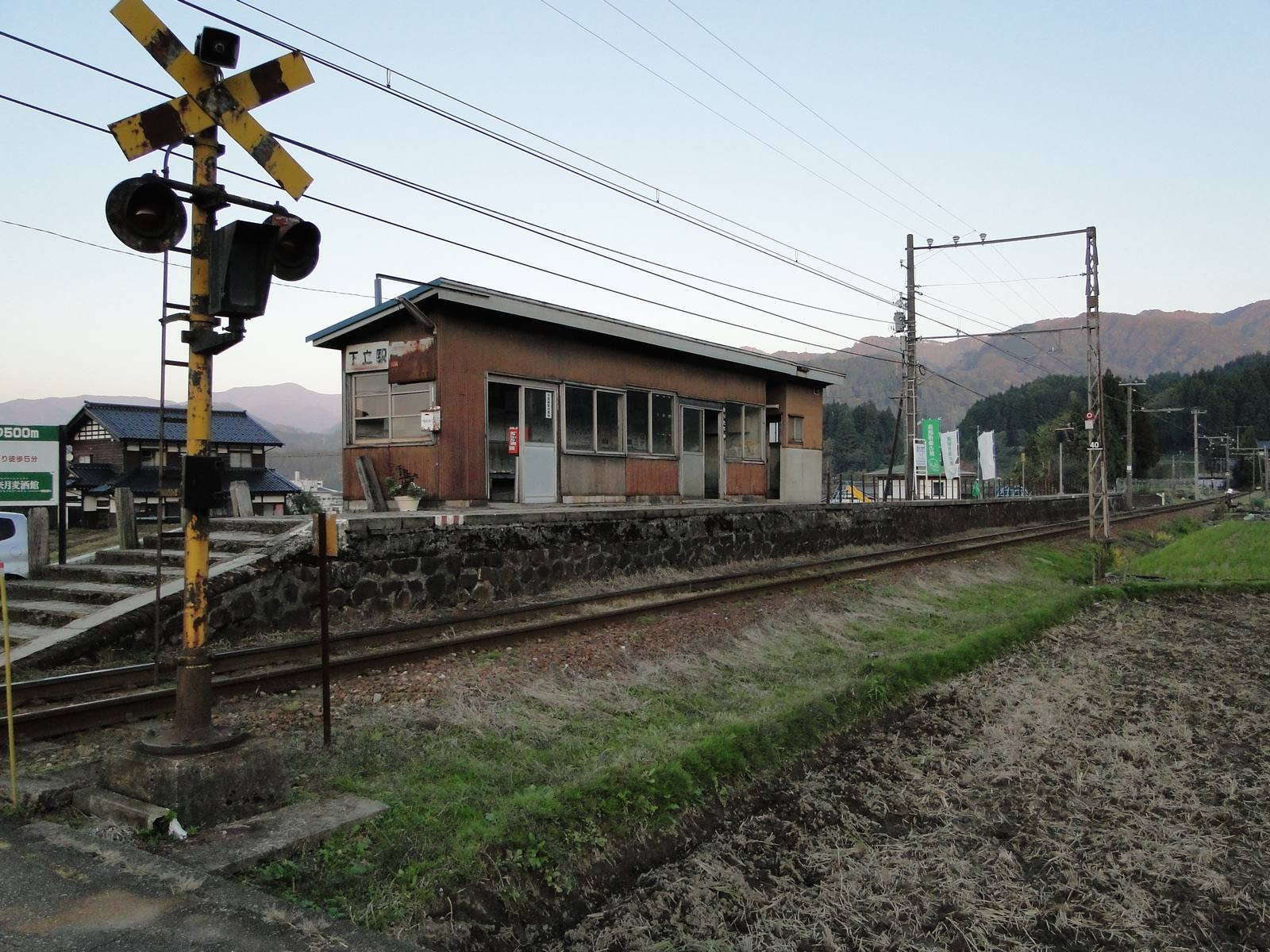
- Oritate Station in November 2010

General information
- Location: 3195-2 Oritate, Unatsuki-machi, Kurobe-shi, Toyama-ken 938-0861; Japan
- Coordinates: 36.8579°N 137.5416°E
- Operator: Toyama Chihō Railway
- Line: ■ Toyama Chihō Railway Main Line
- Distance: 46.3 from Dentetsu-Toyama
- Platforms: 1 side platform
- Tracks: 1

Other information
- Status: Unstaffed
- Website: Official website

History
- Opened: 5 November 1922

Passengers
- FY2015: 93 daily
Location
- Location within Japan

Oritate Station (下立駅, Oritate-eki) is a railway station in the city of Kurobe, Toyama, Japan, operated by the private railway operator Toyama Chihō Railway.

== Lines ==
Oritate Station is served by the Toyama Chihō Railway Main Line, and is 46.3 kilometers from the starting point of the line at Dentetsu-Toyama.

== Station layout ==
The station has one ground-level side platform serving a single bi-directional track. The station is unattended.

== History ==
Oritate Station was opened on 5 November 1922.

== Adjacent stations ==
«	Service	»
Toyama Chihō Railway Main Line
Limited Express: Does not stop at this station
Oritateguchi	Rapid Express	Aimoto
Oritateguchi	Express	Aimoto
Oritateguchi	Local	Aimoto

== Surrounding area ==
- Unatsuki Junior High School

== See also ==
- List of railway stations in Japan
