= Funahashi =

Funahashi 舟橋村
- Village
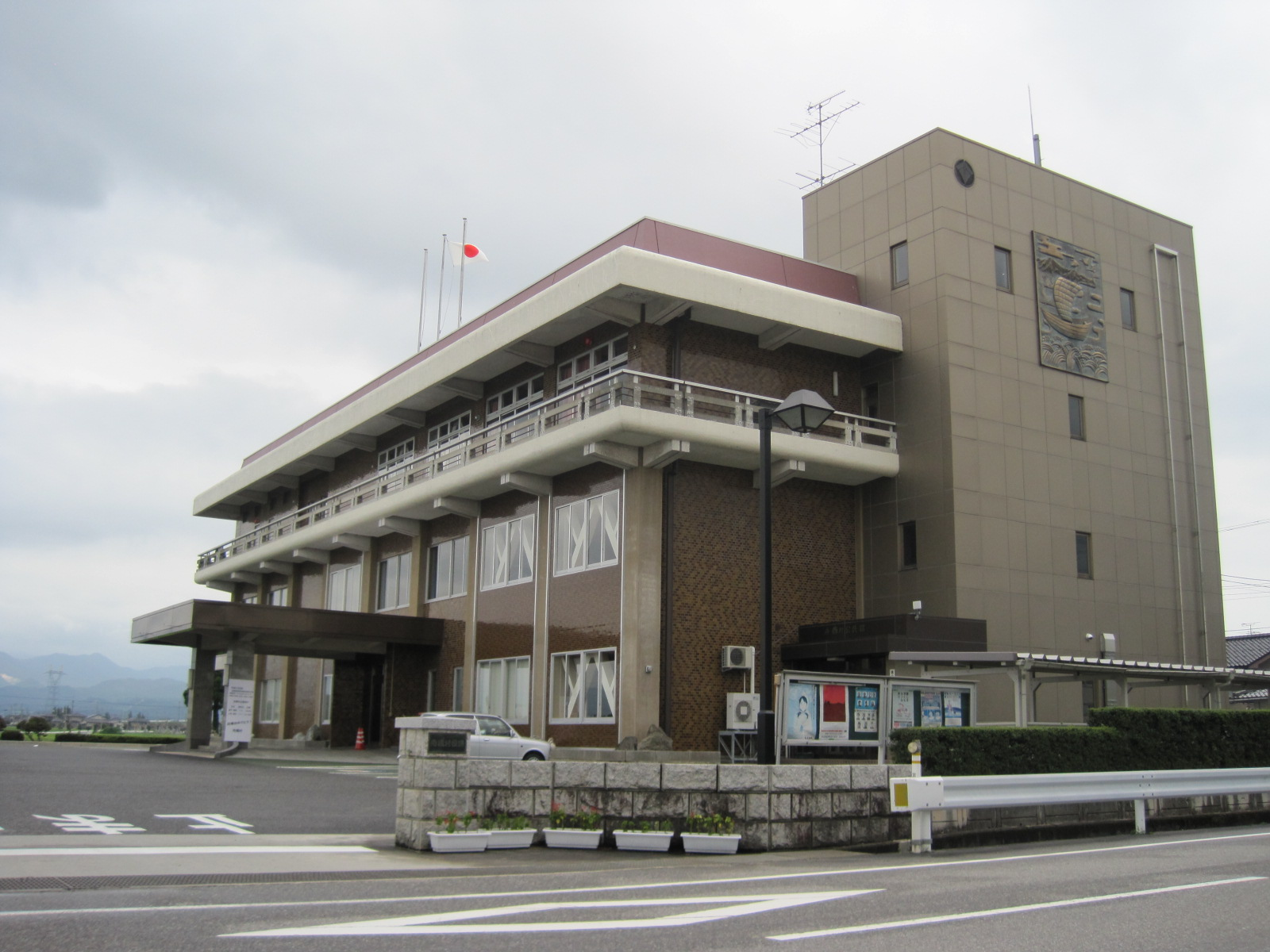
- Funahashi Village Office

- Flag Seal

- Location of Funahashi in Toyama Prefecture

- Coordinates: 36°42′12.7″N 137°18′26.5″E
- Country: Japan
- Region: Chūbu (Hokuriku)
- Prefecture: Toyama
- District: Nakaniikawa

Area
  - Total: 3.47 km^{2} (1.34 sq mi)

Population (February 2024)
  - Total: 3,304
  - Density: 952/km^{2} (2,470/sq mi)
- Time zone: UTC+9 (Japan Standard Time)
- Symbols
  - Flower: Satsuki azalea
- Address: 55 Busshōji, Funahashi-mura, Nakaniikawa-gun, Toyama-ken 930-0295
- Website: Official website

Funahashi (舟橋村, Funahashi-mura) is a village located in Nakaniikawa District, Toyama Prefecture, Japan. As of 1 February 2024, the village had an estimated population of 3,304 in 1195 households and a population density of 952 inhabitants per square kilometre (2,470/sq mi). The total area of the town was 3.47 square kilometres (1.34 sq mi), making it the smallest municipality in Japan in terms of area.

== Geography ==
Funahashi is located in central Toyama Prefecture.

=== Surrounding municipalities ===
- Toyama Prefecture
  - Kamiichi
  - Tateyama
  - Toyama

=== Climate ===
The town has a humid subtropical climate (Köppen Cfa) characterized by hot summers and cold winters with heavy snowfall. The average annual temperature in Funahashi is 13.9 °C. The average annual rainfall is 2306 mm with September as the wettest month. The temperatures are highest on average in August, at around 26.4 °C, and lowest in January, at around 2.6 °C.

== Demographics ==
Per Japanese census data, the population of Funahashi has more than doubled over the past 30 years.

Historical population
Year	Pop.	±%
1970	1,357	—
1980	1,360	+0.2%
1990	1,371	+0.8%
2000	2,153	+57.0%
2010	2,967	+37.8%
2020	3,132	+5.6%

== History ==
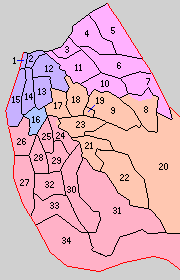
Map of Nakaniikawa district in Meiji era, with Funahashi labelled no. 16

The area of present-day Funahashi was part of ancient Etchū Province. The modern village of Funahashi was created with the establishment of the municipalities system on April 1, 1889. Funahashi is the only village left in Toyama prefecture, after any other villages were merged with towns or cities.

== Economy ==
Agriculture (rice, edamame, acorn squash) was traditionally the mainstay of the local economy; however, the village has increasingly become a bedroom community for nearby Toyama.

== Education ==
Funahashi has one public elementary school and one public middle school operated by the village government. The village does not have a high school.

== Transportation ==
=== Railway ===
- Toyama Chihō Railway Main Line
  - Etchū-Funahashi

=== Highway ===
- The village is not on any national highway or expressway
