= Sangō Station =

Sangō Station (三郷駅) is the name of three train stations in Japan:

- Sangō Station (Aichi) - Meitetsu Seto Line
- Sangō Station (Nara) - JR West Kansai Main Line (Yamatoji Line)
- Etchū-Sangō Station - Toyama Chiho Railway Main Line
