= Naka-Namerikawa Station =

Railway station in Namerikawa, Toyama Prefecture, Japan

Naka-Namerikawa Station 中滑川駅
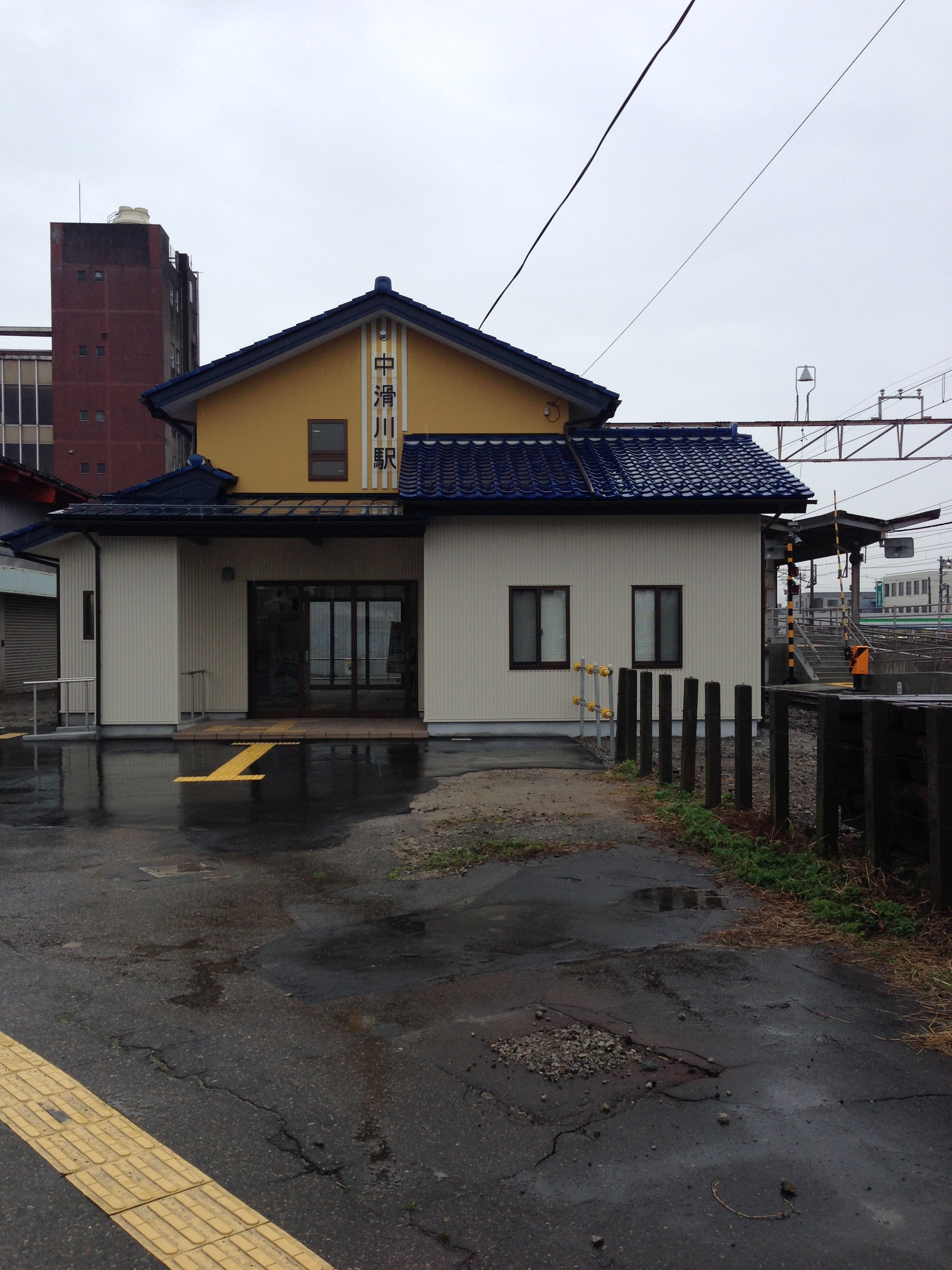
- Naka-Namerikawa Station in March 2009

General information
- Location: 39 Tanaka Shinmachi, Namerikawa-shi, Toyama-ken 936-0056; Japan
- Coordinates: 36.7621°N 137.3399°E
- Operator: Toyama Chihō Railway
- Line: ■ Toyama Chihō Railway Main Line
- Distance: 20.6 from Dentetsu-Toyama
- Platforms: 1 island platform
- Tracks: 2

Other information
- Status: Staffed
- Website: Official website

History
- Opened: 28 February 1914

Passengers
- FY2015: 770
Location
- Location within Japan

Naka-Namerikawa Station (中滑川駅, Naka-Namerikawa-eki) is a railway station in the city of Namerikawa, Toyama, Japan, operated by the private railway operator Toyama Chihō Railway.

== Lines ==
Naka-Namerikawa Station is served by the Toyama Chihō Railway Main Line, and is 20.6 kilometers from the starting point of the line at Dentetsu-Toyama.

== Station layout ==
The station has one ground-level island platform serving two tracks, connected to the wooden station building by a level crossing. The station is staffed on weekdays.

=== Platforms ===
1	■ Toyama Chihō Railway Main Line	for Dentetsu Toyama
2	■ Toyama Chihō Railway Main Line	for Dentetsu-Uozu and Unazuki-Onsen

== History ==
Naka-Namerikawa Station was opened on 28 February 1914.

== Adjacent stations ==
«	Service	»
Toyama Chihō Railway Main Line
Kamiichi	Limited Express	Dentetsu-Uozu
Naka-Kazumi	Rapid Express	Namerikawa
Naka-Kazumi	Express	Namerikawa
Nishi-Namerikawa	Local	Namerikawa

== Passenger statistics ==
In fiscal 2015, the station was used by 770 passengers daily.

== Surrounding area ==
- Namerikawa City Hall
- Namerikawa Post Office

== See also ==
- List of railway stations in Japan
