= Kurobeko Station =

Kurobeko Station 黒部湖駅
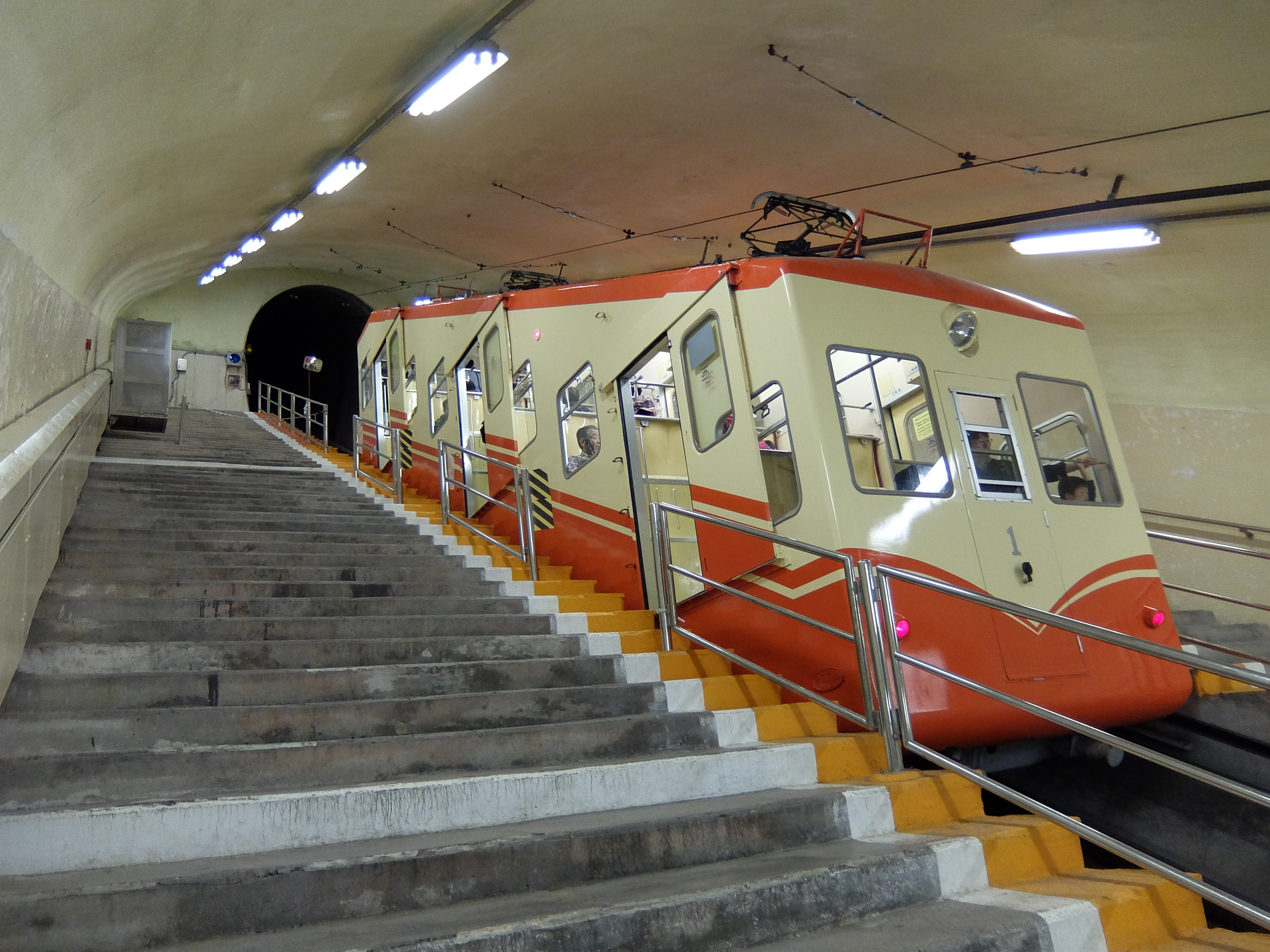

General information
- Location: Tateyama, Nakaniikawa District, Toyama Prefecture, Japan
- Coordinates: 36°34′00″N 137°39′30″E
Location

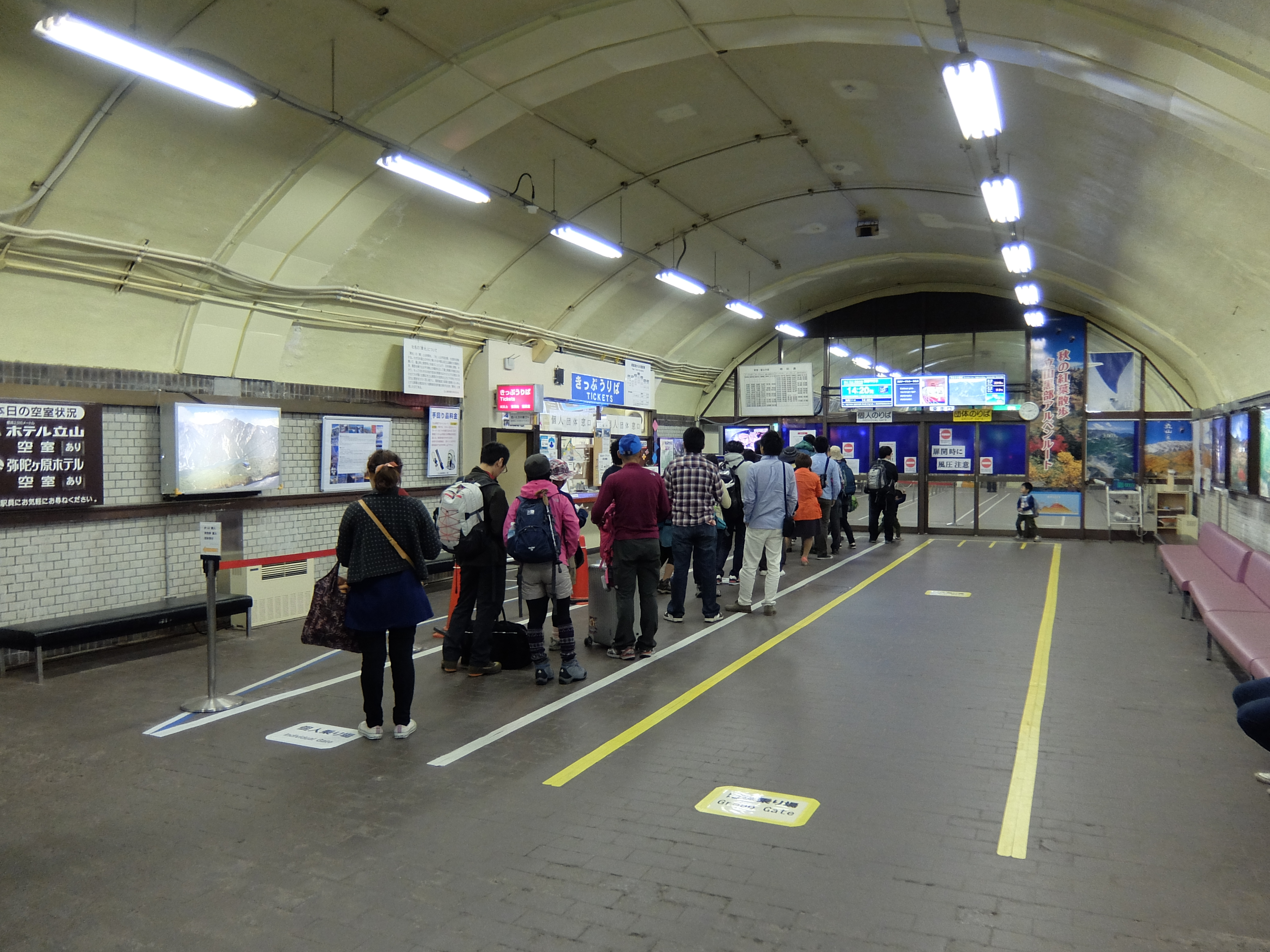
Passenger queue at Kurobeko Station

Kurobeko Station (黒部湖駅, Kurobeko-eki) is a funicular station in Tateyama, Nakaniikawa District, Toyama Prefecture, Japan.

== Lines ==
- Tateyama Kurobe Kankō
  - Kurobe Cable Car (Tateyama Kurobe Alpine Route)

== Adjacent stations ==
«	Service	»
Kurobe Cable Car
Kurobedaira	-	Terminus
