= Uchiyama Station =

Railway station in Kurobe, Toyama Prefecture, Japan

Uchiyama Station 内山駅
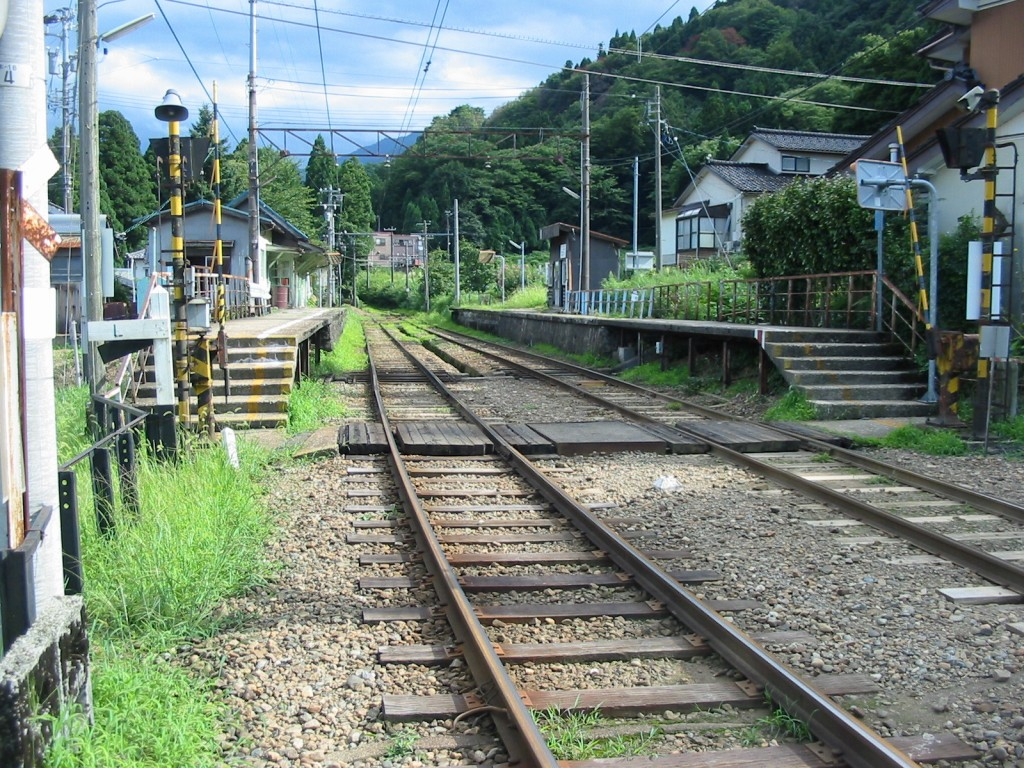
- Uchiyama Station in August 2008

General information
- Location: 1675 Uchiyama, Unatsuki-machi, Kurobe-shi, Toyama-ken 938-0281; Japan
- Coordinates: 36.8468°N 137.5570°E
- Operator: Toyama Chihō Railway
- Line: ■ Toyama Chihō Railway Main Line
- Distance: 48.7 from Dentetsu-Toyama
- Platforms: 2 side platforms
- Tracks: 2

Other information
- Status: Unstaffed
- Website: Official website

History
- Opened: 21 November 1923

Passengers
- FY2015: 77 daily
Location
- Location within Japan

Uchiyama Station (内山駅, Uchiyama-eki) is a railway station in the city of Kurobe, Toyama, Japan, operated by the private railway operator Toyama Chihō Railway.

== Lines ==
Uchiyama Station is served by the Toyama Chihō Railway Main Line, and is 48.7 kilometers from the starting point of the line at Dentetsu-Toyama.

== Station layout ==
The station has two ground-levelopposed side platforms connected by a level crossing. The station is unattended.

== History ==
Uchiyama Station was opened on 21 November 1923.

== Adjacent stations ==
«	Service	»
Toyama Chihō Railway Main Line
Limited Express: Does not stop at this station
Aimoto	Rapid Express	Otozawa
Aimoto	Express	Otozawa
Aimoto	Local	Otozawa

== Surrounding area ==
- Kurobe River

== See also ==
- List of railway stations in Japan
