= Otozawa Station =

Railway station in Kurobe, Toyama Prefecture, Japan

Otozawa Station 音沢駅
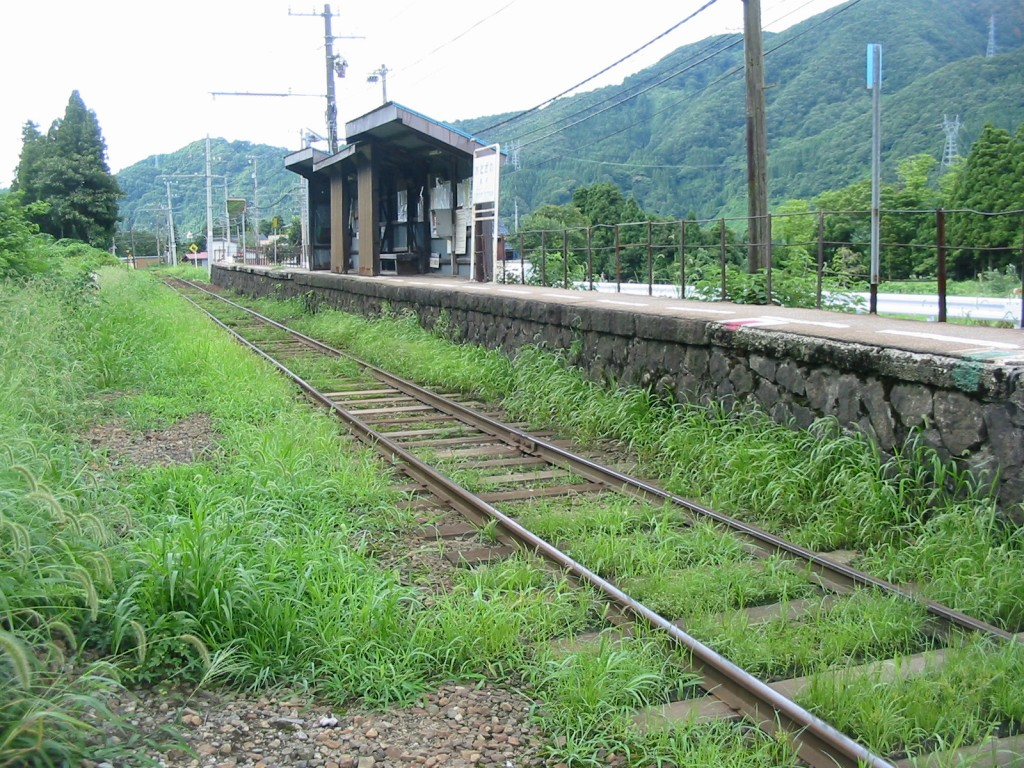
- Otozawa Station in August 2008

General information
- Location: 3993-2 Uchiyama, Unatsuki-machi, Kurobe-shi, Toyama-ken 938-0864; Japan
- Coordinates: 36.8406°N 137.5596°E
- Operator: Toyama Chihō Railway
- Line: ■ Toyama Chihō Railway Main Line
- Distance: 49.5 from Dentetsu-Toyama
- Platforms: 1 side platform
- Tracks: 1

Other information
- Status: Unstaffed
- Website: Official website

History
- Opened: 21 November 1923

Passengers
- FY2015: 83 daily
Location
- Location within Japan

Otozawa Station (音沢駅, Otozawa-eki) is a railway station in the city of Kurobe, Toyama, Japan, operated by the private railway operator Toyama Chihō Railway.

== Lines ==
Otozawa Station is served by the Toyama Chihō Railway Main Line, and is 49.5 kilometers from the starting point of the line at Dentetsu-Toyama.

== Station layout ==
The station has one ground-level side platform serving a single bi-directional track. There is no station building, but only a shelter on the platform. The station is unattended.

== History ==
Otozawa Station was opened on 21 November 1923.

== Adjacent stations ==
«	Service	»
Toyama Chihō Railway Main Line
Limited Express: Does not stop at this station
Uchiyama	Rapid Express	Unazuki Onsen
Uchiyama	Express	Unazuki Onsen
Uchiyama	Local	Unazuki Onsen

== Surrounding area ==
- Kurobe River

== See also ==
- List of railway stations in Japan
