= Shin-Ainoki Station =

Railway station in Kamiichi, Toyama Prefecture, Japan

Shin-Ainoki Station 新相ノ木駅
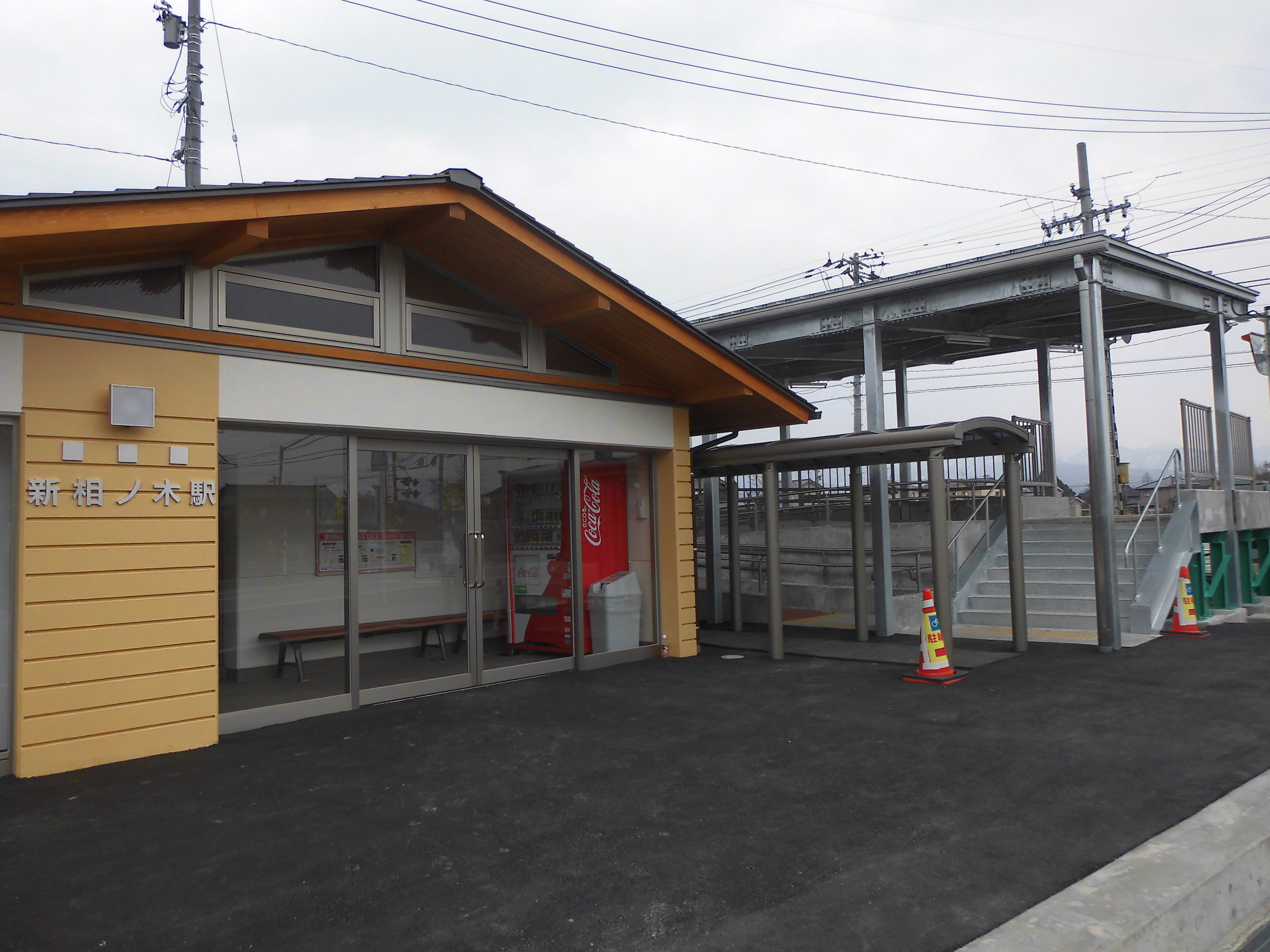
- Shin-Ainoki Station in February 2014

General information
- Location: 4-91 Kamikyōden, Kamiichi-machi, Nakaniikawa-gun Toyama-ken 930-0372; Japan
- Coordinates: 36°42′11.26″N 137°20′32.2″E
- Operator: Toyama Chihō Railway
- Line: ■ Toyama Chihō Railway Main Line
- Distance: 12.1 from Dentetsu-Toyama
- Platforms: 1 side platform
- Tracks: 1

Other information
- Status: Unstaffed
- Website: Official website

History
- Opened: 26 December 2013
Location
- Location within Japan

Shin-Ainoki Station (新相ノ木駅, Shin-Ainoki eki) is a railway station in the town of Kamiichi, Toyama, Japan, operated by the private railway operator Toyama Chihō Railway.

== Lines ==
Shin-Ainoki Station is served by the Toyama Chihō Railway Main Line, and is 12.1 kilometres (7.5 miles) from the starting point of the line at Dentetsu-Toyama.

== Station layout ==
The station has one side platform serving a single bi-directional track. The station is unattended.

== History ==
Shin-Ainoki Station was opened on 26 December 2013.

== Adjacent stations ==
«	Service	»
Toyama Chihō Railway Main Line
Limited Express: Does not stop at this station
Rapid Express: Does not stop at this station
Express: Does not stop at this station
Ainoki	Local	Kamiichi

== See also ==
- List of railway stations in Japan
