= Toyama Chihō Railway Main Line =

Railway line in Toyama prefecture, Japan

Toyama Chiho Railway Main Line
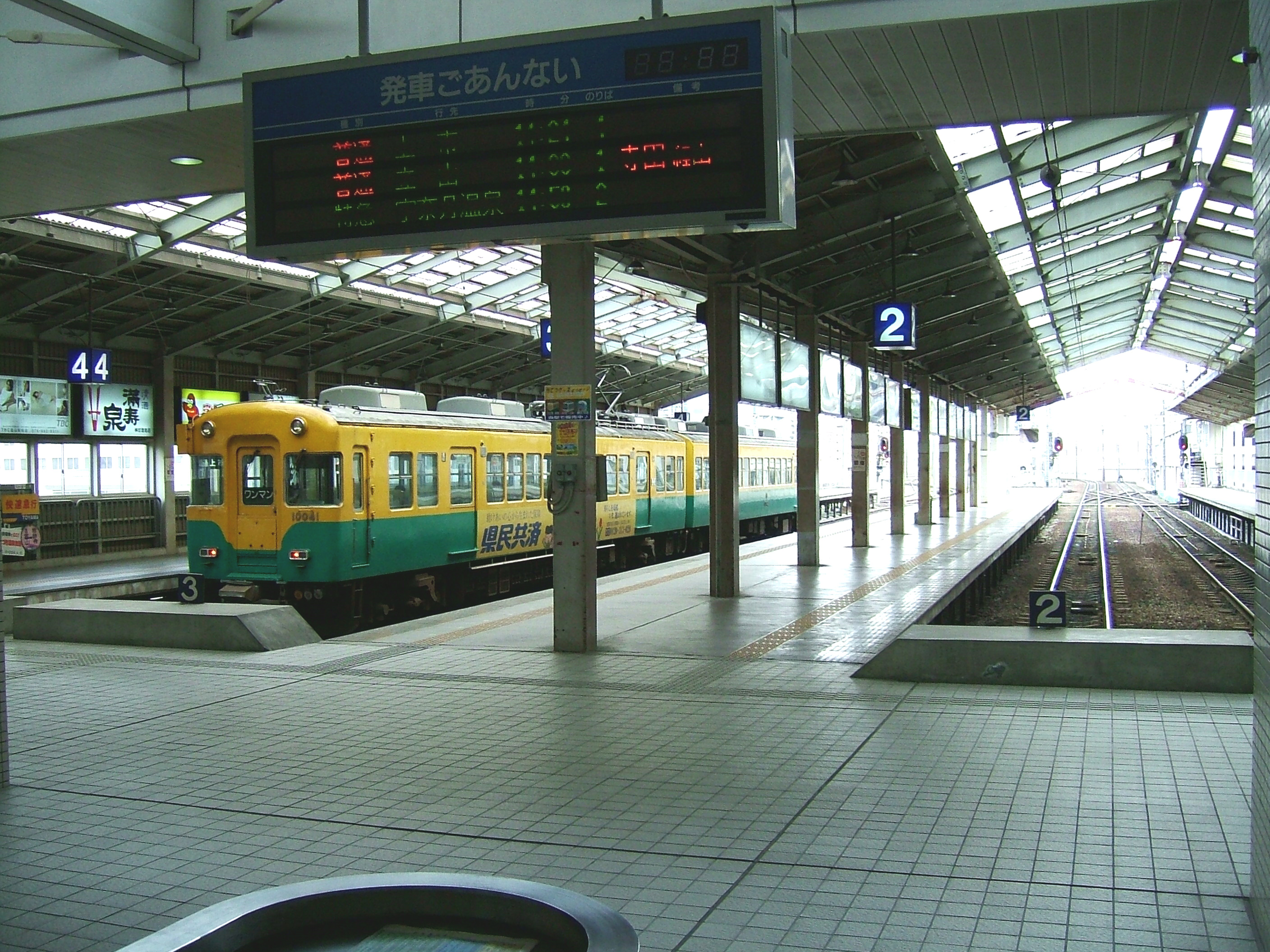
- Dentetsu Toyama Station

Overview
- Native name: 富山地鉄本線
- Status: Operational
- Owner: Toyama Chihō Railway
- Locale: Toyama Prefecture
- Termini: Dentetsu Toyama Station; Unazuki Onsen Station
- Stations: 41

Service
- Type: Heavy rail
- Operator: Toyama Chihō Railway

History
- Opened: 25 June 1913; 113 years ago

Technical
- Line length: 53.3 km (33.1 mi)
- Track gauge: 1,067 mm (3 ft 6 in)
- Electrification: 1,500 V DC
- Operating speed: 95 km/h (59 mph)
Route map
Line Map

The Toyama Chihō Railway Main Line (富山地方鉄道本線, Toyama Chihō Tetsudō Hon-sen) is a Japanese railway line that connects Dentetsu-Toyama Station in Toyama, Toyama with Unazuki Onsen Station in Kurobe, Toyama. It is owned and run by Toyama Chihō Railway.

== Station list ==
No.	Name	Japanese	Distance (km)	Express	Rapid Express	Limited Express	Connections	Location	
T01	Dentetsu-Toyama	電鉄富山	0.0	●	●	●	Hokuriku Shinkansen (Toyama Station) Takayama Main Line (Toyama Station); Ainokaze Toyama Railway Line (Toyama Station) Toyama Chihō Railway: Toyama City Tram Line & Toyamakō Line light rail (Toyama Station)	Toyama	Toyama
T02	Inarimachi	稲荷町	1.6	▲	●	|	Toyama Chihō Railway Fujikoshi Line	Toyama	Toyama
T03	Shinjō-Tanaka	新庄田中	2.5	▲	↑	|		Toyama	Toyama
T04	Higashi-Shinjō	東新庄	3.6	▲	↑	|		Toyama	Toyama
T05	Etchū-Ebara	越中荏原	4.7	▲	↑	|		Toyama	Toyama
T06	Etchū-Sangō	越中三郷	7.0	▲	↑	|		Toyama	Toyama
T07	Etchū-Funahashi	越中舟橋	8.5	▲	↑	|		Funahashi	Toyama
T08	Terada	寺田	9.8	●	●	●	Toyama Chihō Railway Tateyama Line	Tateyama	Toyama
T09	Etchū-Izumi	越中泉	10.5	|	↑	|		Tateyama	Toyama
T10	Ainoki	相ノ木	11.3	|	↑	|		Kamiichi	Toyama
T11	Shin-Ainoki	新相ノ木	12.1	|	↑	|		Kamiichi	Toyama
T12	Kamiichi	上市	13.3	●	●	●		Kamiichi	Toyama
T13	Shin-Miyakawa	新宮川	15.1	▲	▲	|		Kamiichi	Toyama
T14	Naka-Kazumi	中加積	17.1	●	●	|		Namerikawa	Toyama
T15	Nishi-Kazumi	西加積	18.7	|	↑	|		Namerikawa	Toyama
T16	Nishi-Namerikawa	西滑川	19.8	|	↑	|		Namerikawa	Toyama
T17	Naka-Namerikawa	中滑川	20.6	●	●	●		Namerikawa	Toyama
T18	Namerikawa	滑川	21.8	●	●	|	Ainokaze Toyama Railway Line	Namerikawa	Toyama
T19	Hamakazumi	浜加積	23.2	|	↑	|		Namerikawa	Toyama
T20	Hayatsukikazumi	早月加積	24.4	▲	▲	|		Namerikawa	Toyama
T21	Etchū-Nakamura	越中中村	25.6	|	↑	|		Namerikawa	Toyama
T22	Nishi-Uozu	西魚津	27.6	●	▲	|		Uozu	Toyama
T23	Dentetsu-Uozu	電鉄魚津	28.9	●	●	●		Uozu	Toyama
T24	Shin-Uozu	新魚津	30.2	●	●	●	Ainokaze Toyama Railway Line (Uozu)	Uozu	Toyama
T25	Kyōden	経田	32.9	●	●	|		Uozu	Toyama
T26	Dentetsu-Ishida	電鉄石田	34.9	●	●	|		Kurobe	Toyama
T27	Dentetsu Kurobe	電鉄黒部	37.2	●	●	●		Kurobe	Toyama
T28	Higashi-Mikkaichi	東三日市	37.8	●	●	●		Kurobe	Toyama
T29	Ogyū	荻生	38.6	●	●	|		Kurobe	Toyama
T30	Nagaya	長屋	39.6	●	●	|		Kurobe	Toyama
T31	Shin-Kurobe	新黒部	40.7	●	●	●	Hokuriku Shinkansen (Kurobe-Unazukionsen)	Kurobe	Toyama
T32	Shitayama	舌山	41.0	●	●	|		Kurobe	Toyama
T33	Wakaguri	若栗	41.7	●	●	|		Kurobe	Toyama
T34	Tochiya	栃屋	42.8	●	●	|		Kurobe	Toyama
T35	Urayama	浦山	44.3	●	●	●		Kurobe	Toyama
T36	Oritateguchi	下立口	45.6	●	●	|		Kurobe	Toyama
T37	Oritate	下立	46.3	●	●	|		Kurobe	Toyama
T38	Aimoto	愛本	47.6	●	●	●		Kurobe	Toyama
T39	Uchiyama	内山	48.7	●	●	|		Kurobe	Toyama
T40	Otozawa	音沢	49.5	●	●	|		Kurobe	Toyama
T41	Unazuki Onsen	宇奈月温泉	53.3	●	●	●	Kurobe Gorge Railway (Unazuki)	Kurobe	Toyama

== History ==
The first section of what is now this line was opened by Tateyama Light Railway as a 762 mm (2 ft 6 in) gauge line between Gohyakkoku (on the Toyama Chiho Railway Tateyama Line) and Namerikawa in 1913.

The Kurobe Railway opened the Dentetsu Kurobe to Unazuki Onsen section as a 1,067 mm (3 ft 6 in) gauge line between 1922 and 1923.

In 1932, the Toyama Electric Railway acquired the Tateyama Light Railway, and built a line from Dentetsu-Toyama to Namerikawa, regauging some of the original line to 1,067 mm gauge, and electrifying it at 1,500 V DC.

The Namerikawa to Dentetsu Kurobe section was opened between 1935 and 1936, and the Kurobe Railway was merged with the Toyama Electric Railway in 1943 to create the current company, with the electrification to Unazuki Onsen commissioned the same year.

CTC signalling was commissioned on the line between 1966 and 1967, and the Dentetsu-Toyama to Inarimachi section was double-tracked in 1969. Freight services ceased in 1983.

== See also ==
- Tateyama Kurobe Alpine Route
