= Kamiichi =

Kamiichi 上市町
- Town
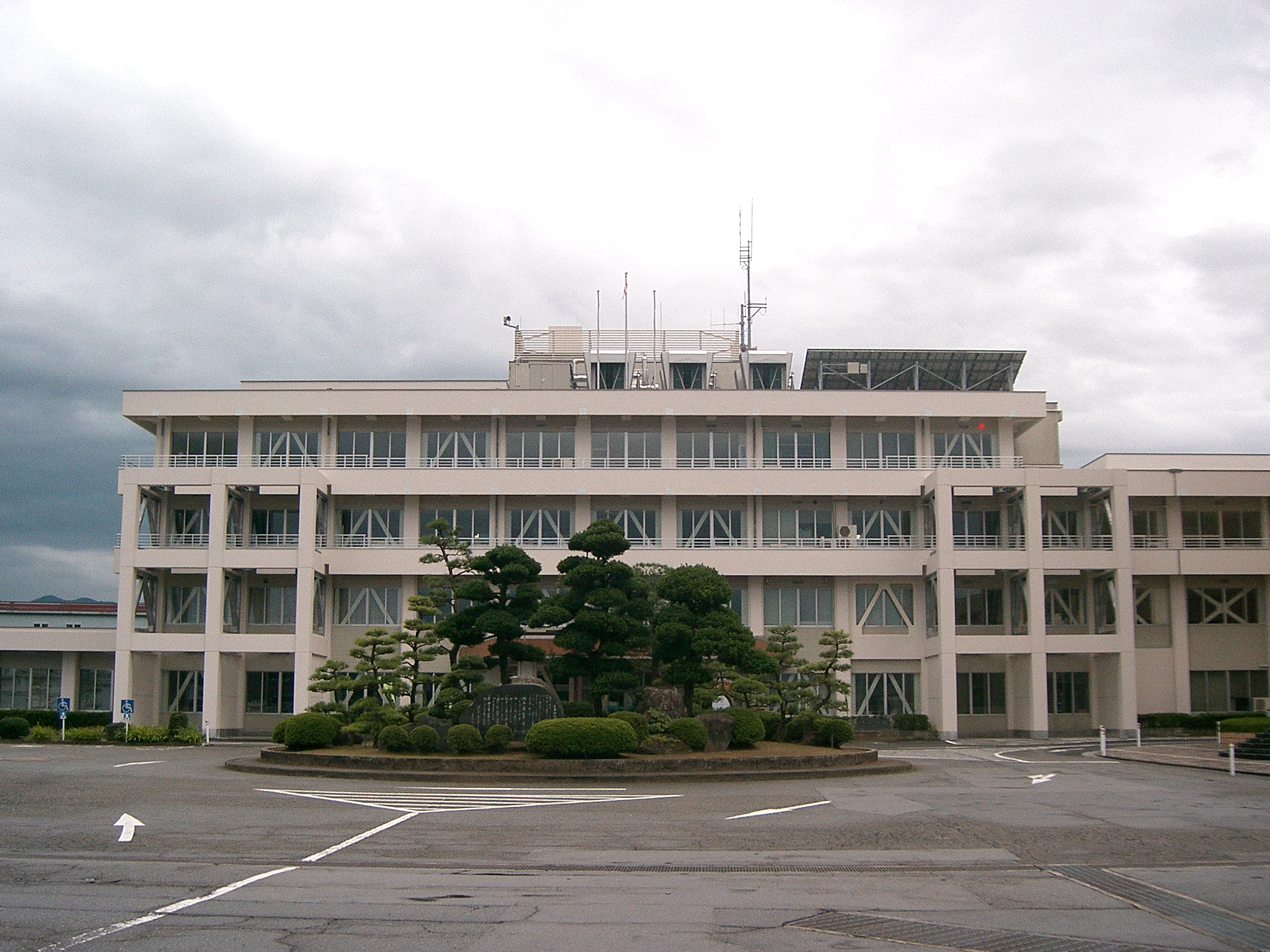
- Kamiichi Town Office

- Flag Seal

- Location of Kamiichi in Toyama Prefecture

- Coordinates: 36°42′N 137°22′E
- Country: Japan
- Region: Chūbu (Hokuriku)
- Prefecture: Toyama
- District: Nakaniikawa

Area
  - Total: 236.71 km^{2} (91.39 sq mi)

Population (June 2018)
  - Total: 20,827
  - Density: 87.985/km^{2} (227.88/sq mi)
- Time zone: UTC+9 (Japan Standard Time)
- Phone number: 076-472-1111
- Address: Hoon-ji 1-banchi, Kamiichi-machi, Nakaniikawa-gun, Toyama-ken 930-0393
- Climate: Cfa
- Website: www.town.kamiichi.toyama.jp
- Symbols
- Flower: Gentiana scabra

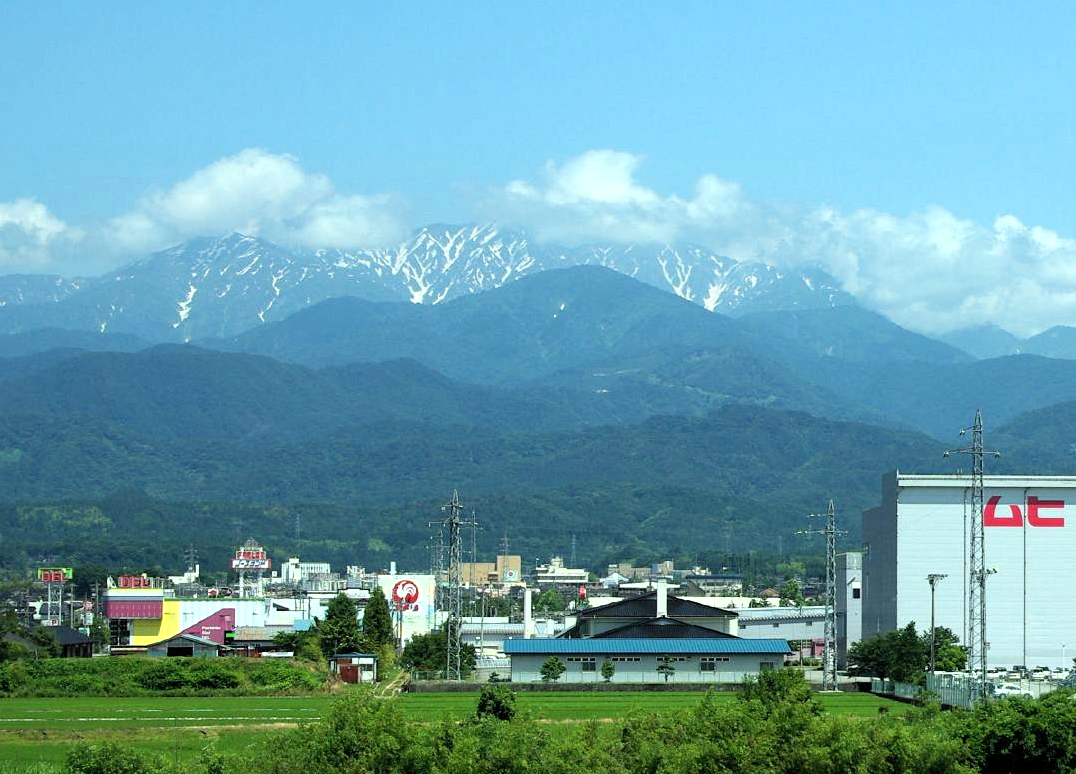
Panorama of Kamiichi

Kamiichi (上市町, Kamiichi-machi) is a town located in Nakaniikawa District, Toyama Prefecture, Japan. As of 1 June 2018, the town had an estimated population of 20,827 in 7958 households and a population density of 88 persons per km^{2}. The total area of the town was 236.71 square kilometres (91.39 sq mi).

== Geography ==
Kamiichi is located in east-central Toyama Prefecture, approximately 15 kilometers to the east of the capital of Toyama city. Most of the town is very mountainous, with peaks rising to almost 3000 meters in the southeast. The 2999 meter Mount Tsurugi is located in Kamiichi.

=== Surrounding municipalities ===
- Toyama Prefecture
  - Kurobe
  - Namerikawa
  - Toyama
  - Uozu

=== Climate ===
The town has a humid subtropical climate (Köppen Cfa) characterized by hot summers and cold winters with heavy snowfall. The average annual temperature in Kamiichi is 13.8 °C. The average annual rainfall is 2243 mm with September as the wettest month. The temperatures are highest on average in August, at around 26.4 °C, and lowest in January, at around 2.4 °C.

Climate data for Kamiichi (1991−2020 normals, extremes 1979−present)
Month	Jan	Feb	Mar	Apr	May	Jun	Jul	Aug	Sep	Oct	Nov	Dec	Year
Record high °C (°F)	18.5 (65.3)	21.2 (70.2)	25.5 (77.9)	29.6 (85.3)	31.3 (88.3)	34.4 (93.9)	36.3 (97.3)	36.6 (97.9)	37.4 (99.3)	32.2 (90.0)	29.4 (84.9)	23.8 (74.8)	37.4 (99.3)
Mean daily maximum °C (°F)	4.0 (39.2)	4.8 (40.6)	8.9 (48.0)	15.7 (60.3)	20.9 (69.6)	23.8 (74.8)	27.7 (81.9)	29.3 (84.7)	24.9 (76.8)	19.3 (66.7)	13.6 (56.5)	7.3 (45.1)	16.7 (62.0)
Daily mean °C (°F)	0.3 (32.5)	0.4 (32.7)	3.6 (38.5)	9.9 (49.8)	15.4 (59.7)	19.2 (66.6)	23.2 (73.8)	24.3 (75.7)	20.1 (68.2)	14.2 (57.6)	8.5 (47.3)	3.1 (37.6)	11.9 (53.3)
Mean daily minimum °C (°F)	−3.1 (26.4)	−3.6 (25.5)	−0.8 (30.6)	4.6 (40.3)	10.3 (50.5)	15.2 (59.4)	19.6 (67.3)	20.3 (68.5)	16.2 (61.2)	10.0 (50.0)	4.2 (39.6)	−0.3 (31.5)	7.7 (45.9)
Record low °C (°F)	−13.8 (7.2)	−14.1 (6.6)	−9.8 (14.4)	−5.0 (23.0)	1.4 (34.5)	7.1 (44.8)	12.7 (54.9)	12.9 (55.2)	7.1 (44.8)	1.1 (34.0)	−3.9 (25.0)	−13.1 (8.4)	−14.1 (6.6)
Average precipitation mm (inches)	293.5 (11.56)	209.9 (8.26)	217.5 (8.56)	190.7 (7.51)	198.3 (7.81)	230.5 (9.07)	334.2 (13.16)	263.0 (10.35)	260.7 (10.26)	229.7 (9.04)	273.0 (10.75)	319.8 (12.59)	3,020.7 (118.93)
Average precipitation days (≥ 1.0 mm)	22.7	18.9	17.7	14.2	13.3	13.2	16.6	12.6	13.9	14.4	17.5	21.9	196.9
Mean monthly sunshine hours	52.8	73.3	111.0	153.4	184.5	136.9	133.1	174.7	121.1	118.9	88.1	57.8	1,405.5
Source: Japan Meteorological Agency

== Demographics ==
Per Japanese census data, the population of Kamiichi has decreased slightly over the past 40 years.

Historical population
Year	Pop.	±%
1970	23,717	—
1980	24,028	+1.3%
1990	23,671	−1.5%
2000	23,362	−1.3%
2010	21,965	−6.0%
2020	19,351	−11.9%

== History ==
The area of present-day Kamiichi was part of ancient Etchū Province. The town of Kamiichi was created with the establishment of the municipalities system on April 1, 1889.

== Education ==
Kamiichi has six public elementary schools and one public middle school operated by the town government, and one public high school operated by the Toyama Prefectural Board of Education.

== Transportation ==
=== Railway ===
- Toyama Chihō Railway Main Line
  - Ainoki - Shin-Ainoki - Kamiichi - Shin-Miyakawa

=== Highway ===
- National Route 8

== Local attractions ==
- Ōiwa-san Nisseki-ji, Buddhist temple with Nara period bas-relief carvings; a National Historic Site
- Kamiichi Kurokawa Sites, a number of archaeological sites with Heian to Kamakura period ruins registered as a National Historic Site.
- A traditional Japanese house that was used as a model for the house in the film Wolf Children (directed by Kamiichi native Mamoru Hosoda).

== In popular culture ==
Much of the 2012 film Wolf Children is set in Kamiichi.

== Notable people from Kamiichi ==
- Mamoru Hosoda, director
