= Kamiichi Station =

Railway station in Kamiichi, Toyama Prefecture, Japan

Kamiichi Station 上市駅
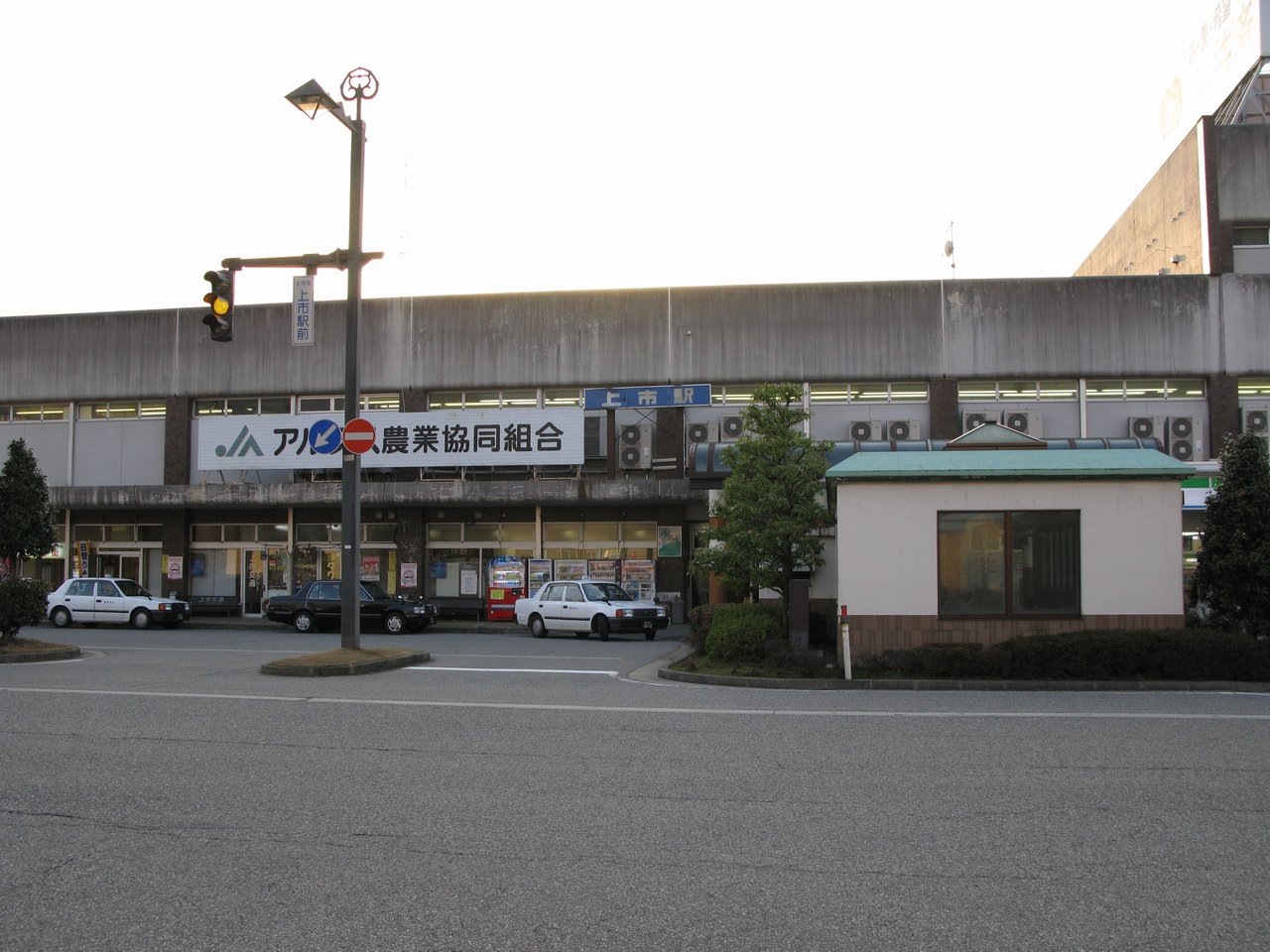
- Kamiichi Station in March 2008

General information
- Location: 4-2 Takasugi, Kamiichi-machi, Nakaxiikawa-gun, Toyama-ken 930-0314; Japan
- Coordinates: 36.7044°N 137.3576°E
- Operator: Toyama Chihō Railway
- Line: ■ Toyama Chihō Railway Main Line
- Distance: 13.3 from Dentetsu-Toyama
- Platforms: 2 bay platforms
- Tracks: 3

Other information
- Status: Staffed
- Website: Official website

History
- Opened: 15 August 1931

Passengers
- FY2015: 1,813
Location
- Location within Japan

Kamiichi Station (上市駅, Kamiichi-eki) is a railway station in the town of Kamiichi, Nakaniikawa District Toyama Prefecture, Japan, operated by the private railway operator Toyama Chihō Railway.

== Lines ==
Kamiichi Station is served by the Toyama Chihō Railway Main Line, and is 13.3 kilometers from the starting point of the line at Dentetsu-Toyama.

== Station layout ==
The station has two bay platform serving three tracks, with a three-story station building. The station is staffed.

=== Platforms ===
| 1 | ■ Toyama Chihō Railway Main Line | for Dentetsu Toyama |
| 2 | ■ Toyama Chihō Railway Main Line | for Dentetsu-Uozu and Unazuki-Onsen |
| 3 | ■ Toyama Chihō Railway Main Line | for Dentetsu Toyama (starting trains) |

== History ==
Kamiichi Station was opened on 15 August 1931.

== Adjacent stations ==
| « | Service | » |
Toyama Chihō Railway Main Line
| Terada | Limited Express | Naka-Namerikawa |
| Terada | Rapid Express | Shin-Miyakawa |
| Terada | Express | Shin-Miyakawa |
| Shin-Ainoki | Local | Shin-Miyakawa |

== Passenger statistics ==
In fiscal 2015, the station was used by 1813 passengers daily.

== Surrounding area ==
- Kamiichi Tourist Information Center

== See also ==
- List of railway stations in Japan
