= Nakaniikawa District =

District in Toyama prefecture, Japan

Coordinates: 36.632°N 137.502°E

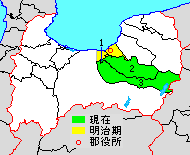
Map showing original extent of Nakaniikawa District in Toyama Prefecture: * yellow - areas formerly within the district borders during the early Meiji period * green - current borders: 1. Funahashi-mura; 2. Kamiichi-machi; 3. Tateyama-machi

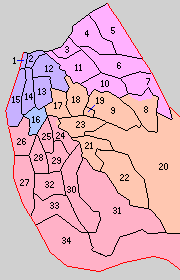
Colored areas are in this district.

Nakaniikawa (中新川郡, Nakaniikawa-gun) is a district located in Toyama Prefecture, Japan.

As of October 1, 2016, the district has an estimated population of 49,839 with a density of 91 persons per km^{2}. The total area is 547.55 km^{2}.

== Municipalities ==
The district consists of two towns and one village:

- Funahashi (Note: Classified as a village.)
- Kamiichi (Note: Classified as a town.)
- Tateyama

== History ==
=== District Timeline ===
- April 1, 1896 - Nakaniikawa District was created from a split within Kaminiikawa District, grouped by 5 towns and 29 villages.
