= Dentetsu-Uozu Station =

Railway station in Uozu, Toyama Prefecture, Japan

Dentetsu-Uozu Station 電鉄魚津駅
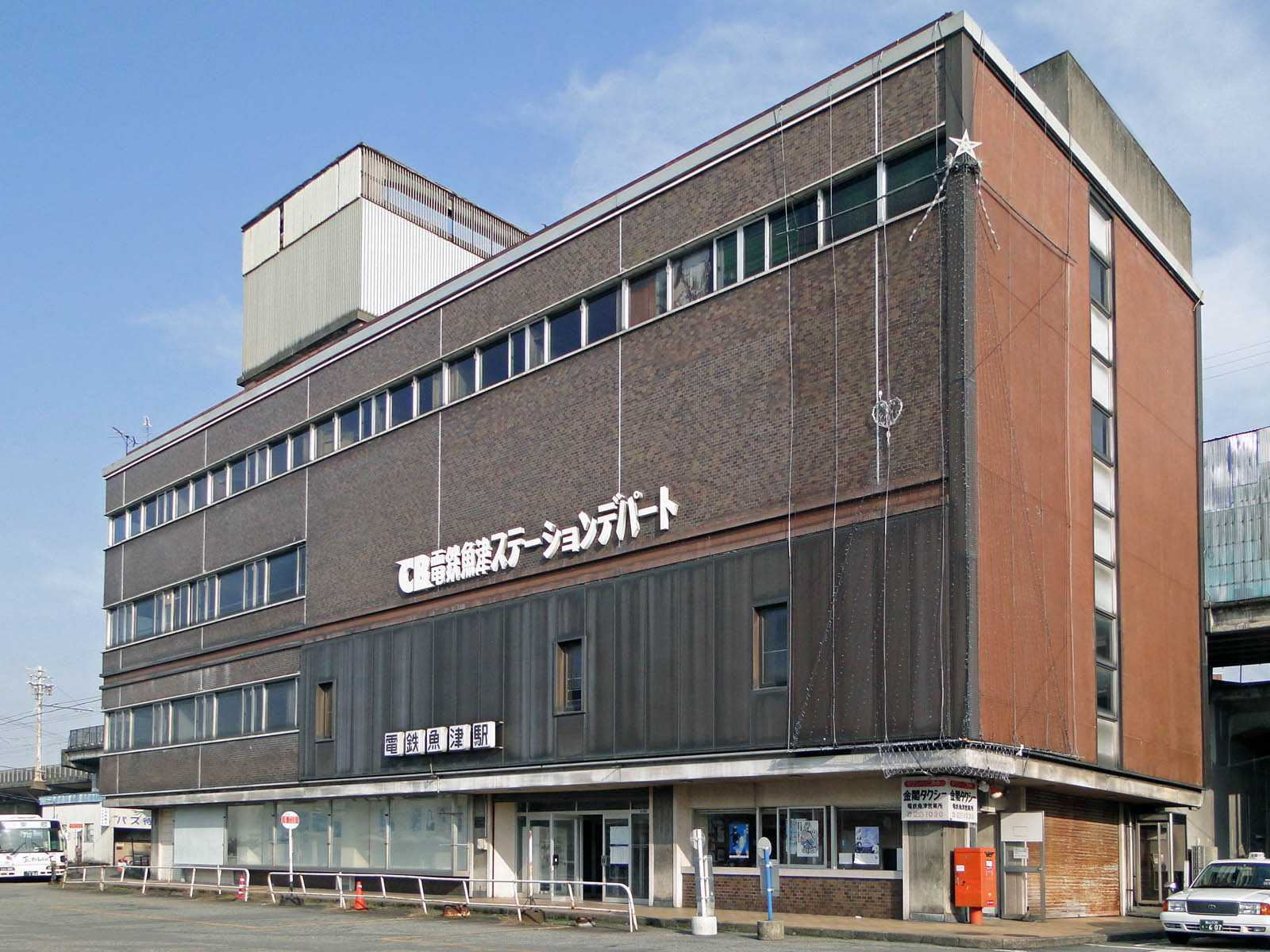
- Dentetsu-Uozu Station in November 2010

General information
- Location: 10-3 Bunka-machi, Uozu-shi, Toyama-ken 937-0805; Japan
- Coordinates: 36.8152°N 137.4003°E
- Operator: Toyama Chihō Railway
- Line: ■ Toyama Chihō Railway Main Line
- Distance: 28.9 from Dentetsu-Toyama
- Platforms: 1 side platform
- Tracks: 1

Other information
- Status: Staffed
- Website: Official website

History
- Opened: 5 June 1936

Passengers
- FY2015: 824
Location
- Location within Japan

Dentetsu-Uozu Station (電鉄魚津駅, Dentetsu-Uozu-eki) is a railway station in the city of Uozu, Toyama, Japan, operated by the private railway operator Toyama Chihō Railway.

== Lines ==
Dentetsu-Uozu Station is served by the Toyama Chihō Railway Main Line, and is 28.9 kilometers from the starting point of the line at Dentetsu-Toyama.

== Station layout ==
The station has one elevated side platform serving a single bi-directional track, with the station building located underneath. The station is staffed.

== History ==
Dentetsu-Uozu Station was opened on 5 June 1936.

== Adjacent stations ==
«	Service	»
Toyama Chihō Railway Main Line
Naka-Namerikawa	Limited Express	Shin-Uozu
Nishi-Uozu	Rapid Express	Shin-Uozu
Nishi-Uozu	Express	Shin-Uozu
Nishi-Uozu	Local	Shin-Uozu

== Passenger statistics ==
In fiscal 2015, the station was used by 824 passengers daily.

== Surrounding area ==
- Uozu Buried Forest Museum

== See also ==
- List of railway stations in Japan
