= Unazuki Onsen Station =

Railway station in Kurobe, Toyama Prefecture, Japan

Unazuki Onsen Station 宇奈月温泉駅
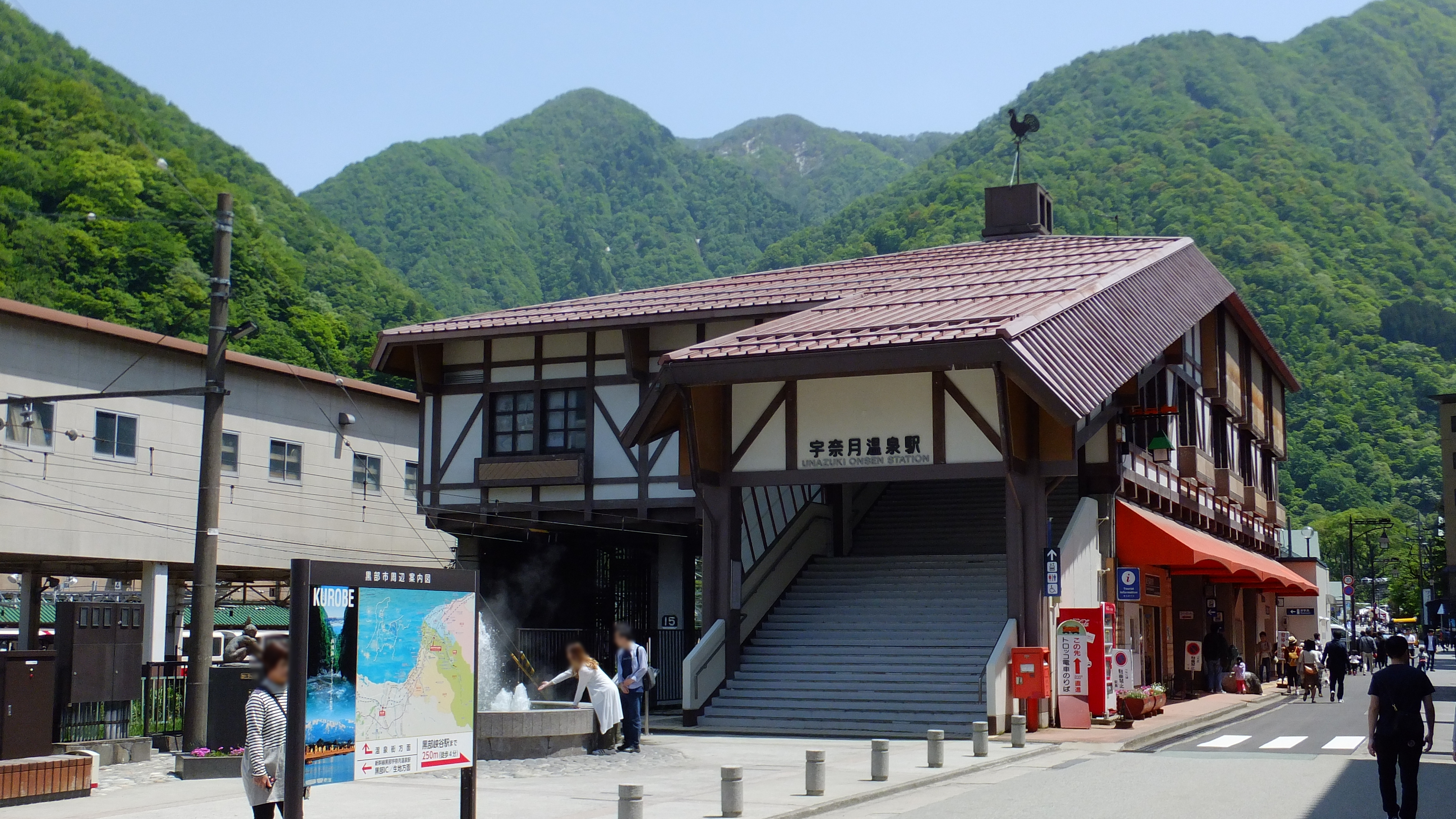
- Unazuki Onsen Station building

General information
- Location: 260 Unazuki Onsen, Kurobe-shi, Toyama-ken 938-0282; Japan
- Coordinates: 36.8158°N 137.5833°E
- Operator: Toyama Chihō Railway
- Line: ■ Toyama Chihō Railway Main Line
- Distance: 53,3 from Dentetsu-Toyama
- Platforms: 1 island platform
- Tracks: 2

Other information
- Status: Staffed
- Website: Official website

History
- Opened: 21 November 1923
- Former names: Momohara; Unazuki (until 1 August 1971)

Passengers
- FY2015: 1058 daily
Location
- Location within Japan

Unazuki Onsen Station (宇奈月温泉駅, Unazuki-onsen-eki) is a railway station in Unazuki, Kurobe, Toyama, Japan, operated by the private railway operator Toyama Chihō Railway. It is the terminus of the line. It is also located close to Unazuki Station on the narrow-gauge Kurobe Gorge Railway.

== Lines ==
Unazuki Onsen Station is served by the Toyama Chihō Railway Main Line, and is located 53.3 km from the starting point of the line at Dentetsu Toyama.

== Station layout ==
The station has one island platform with two tracks, ending with buffer stops. In former times, these tracks merged to enter a facility for loading and unloading narrow-gauge trucks with material for and from the construction of dams in the Kurobe River gorge.

== Adjacent stations ==
«	Service	»
Toyama Chihō Railway Main Line
Aimoto	Limited Express	Terminus
Otozawa	Rapid Express	Terminus
Otozawa	Express	Terminus
Otozawa	Local	Terminus

== History ==
The station opened on 21 November 1923, initially named Momohara Station (桃原駅). This was renamed Unazuki Station (宇奈月駅) on 21 February 1924, eventually becoming Unazuki Onsen Station on 1 August 1971.

== Passenger statistics ==
In fiscal 2015, the station was used by 1,058 passengers daily.

== Surrounding area ==
- Unazuki Onsen

== See also ==
- List of railway stations in Japan
