= Toyama Station =

Major railway station in Toyama, Toyama Prefecture, Japan

Coordinates: 36.701217°N 137.213209°E

Toyama Station 富山駅
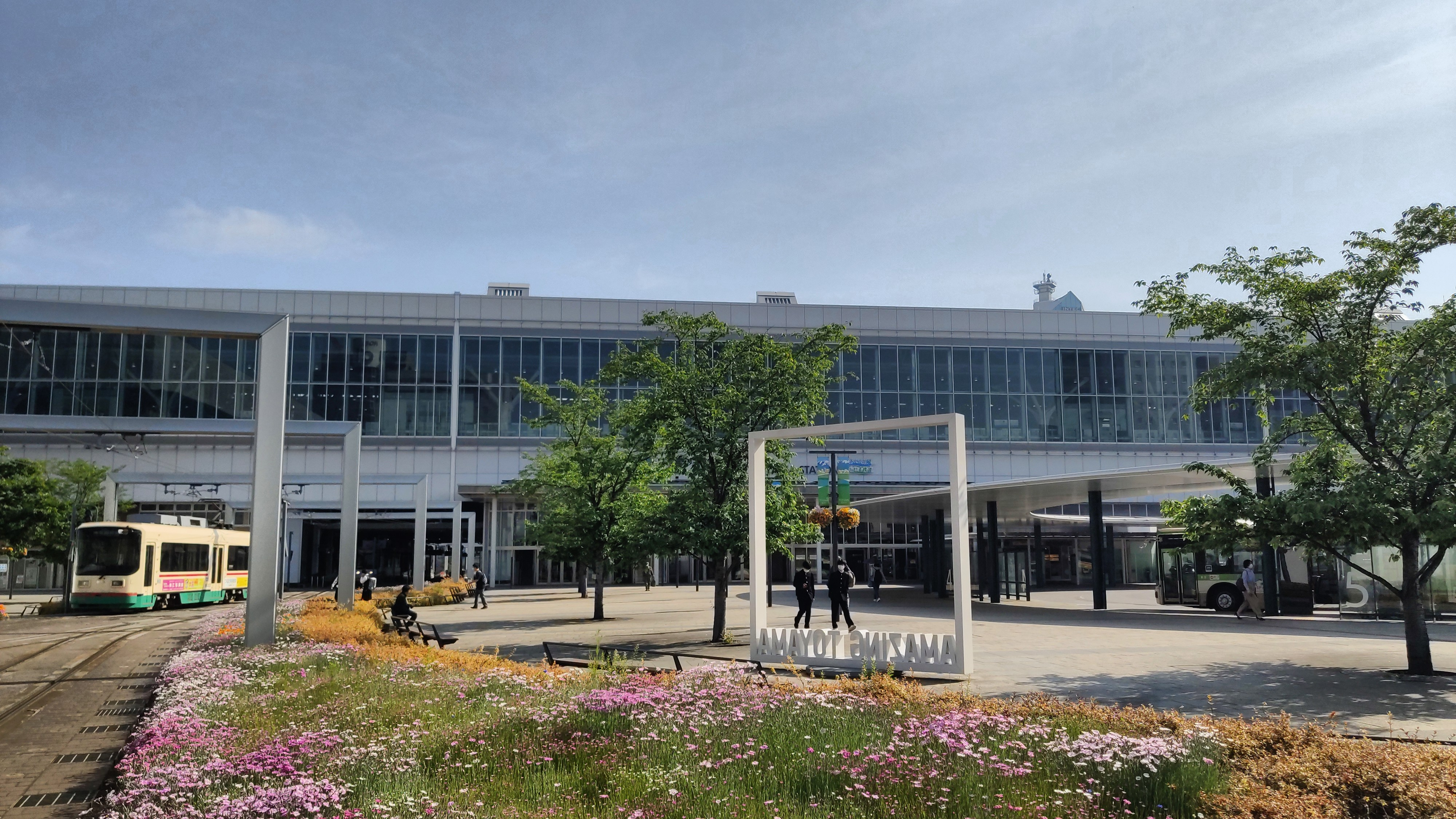
- South side in October 2021

General information
- Location: 1-227 Meirinchō, Toyama-shi; Toyama Prefecture; Japan
- Operator: JR West; Ainokaze Toyama Railway; Toyama Chihō Railway
- Lines: Hokuriku Shinkansen; ■ Takayama Main Line; Ainokaze Toyama Railway Line; Toyama Chiho Railway Main Line, Tateyama Line, Fujikoshi-Kamidaki Line (3 lines at Dentetsu-Toyama); Toyama City Tram Line; Toyama Light Rail Toyamako Line

History
- Opened: 20 March 1899; 127 years ago

Services
Preceding station	JR West	Following station
Kanazawa towards Tsuruga	Hokuriku Shinkansen Kagayaki	Nagano Terminus
Shin-Takaoka towards Tsuruga	Hokuriku Shinkansen Hakutaka	Kurobe-Unazukionsen towards Jōetsumyōkō
Shin-Takaoka towards Tsuruga	Hokuriku Shinkansen Tsurugi	Terminus
Location
- Location within Toyama Prefecture Location within Japan

Toyama Station (富山駅, Toyama-eki) is a major railway station and multi-modal transport hub in Toyama, Toyama Prefecture, Japan.

Toyama Station, operated by West Japan Railway Company (JR West) and Ainokaze Toyama Railway, provides Shinkansen, Limited Express and local rail services.

Dentetsu-Toyama Station (電鉄富山駅, Dentetsu-Toyama-eki), on the eastern side of Toyama Station and operated by Toyama Chihō Railway, provides local and regional rail services.

Tram & light rail services, operated by Toyama Chihō Railway, depart from the western side of the Toyama Station building underneath its elevated railway tracks.

Local and long distance bus services operate from both the north and south sides of Toyama Station, with a bus information and ticket office located outside the south exit of Toyama Station. Taxis are also available from the north and south sides of the station.

== Lines ==
Toyama Station is served by the following lines:

- JR West
  - Hokuriku Shinkansen (Tokyo to Tsuruga)
  - Takayama Main Line (to Takayama & Gifu, including Hida Limited Express operated by JR Central)
- Ainokaze Toyama Railway
  - Ainokaze Toyama Railway Line (Kurikara to Ichiburi)
- Toyama Chihō Railway
  - Toyama City Tram Line (to Minami-Toyama, Toyama-daigaku-mae (University of Toyama & City Loop Line)
  - Toyama-Kō Line ("Portram'" light rail line to Iwasehama)

Dentetsu-Toyama Station, on the eastern side of Toyama Station, is served by the following lines:

- Toyama Chihō Railway
  - Main Line (to Unazuki Onsen)
  - Tateyama Line (to Tateyama)
  - Fujikoshi-Kamitaki Line (the Fujikoshi Line and Kamidaki Line operate as a combined service: Dentetsu-Toyama — Minami-Toyama — Iwakuraji).

Dentetsu-Toyama station is the starting point of the Tateyama Kurobe Alpine Route to Mount Tate (Tateyama), and Kurobe Dam.

== Station layout ==
JR West operates a "Midori no Madoguchi" staffed ticket office.

There are two platform entrances/ticket gates at Toyama Station:

- Shinkansen entrance
- Ainokaze Toyama Railway entrance. This entrance is also used to access JR Takayama Main Line & Hida Limited Express services (there are no automatic ticket gates, tickets need to be shown to the ticket gate attendant).

There is also a transfer gate between the Shinkansen and local lines, located on the mezzanine level of the Shinkansen entrance/exit.

=== Platforms ===
The departure melody used for the shinkansen platforms was composed by producer Akira Sudo, who was born in Toyama Prefecture. The Hokuriku Shinkansen has 2 platforms serving 4 tracks, the Takayama Main Line/Ainokaze Toyama Railway Line has 2 platforms serving 5 tracks, the Toyama Chiho Railway Main Line at Dentetsu-Toyama Station has 3 platforms serving 4 tracks. The Toyama City Tram Line & Toyamakō Line tram & light rail services at Toyama Station have 2 tracks with 8 platforms (each track has a platform on each side and a north and south platform separated by a pedestrian crossing).

Shinkansen Platforms
Platform No	Line Name	Direction	Notes
11・12	Hokuriku Shinkansen	for Nagano・Tokyo	
13・14	Hokuriku Shinkansen	for Kanazawa and Tsuruga	

Conventional Line Platforms
Platform No	Line Name	Direction	Notes
1	■Ainokaze Toyama Railway Line	for Takaoka・Kanazawa	
2	■JR Takayama Main Line	for Etchū Yatsuo・Takayama	
3	■JR Takayama Main Line	for Etchū Yatsuo・Takayama	Used by Limited Express Hida services to Nagoya
3	■Ainokaze Toyama Railway Line	for Takaoka・Kanazawa	
4・5	■Ainokaze Toyama Railway Line	for Uozu・Tomari・Itoigawa	

Toyama Chiho Railway - Dentetsu-Toyama Station
Platform No	Line Name	Direction	Notes
1 - 4	■Main Line	for Kamiichi Station・Naka-Namerikawa・Dentetsu-Uozu・Dentetsu-Kurobe・Unazuki Onsen	Used by the Limited Express Unazuki on the Main Line
1 - 4	■Tateyama Line	for Iwakuraji・Chigaki・Tateyama	
1 - 4	■Fujikoshi・Kamidaki Line	for Minami-Toyama・Kamidaki・Daisenji	

Toyama Chiho Railway - Toyama City Tram Line - Toyamaeki
Platform No	Line Name	Direction
1	Toyama City Tram Line	■ for Minami-Toyama Station
2	Toyama City Tram Line	Used for Alighting only
3	Toyama City Tram Line	■ Loop Line
4	Toyama City Tram Line	■ for Toyama Daigakumae
5	■ Toyama Light Rail Toyamako Line	■ for Iwasehama
6・7	■ Toyama Light Rail Toyamako Line	Used for Alighting only
8	■ Toyama Light Rail Toyamako Line	■ for Iwasehama

== Adjacent stations ==
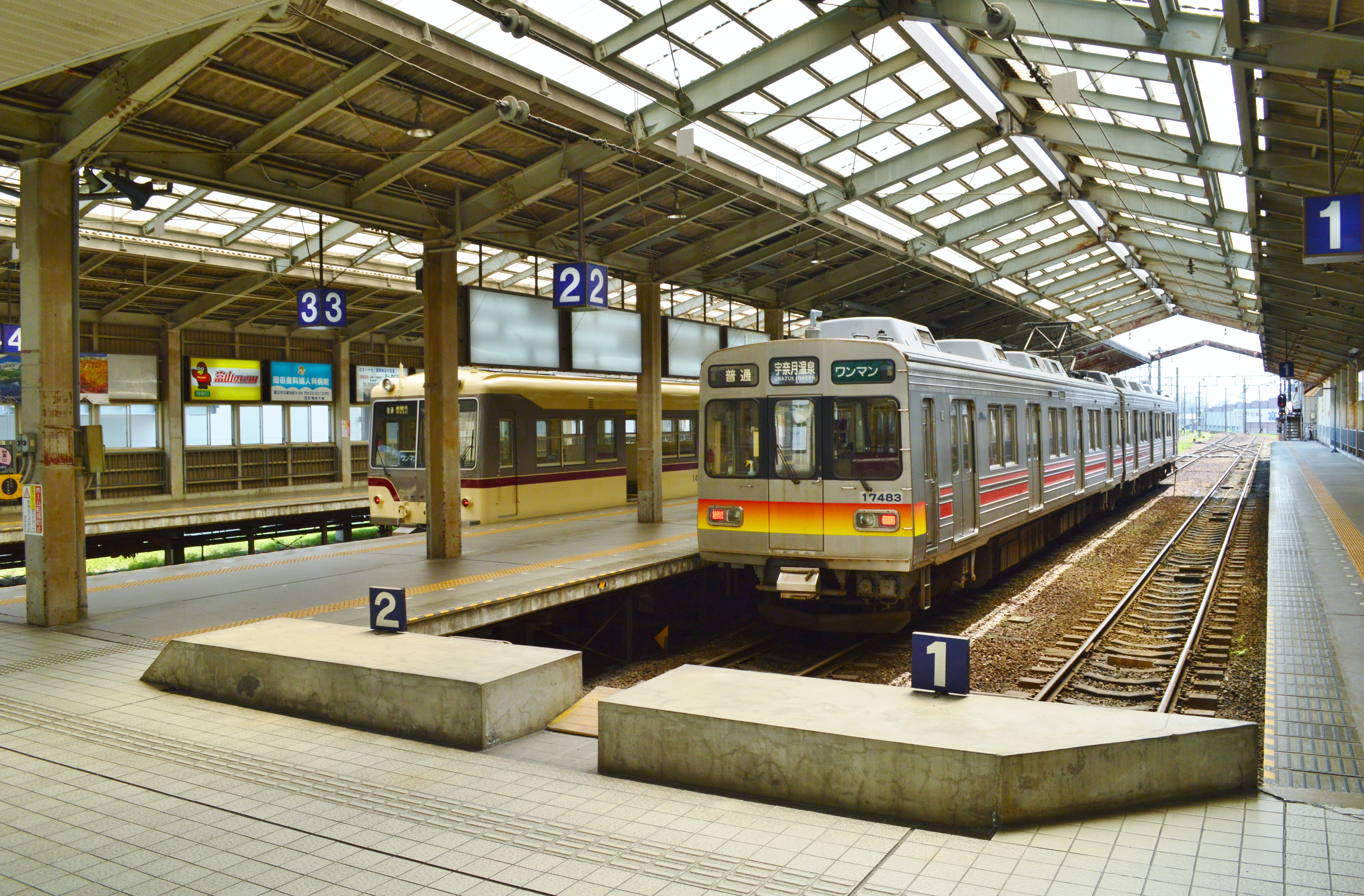
Dentetsu-Toyama Station

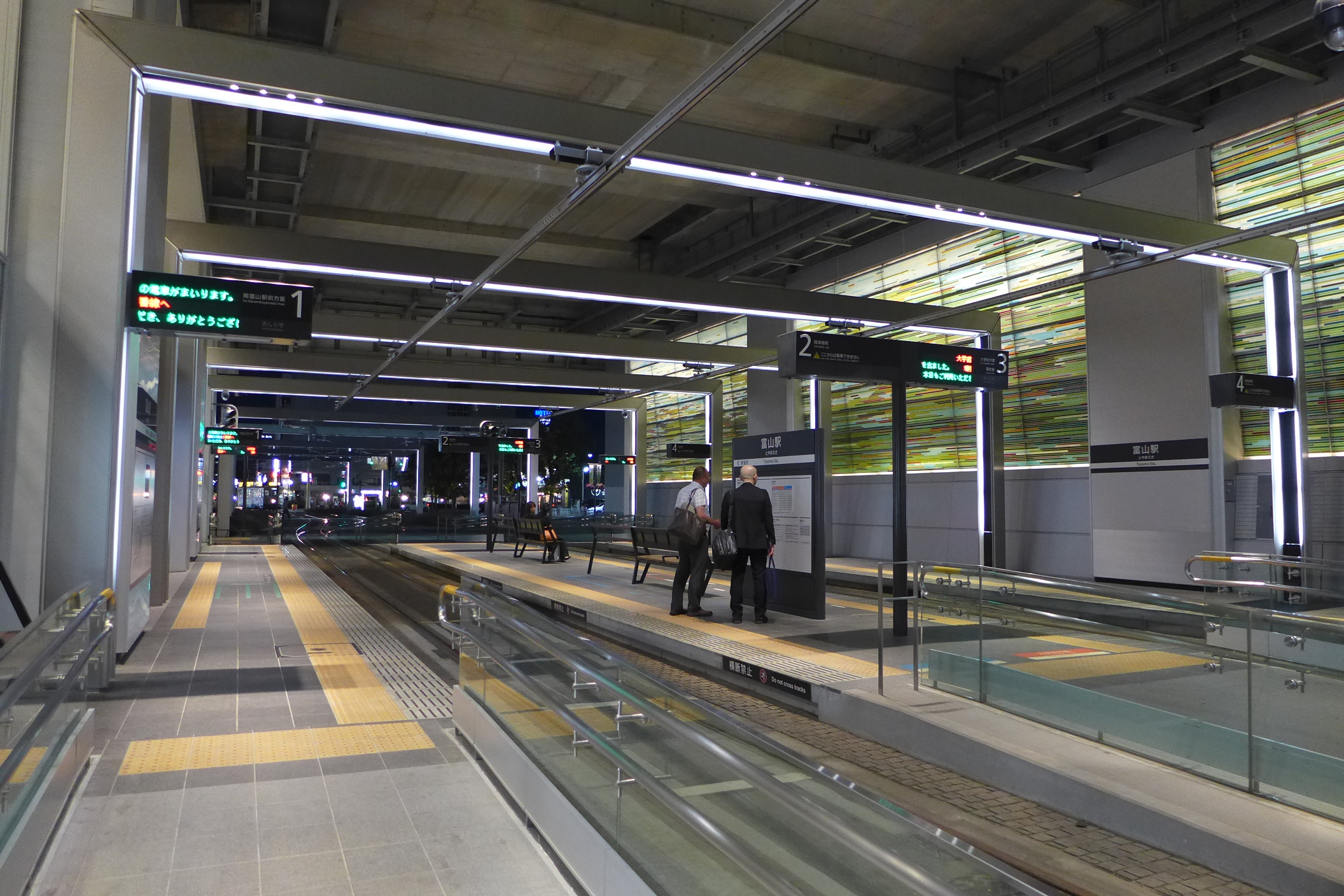
Toyama Station

«	Service	»
Takayama Main Line
Nishi-Toyama	Local	Terminus
Hayahoshi or Etchu-Yatsuo	Limited Express Hida	Terminus
Ainokaze Toyama Railway Line
Kureha	Local	Shin-Toyamaguchi
Toyama Chihō Railway Main Line
Terminus	Local	Inarimachi
Terminus	Express	Inarimachi
Terminus	Rapid Express	Inarimachi
Terminus	Limited Express Unazuki	Terada

== History ==
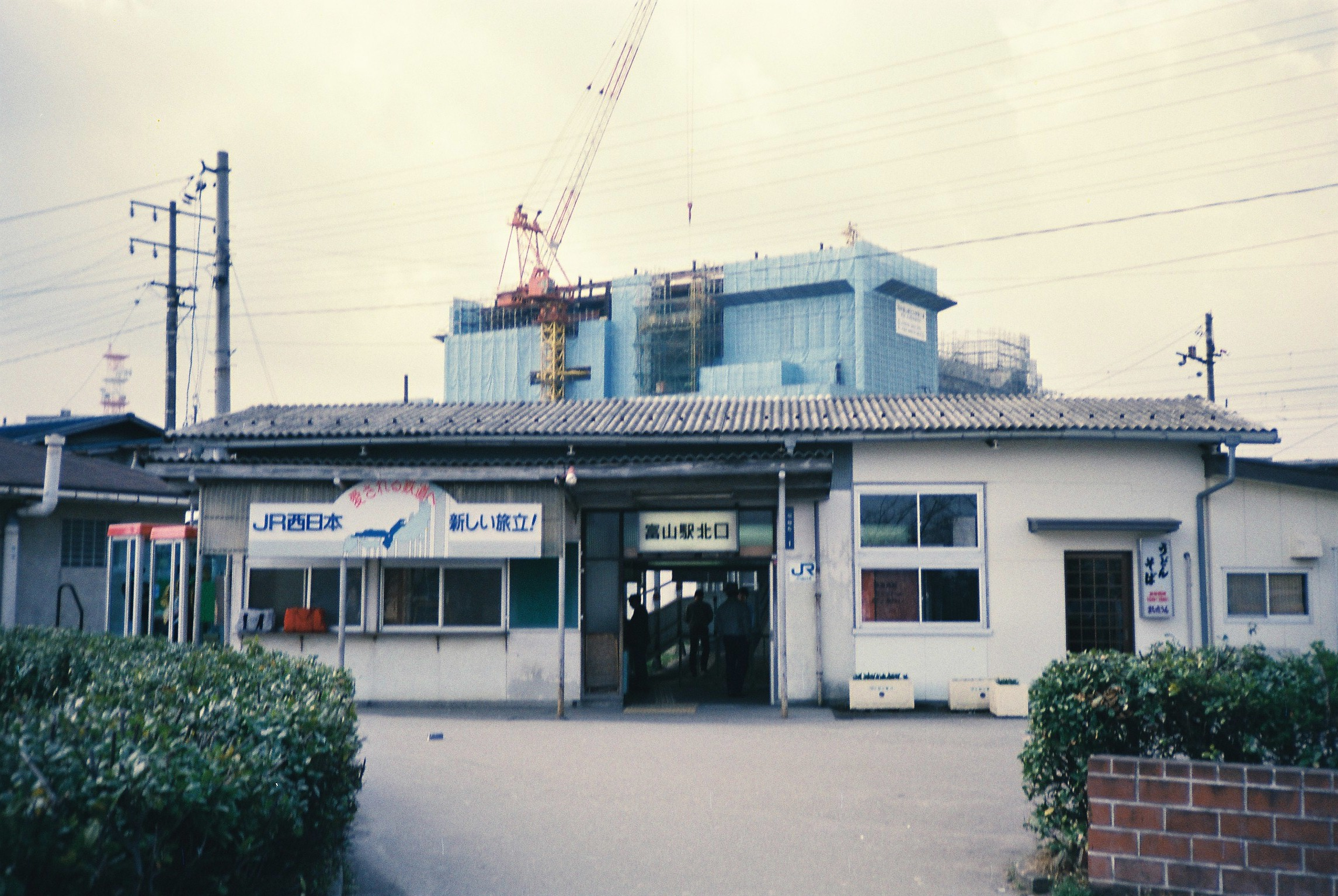
The north entrance in April 1987

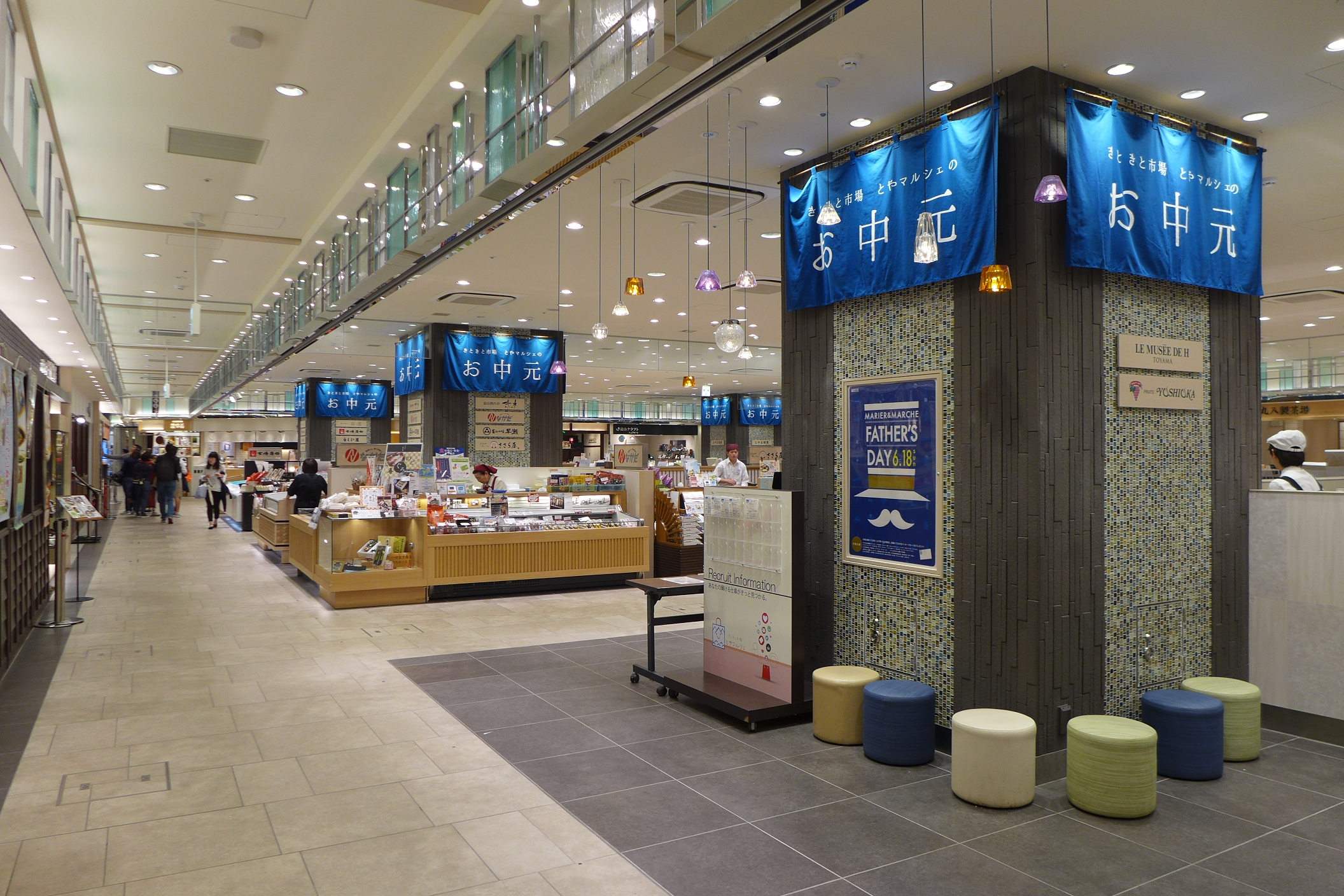
Toyama Station shops

Toyama Station opened on 20 March 1899. With the privatization of JNR on 1 April 1987, the station came under the control of JR West.

From 14 March 2015, the station was served by the high-speed Hokuriku Shinkansen following the opening of the extension from Nagano to Kanazawa, providing direct services between Tokyo and Kanazawa. On the same day, services on the JR West Hokuriku Main Line within Toyama Prefecture were transferred to the new third-sector railway operator Ainokaze Toyama Railway.

From March 21, 2020, with the completion of the north-south tram link across Toyama Railway Station, Toyama City Tram services operate a through service to the Toyamakō Line light rail line.

On 16 March 2024, the Hokuriku Shinkansen extension from Kanazawa to Fukui and Tsuruga was opened.

== Surrounding area ==
=== Kitaguchi entrance (north side) ===
- Canal Park

=== Minamiguchi entrance (south side) ===
- Toyama Castle
- Museum of Modern Art, Toyama
- Toyama International Conference Center
- Koshino Bungakukan/Toyama Museum of Literature and Manga

== See also ==
- List of railway stations in Japan
- Tateyama Station (Toyama)
