= Toyama Chihō Railway Fujikoshi Line =

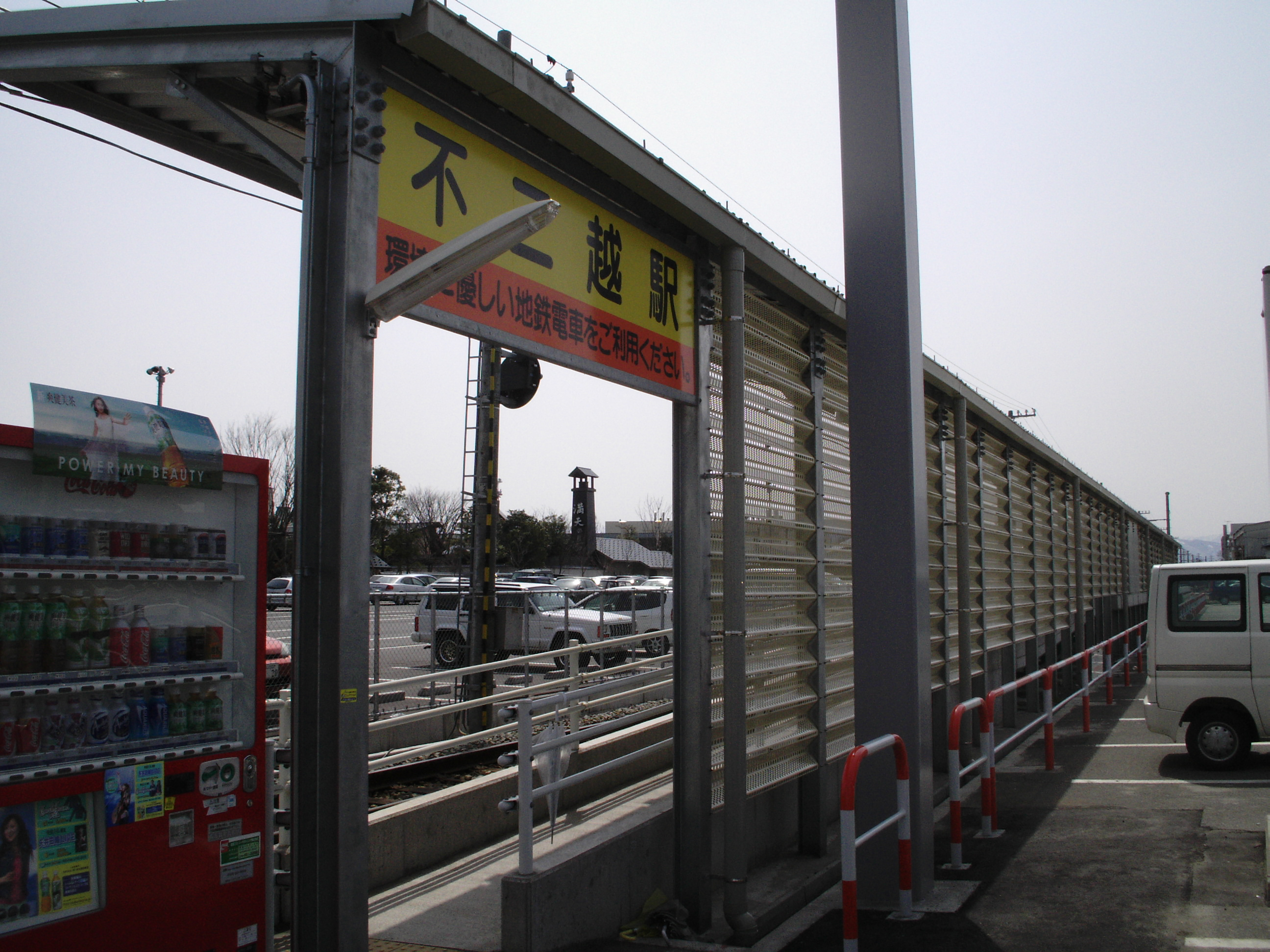
Toyama Chihō Railway Fujikoshi Line

The Fujikoshi Line (不二越線, Fujikoshi-sen) is a Japanese railway line which connects Inarimachi Station with Minami-Toyama Station, all within Toyama, Toyama Prefecture. It is owned and run by Toyama Chihō Railway. This line and the Toyama Chihō Railway Kamidaki Line (Minami-Toyama Station to Iwakuraji Station in Tateyama) are operated together as a single line which is named Fujikoshi-Kamidaki Line.

== Services ==
All services on the Line are Local trains, stopping at every station.

All services operate a through service from Dentetsu Toyama Station on the Toyama Chihō Railway Main Line onto the Fujikoshi Line to Minami-Toyama, then onto the Kamidaki Line to Iwakuraji.

Trains operate approximately every 30 minutes during morning and evening peak hours and every 60 minutes at other times. Running time from Dentetsu-Toyama to Minami-Toyama is 12 minutes and to Iwakuraji is 36-39 minutes.

== Station list ==
All stations are located within Toyama Prefecture

Line	No.	Name		Distance between stations (km)	Distance within line (km)	Connections	Location
Toyama Chihō Railway Main Line	T01	Dentetsu-Toyama	電鉄富山	0.0	-1.6	Hokuriku Shinkansen (Toyama Station) Takayama Main Line (Toyama Station) Ainokaze Toyama Railway Line (Toyama Station) Toyama Chihō Railway: Toyama City Tram Line & Toyamakō Line light rail (Toyama Station)	Toyama
Toyama Chihō Railway Main Line	T02	Inarimachi	稲荷町	1.6	0.0	Toyama Chihō Railway Main Line	Toyama
Fujikoshi Line	T02	Inarimachi	稲荷町	0.0	0.0	Toyama Chihō Railway Main Line	Toyama
Fujikoshi Line	T58	Sakaemachi	栄町	0.6	0.6		Toyama
Fujikoshi Line	T59	Fujikoshi	不二越	0.4	1.0		Toyama
Fujikoshi Line	T60	Ōizumi	大泉	1.2	2.2		Toyama
Fujikoshi Line	T61	Minami-Toyama	南富山	1.1	3.3	Toyama City Tram Line (Minami-Toyama Ekimae)	Toyama
Kamidaki Line	T61	Minami-Toyama	南富山	0.0	0.0	Toyama City Tram Line (Minami-Toyama Ekimae)	Toyama
Kamidaki Line	T62	Asanamachi	朝菜町	1.3	1.3		Toyama
Kamidaki Line	T63	Kamihori	上堀	0.8	2.1		Toyama
Kamidaki Line	T64	Kosugi	小杉	0.6	2.7		Toyama
Kamidaki Line	T65	Nunoichi	布市	0.5	3.2		Toyama
Kamidaki Line	T66	Kaihotsu	開発	1.2	4.4		Toyama
Kamidaki Line	T67	Tsukioka	月岡	2.2	6.6		Toyama
Kamidaki Line	T68	Ōshō	大庄	1.3	7.9		Toyama
Kamidaki Line	T69	Kamidaki	上滝	2.2	10.1		Toyama
Kamidaki Line	T70	Daisenji	大川寺	1.1	11.2		Toyama
Kamidaki Line	T51	Iwakuraji	岩峅寺	1.2	12.4	Toyama Chihō Railway Tateyama Line	Tateyama

== History ==
The Toyama Light Railway Co. opened the Toyama - Sasazu (since closed) line in 1914. The company merged with the Toyama Electric Railway Co. in 1941, and the Inarimachi - Minami-Toyama section was electrified at 1500 VDC two years later when the current company was formed by a merger of all non-government owned railways in the Toyama area.

=== Former connecting lines ===
- Minami-Toyama station - the 12km line to Sasazu on the Takayama Line opened in 1914 and was electrified at 600 VDC in 1943 as it also connected to the Toyama City Tram Line. The line closed in 1975.

== See also ==
- List of railway lines in Japan
