= Ōshō Station =

Railway station in Toyama, Toyama Prefecture, Japan

Ōshō Station 大庄駅
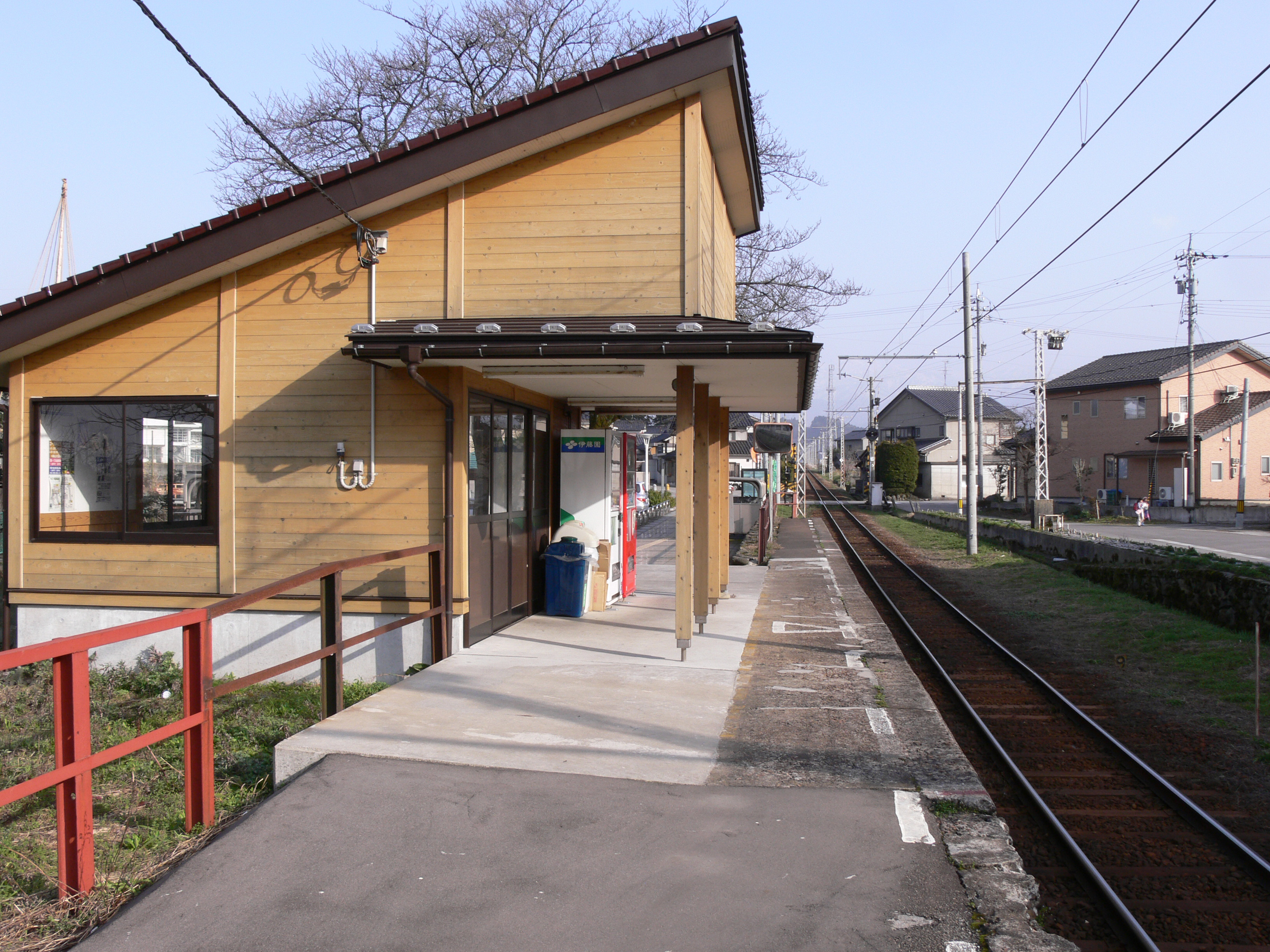
- Ōshō Station in March 2009

General information
- Location: 131 Minamioba, Toyama-shi Toyama-ken 930-1304; Japan
- Coordinates: 36.6193°N 137.2758°E
- Operator: Toyama Chihō Railway
- Line: ■ Kamidaki Line
- Distance: 7.9 km from Minami-Toyama
- Platforms: 1 side platform
- Tracks: 1

Other information
- Status: Unstaffed
- Website: Official website

History
- Opened: 25 April 1921

Passengers
- FY2015: 110 daily
Location
- Location within Japan

Ōshō Station (大庄駅, Ōshō-eki) is a railway station on the Toyama Chihō Railway Kamidaki Line in the city of Toyama, Toyama Prefecture, Japan, operated by the private railway operator Toyama Chihō Railway.

== Lines ==
Ōshō Station is served by the Toyama Chihō Railway Kamidaki Line, and is 7.9 kilometers from the starting point of the line at Minami-Toyama.

== Station layout ==
The station has one ground-level side platform serving a single bi-directional track. The station is unattended.

== Adjacent stations ==
«	Service	»
Toyama Chihō Railway Kamidaki Line
Tsukioka	-	Kamidaki

== History ==
Ōshō Station opened on 25 April 1921.

== Surrounding area ==
- Ōshō Elementary School
- Toyama University of International Studies

== See also ==
- List of railway stations in Japan
