= Inarimachi Station (Toyama) =

Railway station in Toyama, Toyama Prefecture, Japan

Inarimachi Station 稲荷町駅
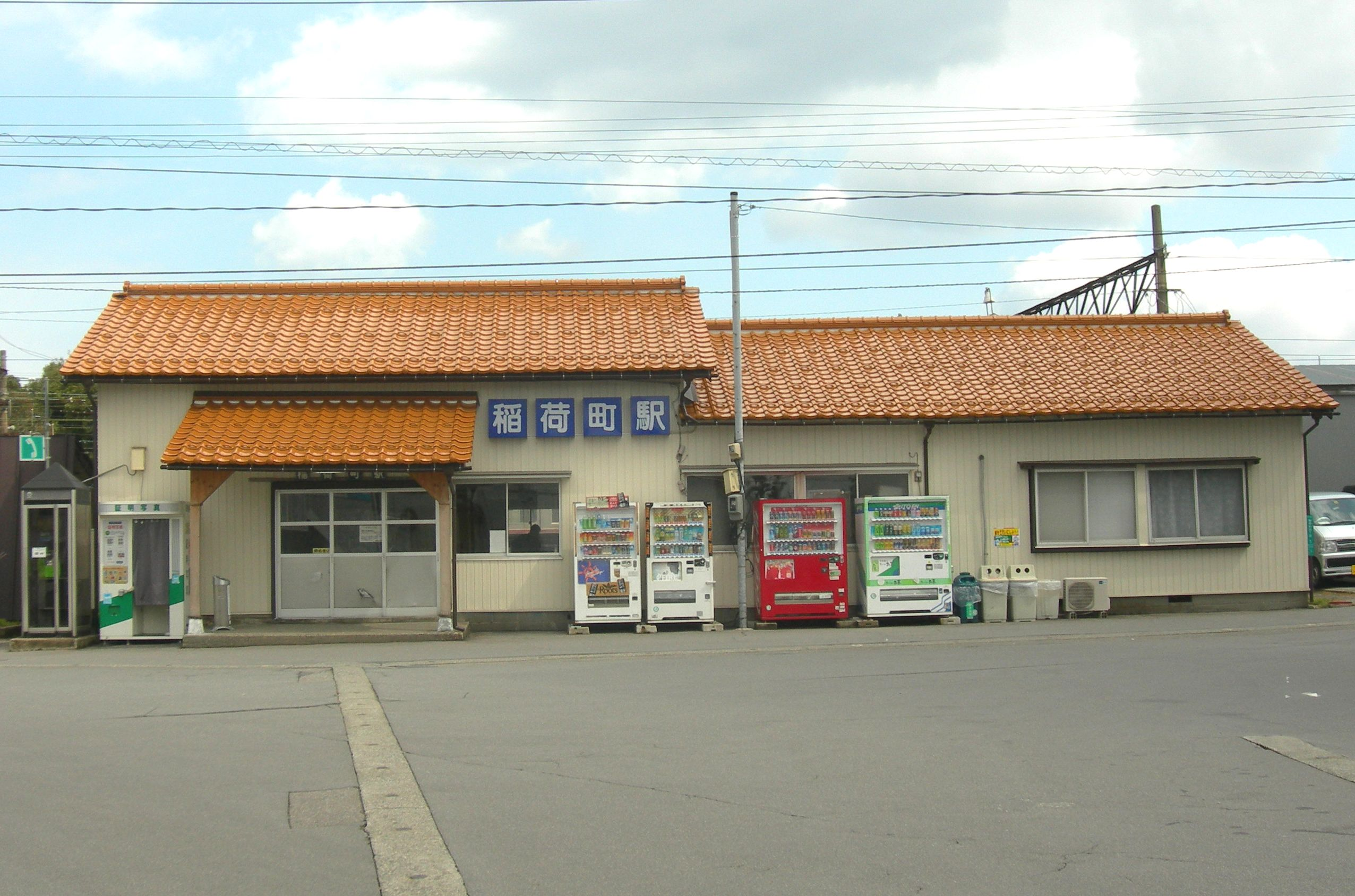
- Inarimachi Station in March 2009

General information
- Location: 4-1-73 Inarimachi, Toyama-shi, Toyama-ken 930-0012; Japan
- Coordinates: 36.6968°N 137.2316°E
- Operator: Toyama Chihō Railway
- Lines: ■ Toyama Chihō Railway Main Line; ■ Toyama Chihō Railway Fujikoshi Line
- Distance: 1.6 km from Dentetsu-Toyama
- Platforms: 3 side platforms
- Tracks: 3

Other information
- Status: Staffed
- Website: Official website

History
- Opened: 6 December 1914

Passengers
- FY2015: 1141
Location
- Location within Japan

Inarimachi Station (稲荷町駅, Inarimachi-eki) is a train station in the city of Toyama, Toyama Prefecture, Japan operated by the Toyama Chihō Railway.

== Lines ==
Inarimachi Station is served by the Toyama Chihō Railway Main Line, and is 1.6 kilometers from the starting point of the line at Dentetsu-Toyama. It is also a terminal station for the Toyama Chihō Railway Fujikoshi Line

== Station layout ==
The station has two opposed ground-level side platforms and one single side platform serving three tracks, connected by a level crossing. The platforms are not sequentially numbered. The station is staffed.

=== Platforms ===
3	■ Toyama Chihō Railway Fujikoshi Line	for Minami-Toyama and Daisenji
1	■ Toyama Chihō Railway Main Line	for Dentetsu Toyama
2	■ Toyama Chihō Railway Main Line	for Kamiichi, Dentetsu-Uozu and Unazuki-Onsen

== History ==
Inarimachi Station was opened on 6 December 1914.

== Passenger statistics ==
In fiscal 2015, the station was used by 1141 passengers daily.

== Adjacent stations ==
«	Service	»
Toyama Chihō Railway Main Line
Limited Express: Does not stop at this station
Dentetsu-Toyama	Rapid Express	Terada
Dentetsu-Toyama	Express	Shinjō-Tanaka
Dentetsu-Toyama	Local	Shinjō-Tanaka
Toyama Chihō Railway Fujikoshi Line
Terminus	-	Sakaemachi

== Surrounding area ==
- Japan National Route 41

== See also ==
- List of railway stations in Japan
