= Toyama Chihō Railway Kamidaki Line =

Railway line in Toyama prefecture, Japan

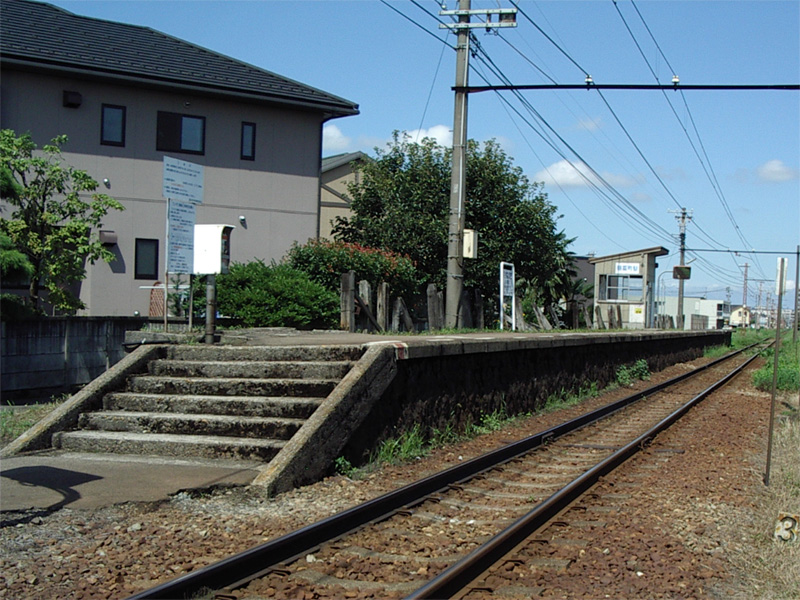
Asanamachi Station

The Kamidaki Line (上滝線, Kamidaki-sen) is a Japanese railway line which connects Minami-Toyama Station in Toyama, Toyama Prefecture with Iwakuraji Station in Tateyama, Toyama Prefecture. It is owned and run by Toyama Chihō Railway. This line and the Toyama Chihō Railway Fujikoshi Line are operated as a single line.

== History ==
The Toyama Prefectural Government opened the line in 1921, electrifying it at 600 VDC in 1927 and raising the voltage to 1500 VDC in 1937 to match the electrification on the Toyama Chihō Railway Tateyama Line.

The line was merged into the Toyama Chihō Railway Co. upon its creation in 1943.

=== Former connecting lines ===
- Minami-Toyama station - the 12km line to Sasazu on the Takayama Line opened in 1914 and was electrified at 600 VDC in 1943 as it also connected to the Toyama City Tram Line. The line closed in 1975.

== Station list ==
| No. | Name | | Distance between stations (km) | Total Distance (km) | Connections | Location | |
|---|---|---|---|---|---|---|---|
| T61 | Minami-Toyama | 南富山 | 0.0 | 0.0 | Toyama Chihō Railway Fujikoshi Line; Toyama City Tram Line (Minami-Toyama Ekimae) | Toyama | Toyama |
| T62 | Asanamachi | 朝菜町 | 1.3 | 1.3 | | Toyama | Toyama |
| T63 | Kamihori | 上堀 | 0.8 | 2.1 | | Toyama | Toyama |
| T64 | Kosugi | 小杉 | 0.6 | 2.7 | | Toyama | Toyama |
| T65 | Nunoichi | 布市 | 0.5 | 3.2 | | Toyama | Toyama |
| T66 | Kaihotsu | 開発 | 1.2 | 4.4 | | Toyama | Toyama |
| T67 | Tsukioka | 月岡 | 2.2 | 6.6 | | Toyama | Toyama |
| T68 | Ōshō | 大庄 | 1.3 | 7.9 | | Toyama | Toyama |
| T69 | Kamidaki | 上滝 | 2.2 | 10.1 | | Toyama | Toyama |
| T70 | Daisenji | 大川寺 | 1.1 | 11.2 | | Toyama | Toyama |
| T51 | Iwakuraji | 岩峅寺 | 1.2 | 12.4 | Toyama Chihō Railway Tateyama Line | Tateyama | Toyama |

== See also ==
- List of railway lines in Japan
