= Shinjō-Tanaka Station =

Railway station in Toyama, Toyama Prefecture, Japan

Shinjō-Tanaka Station 新庄田中駅
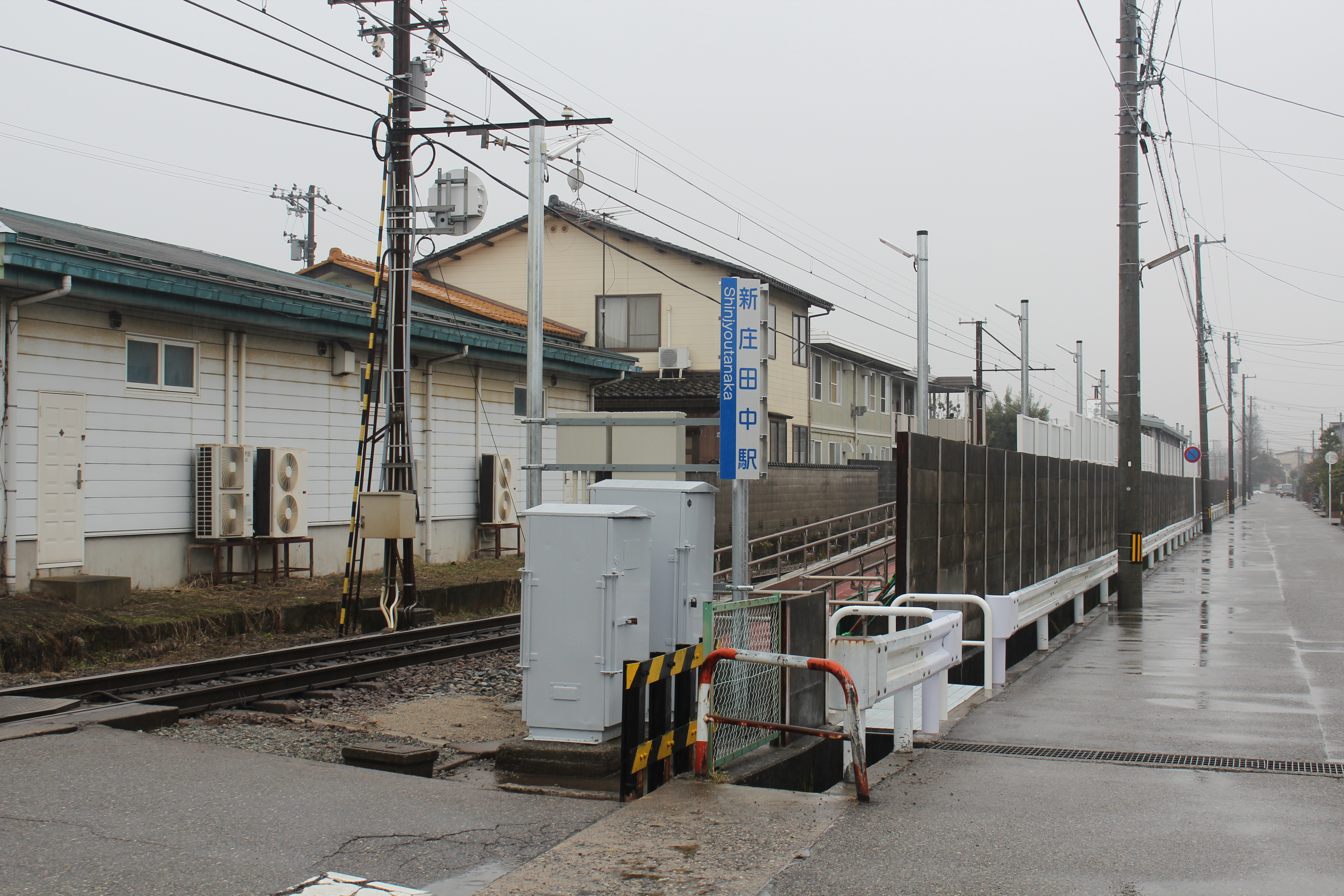
- Shinjō-Tanaka Station in December 2012

General information
- Location: 4-96-6 Tanaka, Toyama-shi, Toyama-ken 930-0985; Japan
- Coordinates: 36°41′52.7″N 137°14′29.1″E
- Operator: Toyama Chihō Railway
- Line: ■ Toyama Chihō Railway Main Line
- Distance: 2.5 km from Dentetsu-Toyama
- Platforms: 1 side platforms
- Tracks: 1

Other information
- Status: Unstaffed
- Website: Official website

History
- Opened: 21 December 2012

Passengers
- FY2015: 136
Location
- Location within Japan

Shinjō-Tanaka Station (新庄田中駅, Shinjō-Tanaka-eki) is a train station in the city of Toyama, Toyama Prefecture, Japan.

== Lines ==
Shinjō-Tanaka Station is served by the Toyama Chihō Railway Main Line, and is 2.5 kilometres (1.6 miles) from the starting point of the line at Dentetsu-Toyama.

== Station layout ==
The station has one ground-level side platform serving a single bi-directional track. The station is unattended

== History ==
Shinjō-Tanaka Station was opened on 21 December 2012.

== Passenger statistics ==
In fiscal 2015, the station was used by 136 passengers daily.

== Adjacent stations ==
«	Service	»
Toyama Chihō Railway Main Line
Limited Express: Does not stop at this station
Rapid Express: Does not stop at this station
Express: Does not stop at this station
Inarimachi	Local	Higashi-Shinjō

== Surrounding area ==
- Japan National Route 41

== See also ==
- List of railway stations in Japan
