= Toyama College =

Coordinates: 36°43′16.9″N 137°8′23.6″E

Toyama College (富山短期大学, Toyama tanki daigaku) is a private junior college in Toyama, Toyama, Japan. It is attached to the Kureha Campus of Toyama University of International Studies. The school was founded as a women's junior college called Toyama Women's College in 1963. In 2000 it became coeducational.

== See also ==
- Toyama National College of Technology
- Toyama National College of Maritime Technology
