= Nunoichi Station =

Railway station in Toyama, Toyama Prefecture, Japan

Nunoichi Station 布市駅
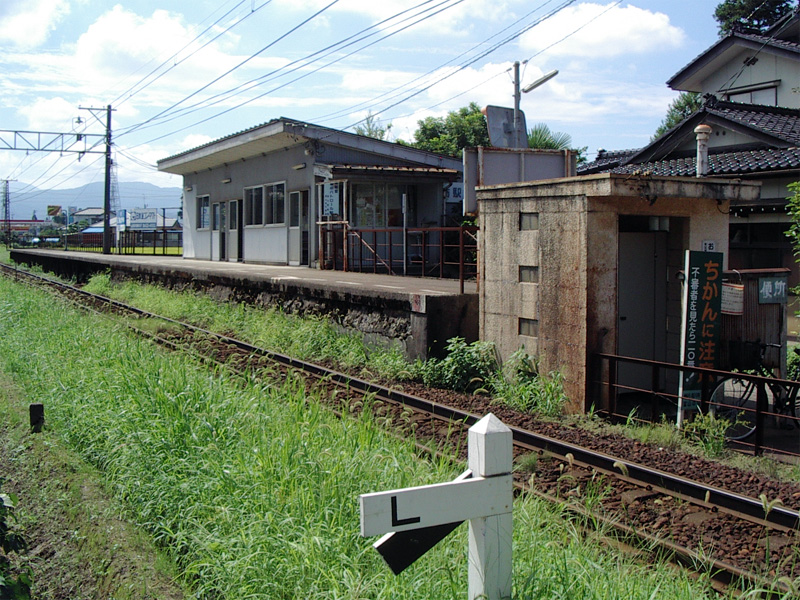
- Nunoichi Station in August 2008

General information
- Location: 774 Nunoichi, Toyama-shi Toyama-ken 939-8063; Japan
- Coordinates: 36.6453°N 137.2354°E
- Operator: Toyama Chihō Railway
- Line: ■ Kamidaki Line
- Distance: 3.2 km from Minami-Toyama
- Platforms: 1 side platform
- Tracks: 1

Other information
- Status: Unstaffed
- Website: Official website

History
- Opened: 25 April 1921
Location
- Location within Japan

Nunoichi Station (布市駅, Nunoichi-eki) is a railway station on the Toyama Chihō Railway Kamidaki Line in the city of Toyama, Toyama Prefecture, Japan, operated by the private railway operator Toyama Chihō Railway.

== Lines ==
Nunoichi Station is served by the Toyama Chihō Railway Kamidaki Line, and is 3.2 kilometers from the starting point of the line at Minami-Toyama.

== Station layout ==
The station has one ground-level side platform serving a single bi-directional track. The station is unattended.

== Adjacent stations ==
«	Service	»
Toyama Chihō Railway Kamidaki Line
Kosugi	-	Kaihotsu

== History ==
Nunoichi Station opened on 25 April 1921.

== Surrounding area ==
- Toyama Minami High School

== See also ==
- List of railway stations in Japan
