= Tsukioka Station (Toyama) =

Railway station in Toyama, Toyama Prefecture, Japan

Tsukioka Station 月岡駅
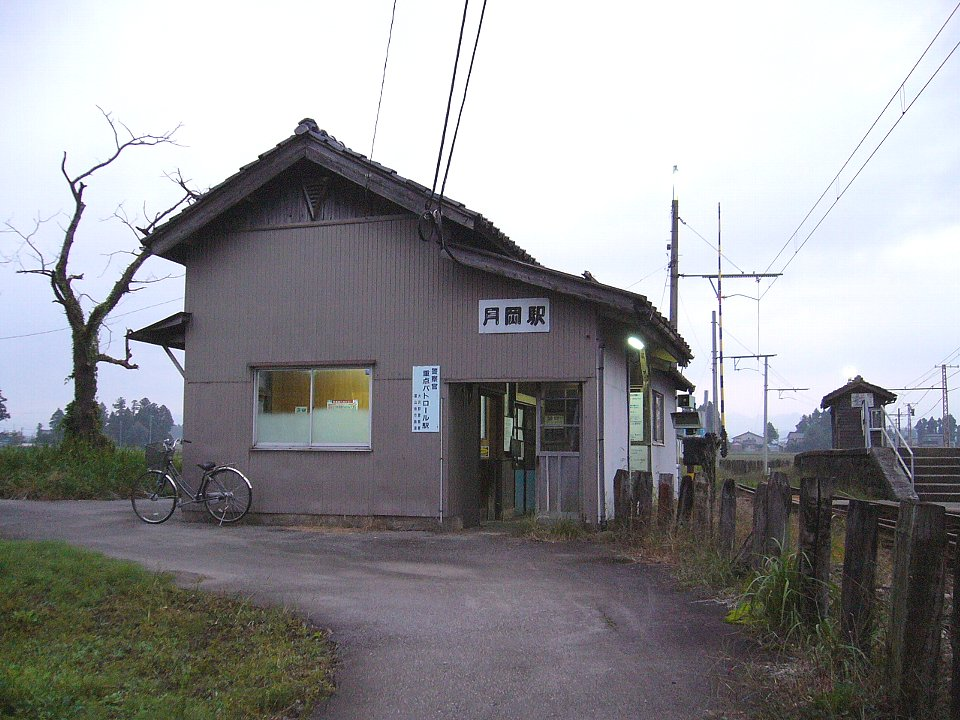
- Tsukioka Station in September 2008

General information
- Location: 2-282 Tsukioka, Toyama-shi Toyama-ken 939-8132; Japan
- Coordinates: 36.6266°N 137.2635°E
- Operator: Toyama Chihō Railway
- Line: ■ Kamidaki Line
- Distance: 6.6 km from Minami-Toyama
- Platforms: 1 island platform
- Tracks: 2

Other information
- Status: Unstaffed
- Website: Official website

History
- Opened: 25 April 1921

Passengers
- FY2015: 65 daily
Location
- Location within Japan

Tsukioka Station (月岡駅, Tsukioka-eki) is a railway station on the Toyama Chihō Railway Kamidaki Line in the city of Toyama, Toyama Prefecture, Japan, operated by the private railway operator Toyama Chihō Railway.

== Lines ==
Tsukioka Station is served by the Toyama Chihō Railway Kamidaki Line, and is 6.6 kilometers from the starting point of the line at Minami-Toyama. The line runs between Minami-Toyama and Iwakujira stations.

== Services ==
As of July 2025, services run between 5:53 AM local time, and 10:23 PM local time for the Minami-Toyama/Dentetsu-Toyama service, and 10:50 PM local time for the Iwakuraji service. 25 trains run daily in each direction.

In 2023, an average of 95 passengers per day boarded trains at Tsukioka station.

== Station layout ==
The station has one ground-level island platform connected to the station building by a level crossing. The station is unattended.

== Adjacent stations ==
«	Service	»
Toyama Chihō Railway Kamidaki Line
Kaihotsu	-	Ōshō

== History ==
Tsukioka Station opened on 25 April 1921. At the time the area surrounding the station was not built up as a town, so it was intended to serve local farmers in the surrounding area. For this reason, it is surrounded by rice fields to this day.

== In culture ==
Tsukioka station appeared as a setting in the 2011 movie Crossroads ( Japanese title - RAILWAYS 愛を伝えられない大人たちへ)

== Surrounding area ==
- Toyama Tsukioka Junior High School

== See also ==
- List of railway stations in Japan
