= Toyama Shogyo High School =

High school in Toyama City, Japan

Coordinates: 36°41′21.64″N 137°11′12.77″E

Toyama Shogyo High School (富山県立富山商業高等学校) is a commercial high school located in Toyama City, the capital of Toyama Prefecture, Japan. The school has been in operation for more than a century and, with only brief interruptions in operation, has survived war with China, Russia, and the United States of America, and has seen the reign of the Meiji, Taisho, Showa, and Heisei Emperors. The school has several notable graduates and is a regular favorite in local and national sports competitions.

== Region ==
Toyama Shogyo is located in Toyama City. Toyama City is the capital of Toyama Prefecture, which is in the Hokuriku area of the Chubu region on Honshu, Japan's largest island. The school can be reached via tram from Toyama station, which is served by JR’s Takayama, Takaoka, and Hokuriku lines, as well as various express trains for those coming from farther-abroad. The school is located near the Shin-Toyama stop on the Toyama city tram line, as well as the Toyama-Kyujomae bus stop. It is a slightly farther walk from JR's Nishi-Toyama station, which is located on the Takayama line. Toyama Shogyo is bordered by Toyama University’s department of engineering, the Toyama Prefectural General Education Center, and the Furu River. Saino Hospital is also in the immediate neighborhood of the school.

== Philosophy ==
As a commercial high school, Toyama Shogyo's educational philosophy differs somewhat from that of university track high schools whose aim is primarily to prepare students for university entrance examinations. The school precepts are voluntary cooperation, cheerful integrity, and an enterprising spirit. The educational aim is to develop high ability in the field of commerce, as well as developing the qualities of love, justice, and strength of character in students. Toyama Shogyo's education policy is as follows:

== Courses of Study ==
Toyama Shogyo has four courses of study that students may enroll in. Each track is intended to prepare students for a career or further education (such as technical or vocational school) through the development of practical skills. The four tracks and a brief summary of each follow.

=== Information Processing Department ===
Information Processing students learn information processing and bookkeeping techniques. The course is divided into two sections beginning in the second year based on the goals of the students. By the time they graduate, students should be able to pass either the first level of the Information Processing Practice Proficiency Test or the first level of the Bookkeeping Practice Proficiency Test conducted by the National Association of Commercial High Schools.

=== Accounting Department ===
Accounting students learn bookkeeping and accounting techniques. The goal of the course is to teach students to deal with accounting information appropriately. By the time they graduate, students should be able to pass either the first level Bookkeeping Practice Proficiency Test conducted by the National Association of Commercial High Schools or the second level Bookkeeping Proficiency Test conducted by the Japanese Chamber of Commerce and Industry.

=== International Economics Department ===
This course was designed to teach students how to communicate as a citizen of the world and to effectively facilitate international exchange. By the time they graduate, students should be able to pass the first level English Proficiency Test and the first level Bookkeeping Practice Proficiency Test conducted by the National Association of Commercial High Schools.

=== Circulation Economics Department ===
The goal of this course is to help students become proficient in marketing and promotional techniques. Beginning in their second year, students participate in internships with local department stores. By the time they graduate, students should be able to pass the second level of the Sales Proficiency Test conducted by the Japanese Chamber of Commerce and Industry.

== History ==
April 9, 1898 – founded under the name “Toyama Basic Commercial High School”

September 22, 1898 – School opening ceremony

April 1, 1900 – name was changed to “Toyama Commercial High School”

October 1, 1901 – moved to Nakano shinmachi (shinchou)

June 1, 1902 – renamed “Toyama City Commercial High School”

April 1, 1922 – renamed “Toyama Prefectural Commercial School”

September 1, 1923 – relocated to a new building in Toyama City's Gofuku district

April 1, 1944 – Toyama Prefecture's second technical school opened

August 1, 1945 – Toyama Prefectural Commercial High School was destroyed in the American air raid on Toyama City

March 31, 1946 – the prefecture's second technical school was closed

April 1, 1947 –Toyama Prefectural Commercial High School resumed operation in a new building constructed in Toyama City's Gofuku district

April 1, 1948 – renamed “Toyama Prefectural Commercial High School”

April 1, 1950 – East Toyama Prefectural High School split from Toyama Prefectural Commercial High School. The courses of study offered were in business and home economics

March 2, 1956 – the home economics course of study was discontinued January 13, 1969 – the school stopped accepting part-time students

March 31, 1970 – the commercial course of study was discontinued

March 31, 1972 – the part-time course of study was discontinued

October 15, 1981 – construction for the current building began

April 22, 1983 – the school officially transferred to its current address

December 20, 1983 – construction was completed on “Tomisho Hall”

December 6, 1989 – Toyama Shogyo was one of the schools designated for research in The Ministry of Education's “5 day school week trial”

April 1, 1991 – the classroom capacity was declared to be 44 students

April 1, 1992 – the classroom capacity was lowered to 40 students

April 1, 1994 – the accounting, sales, and clerical departments stopped accepting new students. At the same time, the distribution economics, international economics, accounting, and information processing departments were established.

March 31, 1996 – the accounting, sales, and clerical departments ceased operation

September 22, 1997 – Toyama Shogyo celebrated its centennial anniversary

April, 2003 – Toyama Shogyo was one of the schools designated for research in the Toyama Prefectural Board of Education's “Research and evaluation system for the establishment of schools.” It was also one of the designated research schools in The Ministry of Education's “Business frontier high school academic development” project.

September 22, 2007 – a ceremony was held to celebrate the 100th anniversary of Toyama Shogyo's founding

April 1, 2008 – the number of students accepted into the accounting course of study was lowered

April 1, 2010 – the accounting class acceptance returned to its original size

== Symbols ==
Toyama Shogyo's school symbol is an 8 pointed star, with each of the eight points representing one of the virtues the school wishes to establish in its students. These properties are love of peace, trust, honesty, justice, love for our fellow man, health, responsibility, and integrity. The symbol has been changed four times since the school's founding. While Toyama Shogyo has no official school mascot, it does have a mascot for the school's biggest event of the year, Tomishop. During Tomishop, the students are given practical experience in stocking, sales, customer support, and advertising by converting the school into a marketplace for one weekend. A round-faced cat named “Tominyan” is the mascot of Tomishop, and is often featured prominently on advertisements, flyers, and posters around the school both during Tomishop and in the weeks preceding it. Tominyan has a female counterpart, which is a character nearly identical in appearance to Tominyan himself, except for a bow she wears near her ear and the absence of Tominyan's three black stripes on top of his head.

=== Uniform ===
The boys’ uniform consists of a blue blazer with the school emblem on the left breast, sweater-vest, also with the school emblem, a white dress-shirt, gray slacks, and a blue necktie, also carrying the school emblem. The uniform is worn slightly differently according to the season. During the summer and warmer months, the blazer and sweater-vest are not worn, while during the fall the sweater-vest is worn without the jacket. In addition to the uniform, students have certain other regulations regarding their appearances. Male students wear sneakers or loafers, with black, white, or gray socks. They must wear a black or brown belt, which must be worn at the waist, not sagging or pulled down onto the hips. They must also wear a crew cut or buzz cut.

The upper part of the girls’ uniform is very similar to the boys’ uniform. Girls also wear a blue blazer and/or sweater with the school emblem, a white dress-shirt, and a blue necktie with the school emblem. However, the girls who attend Toyama Shogyo are recognizable by their almost floor-length gray skirts, which are required to extend at least 5 cm below the knee. Female students are instructed to wear simple gloves and scarves on their way to school during the cold months. They must wear athletic shoes or loafers with white socks. During the winter, they may wear black stockings instead of white socks if they so desire. Their hair must either be cut short, or tied back so that it does not fall over the eyes.

Both male and female students at Toyama Shogyo use school bags of approximately the same navy blue color as their blazers bearing the school emblem, as well as the word “Tomisho,” written in English.

== Sports ==
Toyama Shogyo High School's sports teams are regular contenders at regional and national events. The clubs include swimming, sumo, cheerleading, Japanese archery, soccer, volleyball, soft tennis, softball, basketball, gymnastics, judo, badminton, baseball, rubber baseball, track and field, tennis, and table tennis. Toyama Shogyo boasts several athletic championships throughout its history, including a victory at Koushien, Japan's national high school baseball tournament, and participation in the 2005 Japanese national sumo convention. The school's individual athletes have also won numerous awards.

== Clubs ==
As a largely non-university track school, Toyama Shogyo places high emphasis on outstanding performance in extracurricular activities. These clubs include:

Brass band club
Founded in 1940, it holds a concert every summer and regularly participates in the national high school brass bands contest.
Word processing club
Has received honors including first prize in the national word processing contest.
Abacus club
Members regularly attend the national business convention.
Tea ceremony club
Practices traditional tea ceremony and etiquette.
Bookkeeping club
Practices accounting.
Public relations club
Publishes the school newspaper; responsible for some announcements/broadcasts.
Calligraphy club
Practices Japanese calligraphy, participates in contests for young calligraphers.
English club
Studies for the Zensho and STEP pre-2nd or 2nd grade English exams, regularly participates in the prefectural speech contest held in October.
Art club
Makes decorations for the school sports festival, makes posters for Tomishop, designs Prism's cover, holds an art exhibition with the calligraphy club every year.
Planning club/student government
established in 2009, plans Tomishop, acts as the executive committee for Tomishop.

== Notable Graduates ==
Kohichi Akiyama (秋山 鴻市, Akiyama Kohichi)
Kohichi Akiyama is a professional trombonist. After attending Toyama Shogyo High School, he graduated from Tokyo University of the Arts. He later won a position with the Yomiuri Symphonic Orchestra, and became a special professor of Senzoku University. He was awarded the Toyama and Yasutake prizes.
Masahiko Nishimura (西村 雅彦, Nishimura Masahiko)
Masahiko Nishimura graduated from Toyama Shogyo in 1979. He is a professional TV, Film, and Theatre actor. He is best known for his comic roles. He has won best supporting actor at the Japanese Academy Awards, Blue Ribbon Awards, and the 22nd Hochi Film Awards, for multiple roles.
Yuki Yamazaki (山崎 勇喜, Yamazaki Yūki)
Yuki Yamazaki represented Japan at the Beijing Olympics in 2008 where he took 11th place. He is a race walker. He came in 2nd in the Asian Championships 20 km race in 2003.
Masato Nakazawa (中澤 雅人, Nakazawa Masato)
Masato Nakazawa graduated from Toyama Shogyo’s accounting course. He is now a professional baseball player with the Tokyo Yakult Swallows.
