= Higashi-Shinjō Station =

Higashi-Shinjō Station may refer to:

- Higashi-Shinjō Station (Toyama)
- Higashi-Shinjō Station (Miyagi)
