= Masato Nakazawa =

Japanese baseball player

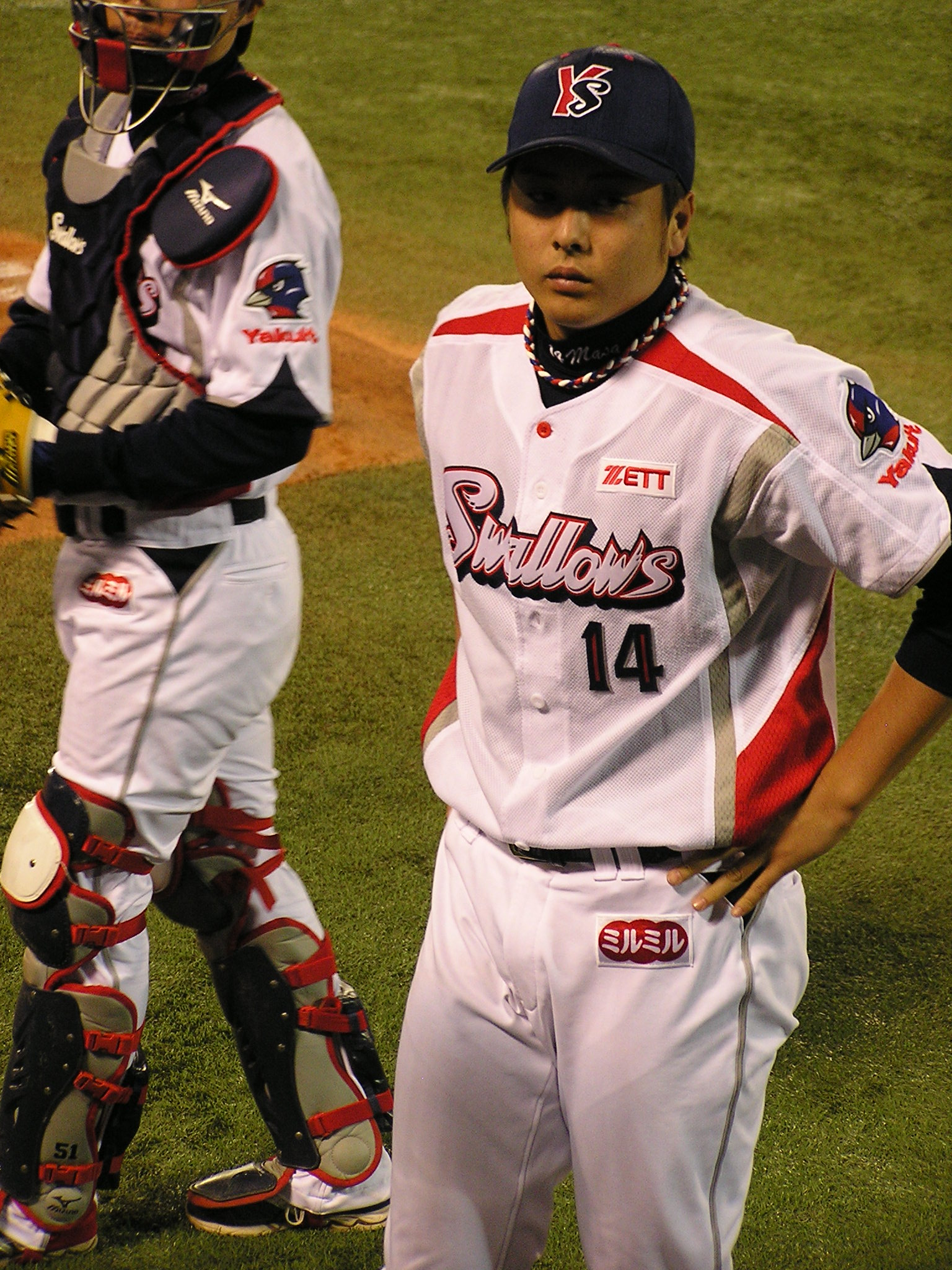
- Pitcher
- Born: February 16, 1985 (age 41); Toyama, Toyama, Japan
- Batted: Right Threw: Right

debut
- March 30, 2010, for the Tokyo Yakult Swallows

Last appearance
- October 3, 2020, for the Tokyo Yakult Swallows

NPB statistics (through 2020 season)
- Win–loss record: 13–15
- Holds: 21
- ERA: 5.16
- Strikeouts: 196
- Stats at Baseball Reference

Teams
- Tokyo Yakult Swallows (2010–2020)

Masato Nakazawa (中澤 雅人, Nakazawa Masato; born February 16, 1985 in Toyama, Toyama, Japan) is a Japanese former professional baseball pitcher. He has played in Nippon Professional Baseball (NPB) for the Tokyo Yakult Swallows.

== Career ==
Tokyo Yakult Swallows selected Kazahari with the first selection in the 2009 NPB draft.

On March 30, 2010, Nakazawa made his NPB debut.

On October 24, 2020, Nakazawa announced his retirement.
