= Daisenji Station =

Railway station in Toyama, Toyama Prefecture, Japan

Daisenji Station 大川寺駅
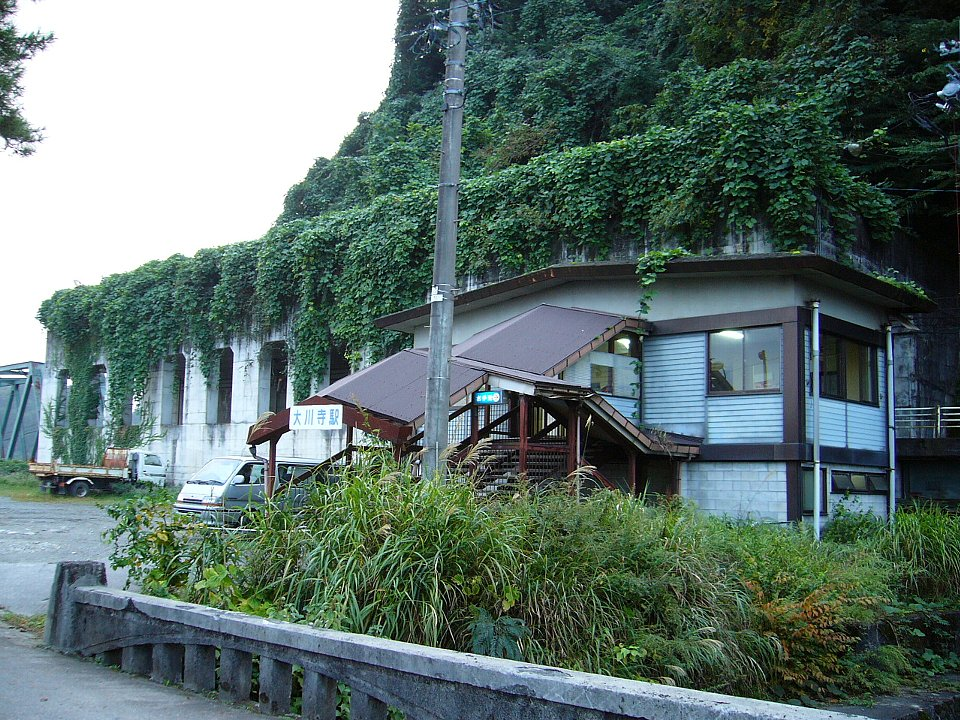
- Daisenji Station in October 2006

General information
- Location: 11 Kamidaki, Toyama-shi Toyama-ken 930-1312; Japan
- Coordinates: 36.6083°N 137.3089°E
- Operator: Toyama Chihō Railway
- Line: ■ Kamidaki Line
- Distance: 11.2 km from Minami-Toyama
- Platforms: 1 side platform
- Tracks: 1

Other information
- Status: Unstaffed
- Website: Official website

History
- Opened: 10 June 1929

Passengers
- FY2015: 50 daily
Location
- Location within Japan

Daisenji Station (大川寺駅, Daisenji-eki) is a railway station on the Toyama Chihō Railway Kamidaki Line in the city of Toyama, Toyama Prefecture, Japan, operated by the private railway operator Toyama Chihō Railway.

== Lines ==
Kaihotsu Station is served by the Toyama Chihō Railway Kamidaki Line, and is 11.2 kilometers from the starting point of the line at Minami-Toyama.

== Station layout ==
The station has one ground-level side platform serving a single bi-directional track. The station is unattended.

== Adjacent stations ==
«	Service	»
Toyama Chihō Railway Kamidaki Line
Kamidaki	-	Iwakuraji

== History ==
Daisenji Station opened on 10 June 1929 as Kamidaki Koenshita Station (上滝公園下駅). It was renamed Daisenji Koen Station (大川寺公園駅) on 1 January 1959, and Daisenji Yuen Station (大川寺遊園駅) on 1 October 1967. It was renamed again to its present name on 1 April 1997.

== Surrounding area ==
- Daisenji Amusement Park

== See also ==
- List of railway stations in Japan
