= Toyama University of International Studies =

Private University in Toyama, Japan

- 富山国際大学
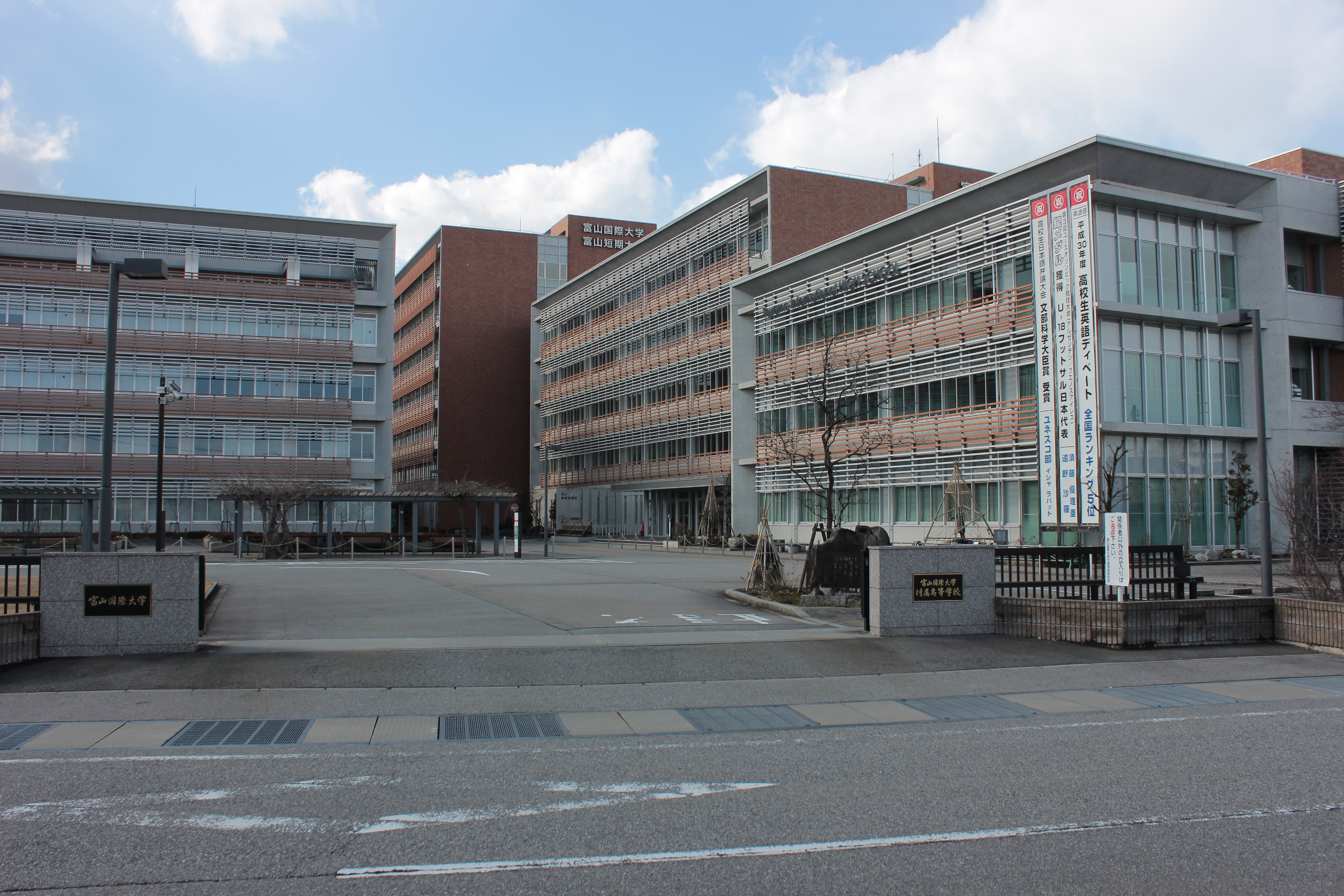
- Toyama University of International studies
- Type: Private university
- Established: 1963
- Location: Toyama, Toyama, Japan
- Campus: Higashikuromaki Campus 36°35′59″N 137°16′26.5″E Kureha Campus 36°43′19.5″N 137°8′22.7″E
- Website: http://www.tuins.ac.jp/

Toyama University of International Studies (富山国際大学, Toyama kokusai daigaku) is a private university in Toyama, Toyama, Japan. Toyama College is attached to the Kureha Campus. The predecessor of the school was founded in 1963, and it was chartered as a university in 1990.
