= Toyama (city) =

Toyama 富山市
- Prefecture capital and Core city
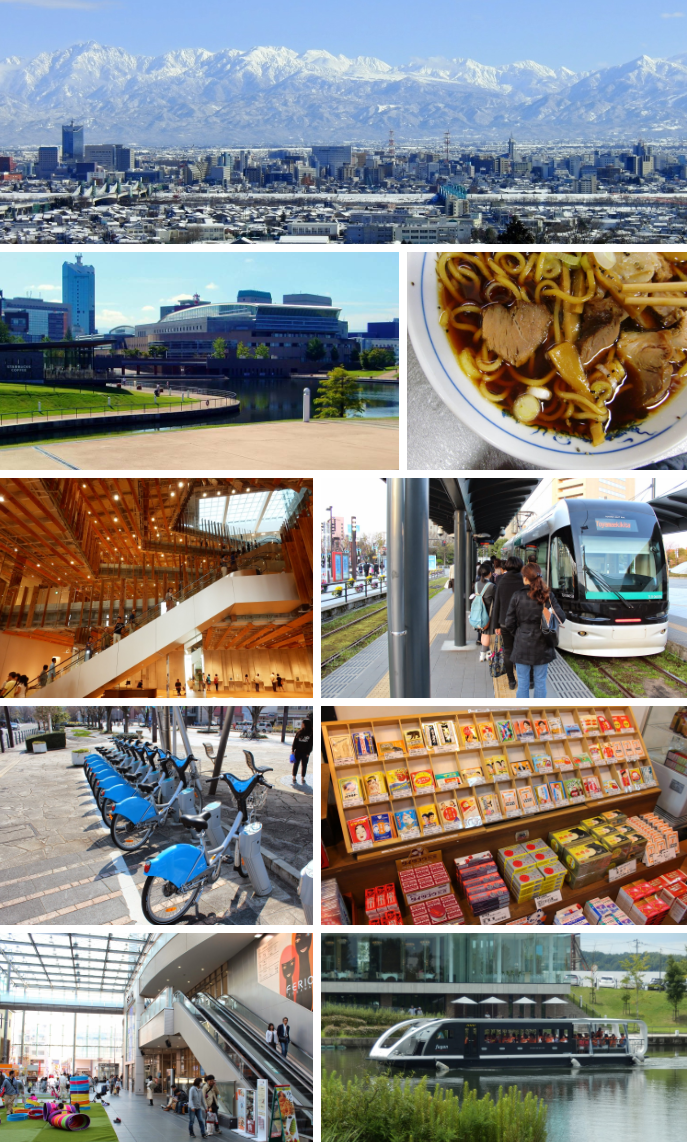
- (From top, left to right : Kureha Hills •Tomiiwa Canal Kansui Park • Toyama Black Ramen• Toyama Glass Museum• Toyama Light Rail • Avile • Toyama Drug Sales • Sogawa Ferio • Fugan Canal)

- Flag Seal

- Location of Toyama in Toyama Prefecture

- Coordinates: 36°41′45.3″N 137°12′49.3″E
- Country: Japan
- Region: Chūbu (Hokuriku)
- Prefecture: Toyama
- First official recorded: 6th century AD
- City settled: April 1, 1889

Government
  - Mayor: Hirohisa Fujii

Area
  - Prefecture capital and Core city: 1,241.77 km^{2} (479.45 sq mi)

Population (June 1, 2019)
  - Prefecture capital and Core city: 415,844
  - Density: 334.880/km^{2} (867.335/sq mi)
  - Metro (2015): 1,066,328 (16th)
- Time zone: UTC+9 (JST)
- Postal code: 930-8510
- Symbols
  - Tree: Zelkova serrata
  - Flower: Helianthus annuus
  - Flowering tree: Camellia japonica
- Phone number: 076-431-6111
- Address: 7-38 Shinsakuramachi, Toyama-shi, Toyama-ken
- Website: Official website

Toyama (富山市, Toyama-shi; Japanese pronunciation: [tó̞.jä̀.mä̀, tò̞.jä́.mä́.ɕì]) is the capital city of Toyama Prefecture, Japan, located on the coast of the Sea of Japan in the Chūbu region on central Honshū, about 200 km (120 mi) north of the city of Nagoya and 300 km (190 mi) northwest of Tokyo. As of 1 June 2019, the city had an estimated population of 415,844 in 176,643 households, and a population density of 335 persons per km^{2}. Its total area was 1,241.77 square kilometres (479.45 sq mi). The city has been designated an environmental model city by the national government for its efforts to reduce the emission of greenhouse gases.

== Geography ==
Located in the middle of its prefecture, Toyama is a seaside city by the coast of the Sea of Japan. Its municipal territory borders with the Gifu Prefecture and with the municipalities of Imizu, Namerikawa, Tonami, Nanto, Hida and Takayama. The nearest towns are Imizu (west), and Namerikawa (east), both by the sea and part of the Toyama urban area. The nearest major city is Kanazawa, the capital of Ishikawa Prefecture, which is 65 km (40 miles) away.

=== Climate ===
Toyama has a humid subtropical climate (Köppen climate classification Cfa) with hot, humid summers and cool winters. Precipitation is abundant throughout the year, particularly in July, September and from November through January. Despite winter in Toyama being relatively mild, its position near the Sea of Japan places it within the heavy snow belt of Japan and on average 3.8 m (12 ft) of snow falls each season, almost all of it from December through March, as well as occasionally experiencing some tremendous amounts of snowfall.

Climate data for Toyama (1991−2020 normals, extremes 1939−present)
Month	Jan	Feb	Mar	Apr	May	Jun	Jul	Aug	Sep	Oct	Nov	Dec	Year
Record high °C (°F)	20.9 (69.6)	22.5 (72.5)	28.3 (82.9)	32.4 (90.3)	33.3 (91.9)	37.2 (99.0)	38.8 (101.8)	39.8 (103.6)	38.3 (100.9)	33.3 (91.9)	29.2 (84.6)	24.8 (76.6)	39.8 (103.6)
Mean maximum °C (°F)	13.3 (55.9)	15.8 (60.4)	21.8 (71.2)	27.0 (80.6)	30.2 (86.4)	32.1 (89.8)	35.9 (96.6)	36.6 (97.9)	34.0 (93.2)	28.4 (83.1)	23.0 (73.4)	17.3 (63.1)	37.1 (98.8)
Mean daily maximum °C (°F)	6.3 (43.3)	7.4 (45.3)	11.8 (53.2)	17.6 (63.7)	22.7 (72.9)	25.7 (78.3)	29.8 (85.6)	31.4 (88.5)	27.0 (80.6)	21.6 (70.9)	15.7 (60.3)	9.5 (49.1)	18.9 (66.0)
Daily mean °C (°F)	3.0 (37.4)	3.4 (38.1)	6.9 (44.4)	12.3 (54.1)	17.5 (63.5)	21.4 (70.5)	25.5 (77.9)	26.9 (80.4)	22.8 (73.0)	17.0 (62.6)	11.2 (52.2)	5.7 (42.3)	14.5 (58.1)
Mean daily minimum °C (°F)	0.2 (32.4)	0.1 (32.2)	2.6 (36.7)	7.4 (45.3)	12.9 (55.2)	17.7 (63.9)	22.1 (71.8)	23.2 (73.8)	19.1 (66.4)	13.1 (55.6)	7.3 (45.1)	2.5 (36.5)	10.7 (51.3)
Mean minimum °C (°F)	−3.7 (25.3)	−3.8 (25.2)	−1.8 (28.8)	1.6 (34.9)	7.5 (45.5)	13.1 (55.6)	18.6 (65.5)	19.4 (66.9)	13.6 (56.5)	7.2 (45.0)	2.1 (35.8)	−1.6 (29.1)	−4.4 (24.1)
Record low °C (°F)	−11.9 (10.6)	−11.1 (12.0)	−7.0 (19.4)	−2.2 (28.0)	2.3 (36.1)	7.7 (45.9)	13.0 (55.4)	14.1 (57.4)	8.9 (48.0)	1.9 (35.4)	−2.0 (28.4)	−8.5 (16.7)	−11.9 (10.6)
Average precipitation mm (inches)	259.0 (10.20)	171.7 (6.76)	164.6 (6.48)	134.5 (5.30)	122.8 (4.83)	172.6 (6.80)	245.6 (9.67)	207.0 (8.15)	218.1 (8.59)	171.9 (6.77)	224.8 (8.85)	281.6 (11.09)	2,374.2 (93.47)
Average snowfall cm (inches)	104 (41)	84 (33)	17 (6.7)	1 (0.4)	0 (0)	0 (0)	0 (0)	0 (0)	0 (0)	0 (0)	0 (0)	49 (19)	253 (100)
Average precipitation days (≥ 0.5 mm)	23.7	19.9	18.2	13.5	12.0	12.1	15.3	11.6	13.7	14.2	17.9	23.0	194.9
Average relative humidity (%)	82	78	72	68	70	78	79	77	78	77	77	81	76
Mean monthly sunshine hours	68.1	89.7	135.9	173.6	199.9	154.0	153.3	201.4	144.2	143.1	105.1	70.7	1,647.2
Source: Japan Meteorological Agency

== History ==
=== Early history ===
The area of present-day Toyama city was part of ancient Etchū Province. The Toyama Plain is good farmland and historically it was a point of strategic and traffic importance since prehistoric times.

==== Feudal period ====
During the Sengoku period, it was frequently a battlefield, coming under the control of warlord Sassa Narimasa, who built a castle town around Toyama Castle and channeled rivers to bringing about a flourishing agricultural industry.

=== Early modern ages ===
Edo period

The area subsequently became part of Kaga Domain under the Maeda clan during the Edo period, during which time a positive industrial promotion policy was implemented on the production of Chinese medicine and washi (Japanese paper). Also, thanks to the improvement of kitamaebune sea transportation routes, these industries thrived and Toyama became known nationwide as the province of medicine.

==== Meiji period ====
After the Meiji Restoration, with the creation of the municipalities system, the city of Toyama was established on April 1, 1889, as one of the first 30 cities in Japan. Economically, the area developed heavy and chemical industries based on abundant hydroelectric electricity. Toyama has become one of the most influential cities on the Sea of Japan with its good water supply, drainage system and thriving agricultural, forestry, fishery, commercial and manufacturing industries.

==== Pacific War ====
During the Pacific War, Allied prisoners of war (POWs) were sent to Toyama as forced labor. The city was almost completely destroyed on the night of August 1–2, 1945. At the time of the bombing, the city was a center for aluminum, ball-bearing and special steel production. Left unscathed however, were the war-related factories just outside the city. The city during the time had a population of around 150,000 residents. The city also held Kakure Kirishitan, or "Hidden Christians" in Japan, forced from Nagasaki into internment camps after the Tokugawa government tried to punish them for their Christian beliefs.

Gallery

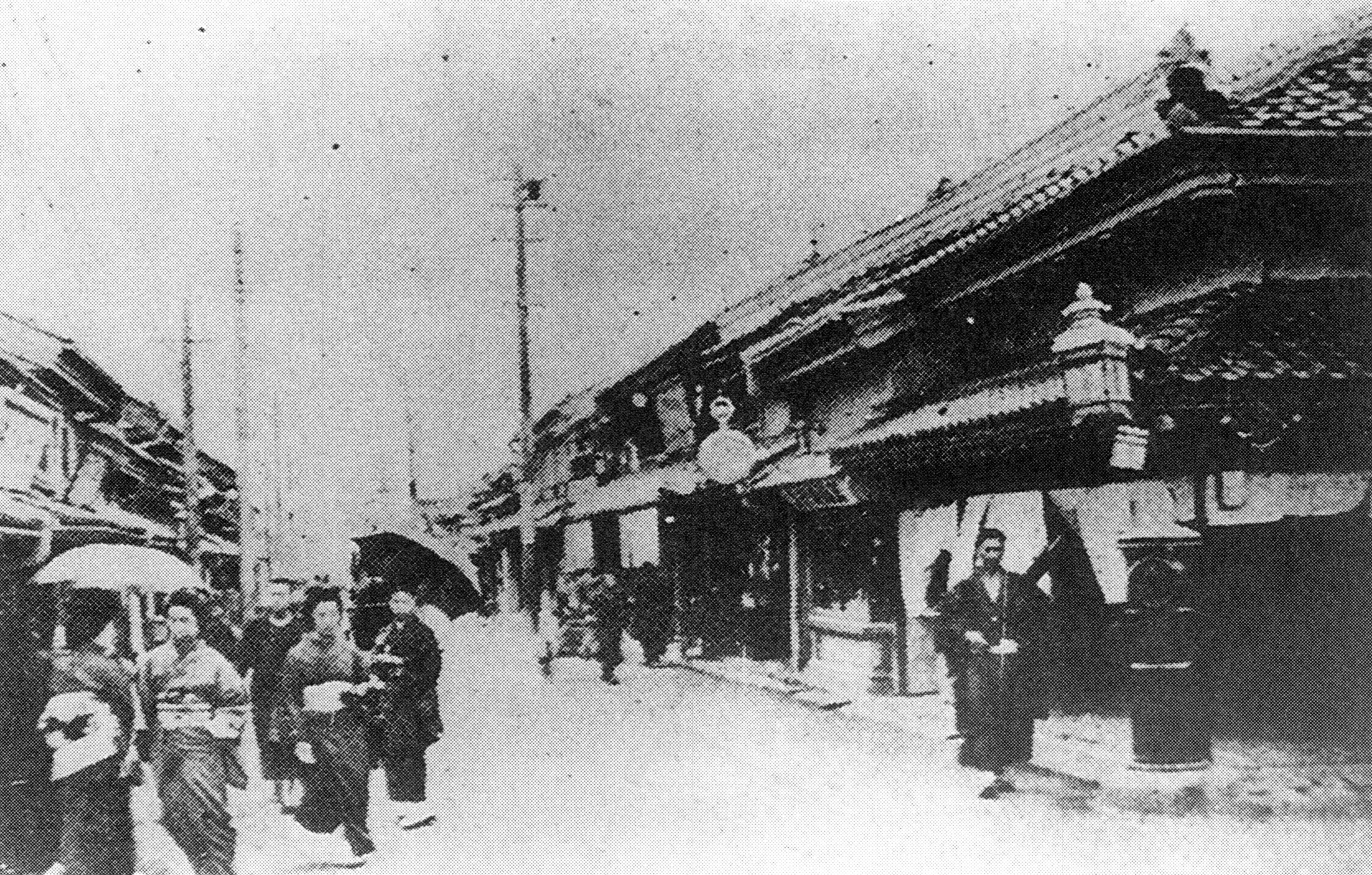
Higashiaimon-cho Street in Toyama in late Meiji era

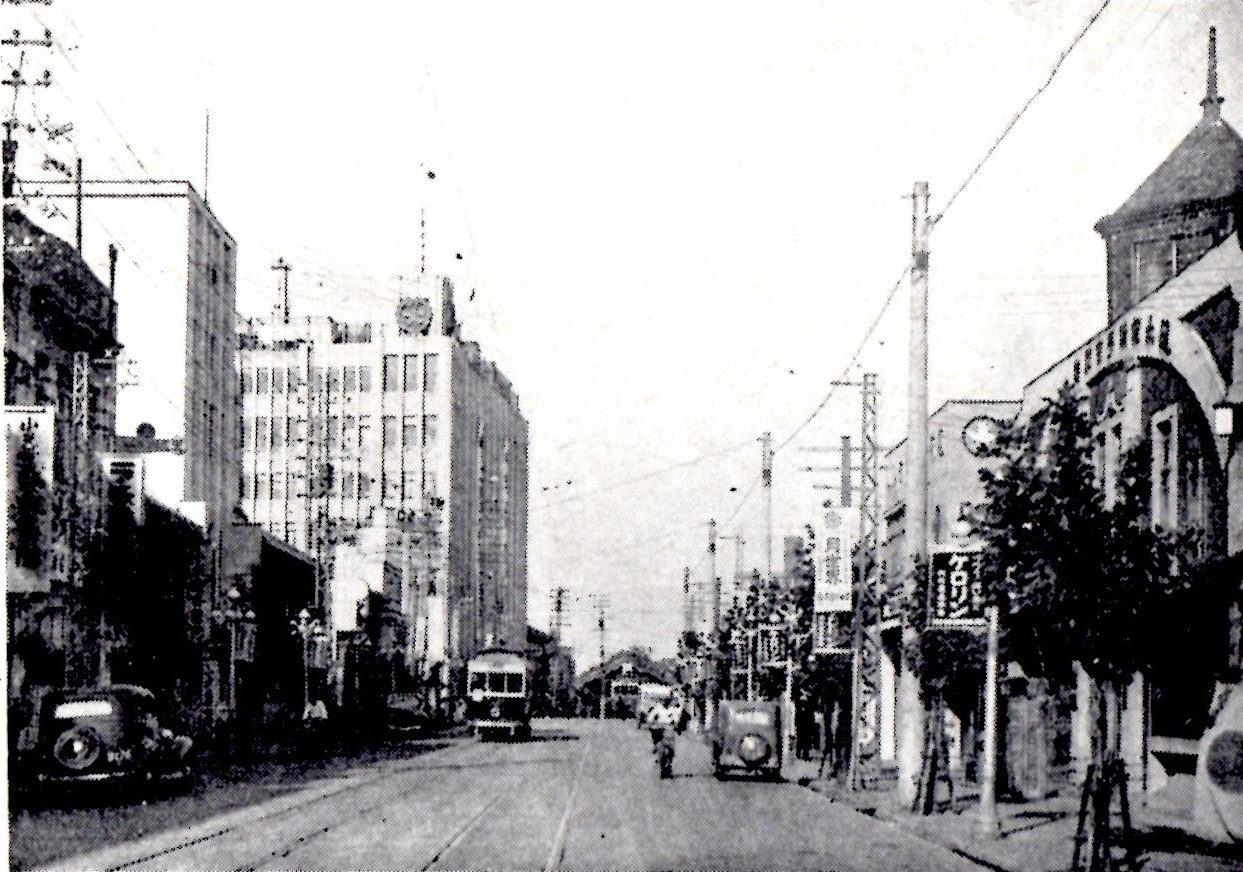
Toyama before the Pacific War

=== Contemporary ages ===
==== 2005 mergers ====
On April 1, 2005, the towns of Ōsawano and Ōyama (both from Kaminiikawa District), the towns of Fuchū and Yatsuo, and the villages of Hosoiri and Yamada (all from Nei District) were merged into Toyama. Kaminiikawa District and Nei District were both dissolved as a result of this merger.

=== Demographics ===
Per Japanese census data, the population of Toyama has recently plateaued after a long period of growth.

Historical population
Year	Pop.	±%
1970	350,085	—
1980	391,554	+11.8%
1990	408,942	+4.4%
2000	420,804	+2.9%
2010	421,953	+0.3%
2020	413,938	−1.9%

=== Surrounding municipalities ===
Gifu Prefecture

- Hida
- Takayama

Nagano Prefecture

- Ōmachi

Toyama Prefecture

- Funahashi
- Imizu
- Kamiichi
- Namerikawa
- Nanto
- Tateyama
- Tonami

== Government ==
Toyama has a mayor-council form of government with a directly elected mayor and a unicameral city legislature of 38 members.

== Sister cities ==
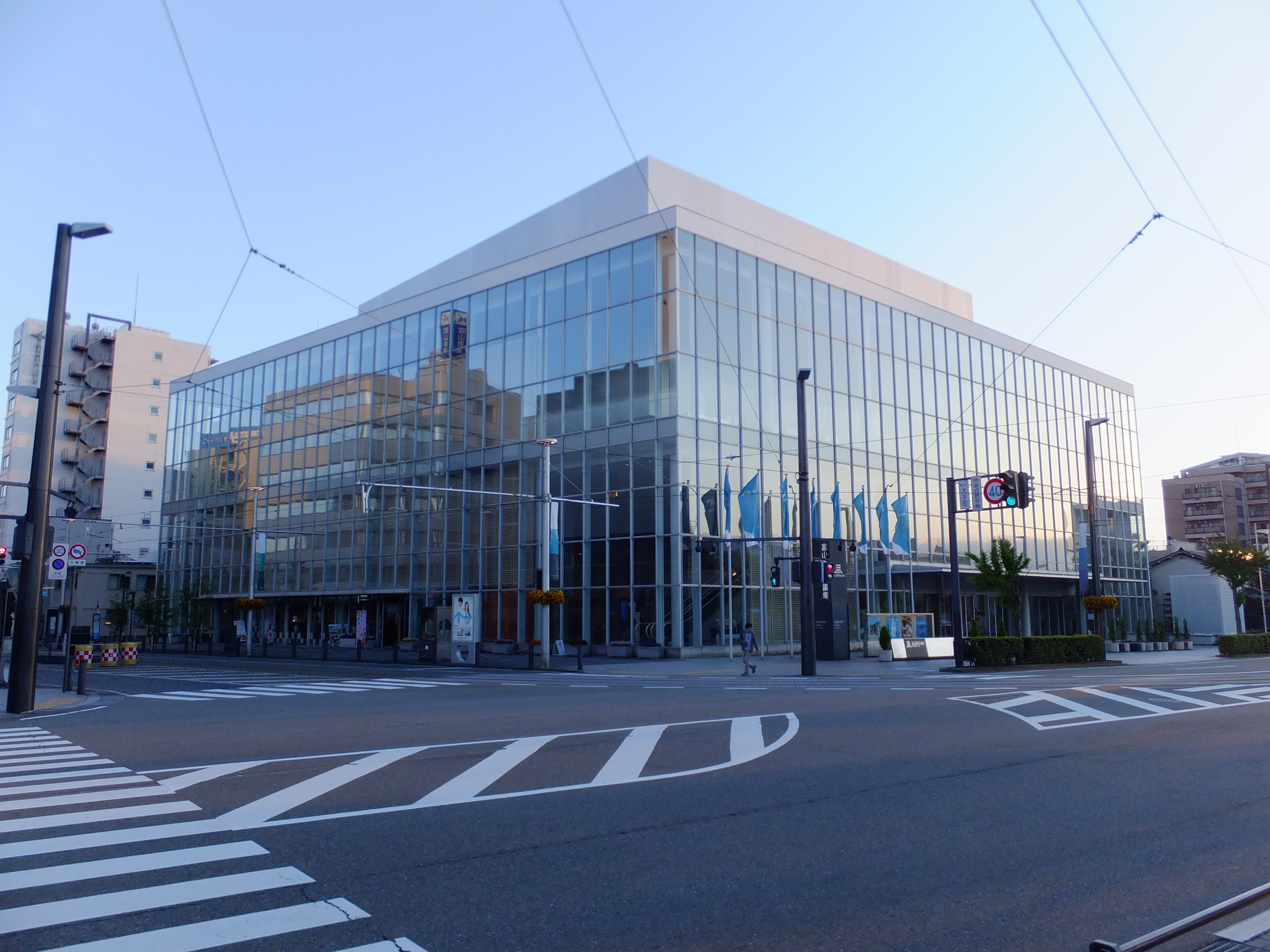
Toyama International Conference Center

Toyama is twinned with:

City	Country	State	Since
Mogi das Cruzes	Brazil	São Paulo	November 8, 1979
Durham	United States	North Carolina	June 13, 1989
Wellington	Australia	New South Wales	August 24, 1992
Gwangju	South Korea	Special cities	2011

Friendship city

City	Country	State	Since
Qinhuangdao	China	Hebei	May 8, 1981

== Economy ==
Hokuriku Electric Power Company (colloquially known as Hokuden), the regional power-supply monopoly, is based in Toyama. Bearing parts and industrial robot company Nachi-Fujikoshi and software company INTEC are also headquartered in Toyama.

Regional banks include Hokuriku Bank, First Bank of Toyama, and Toyama Bank.

== Education ==
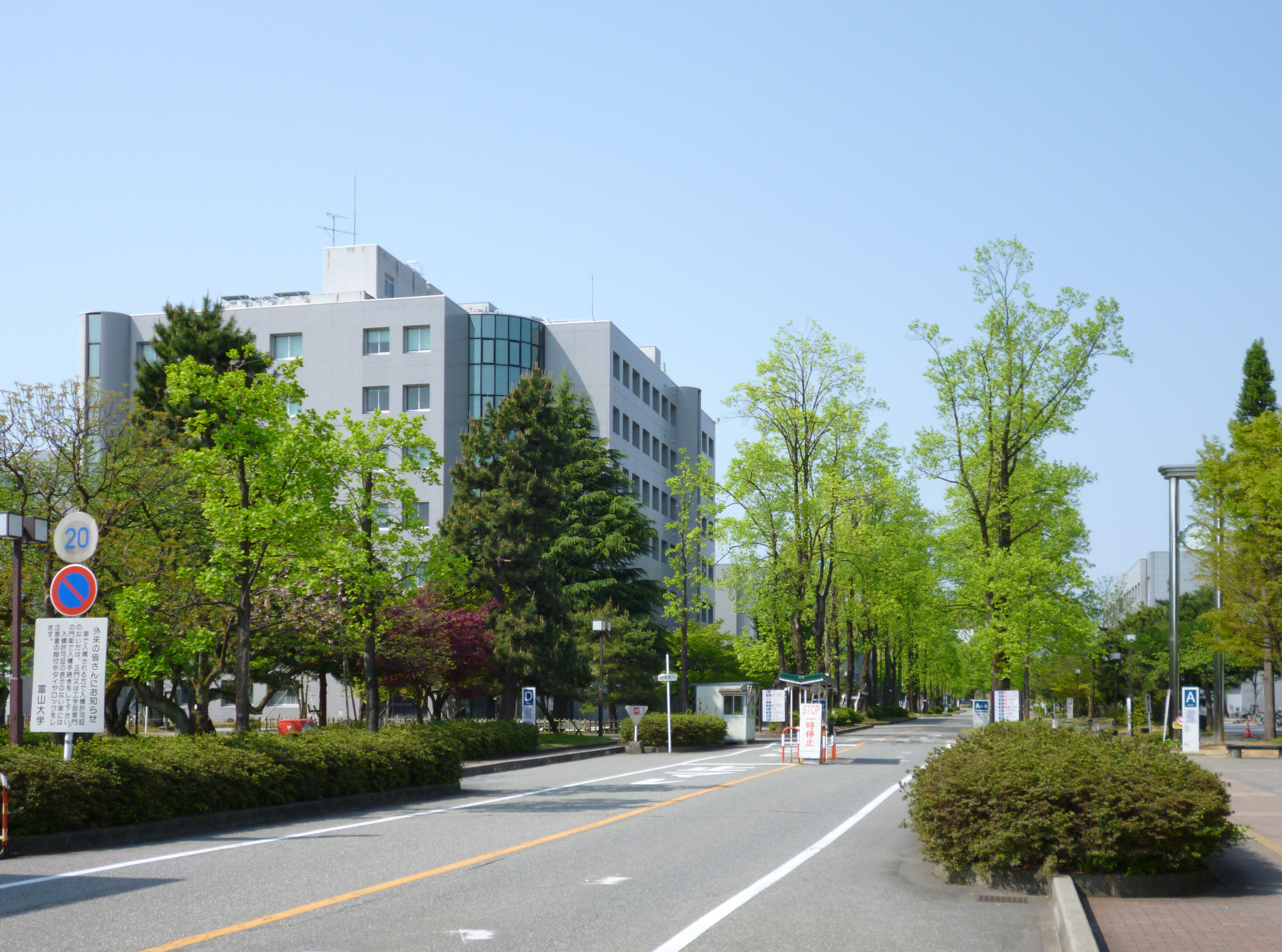
University of Toyama

=== Colleges and universities ===
- Toyama College
- Toyama National College of Technology
- Toyama Prefectural University
- Toyama University of International Studies
- University of Toyama

=== Primary and secondary education ===
Toyama has 65 public elementary schools and 26 public middle schools operated by the city government. There is also one public elementary school and one public middle school operated by the national government. The city has fourteen public high schools operated by the Toyama Prefectural Board of Education. and one public combined middle/high school operated by the national government. There are also seven private high schools. Toyama Shogyo High School is a commercial high school.

== Transportation ==
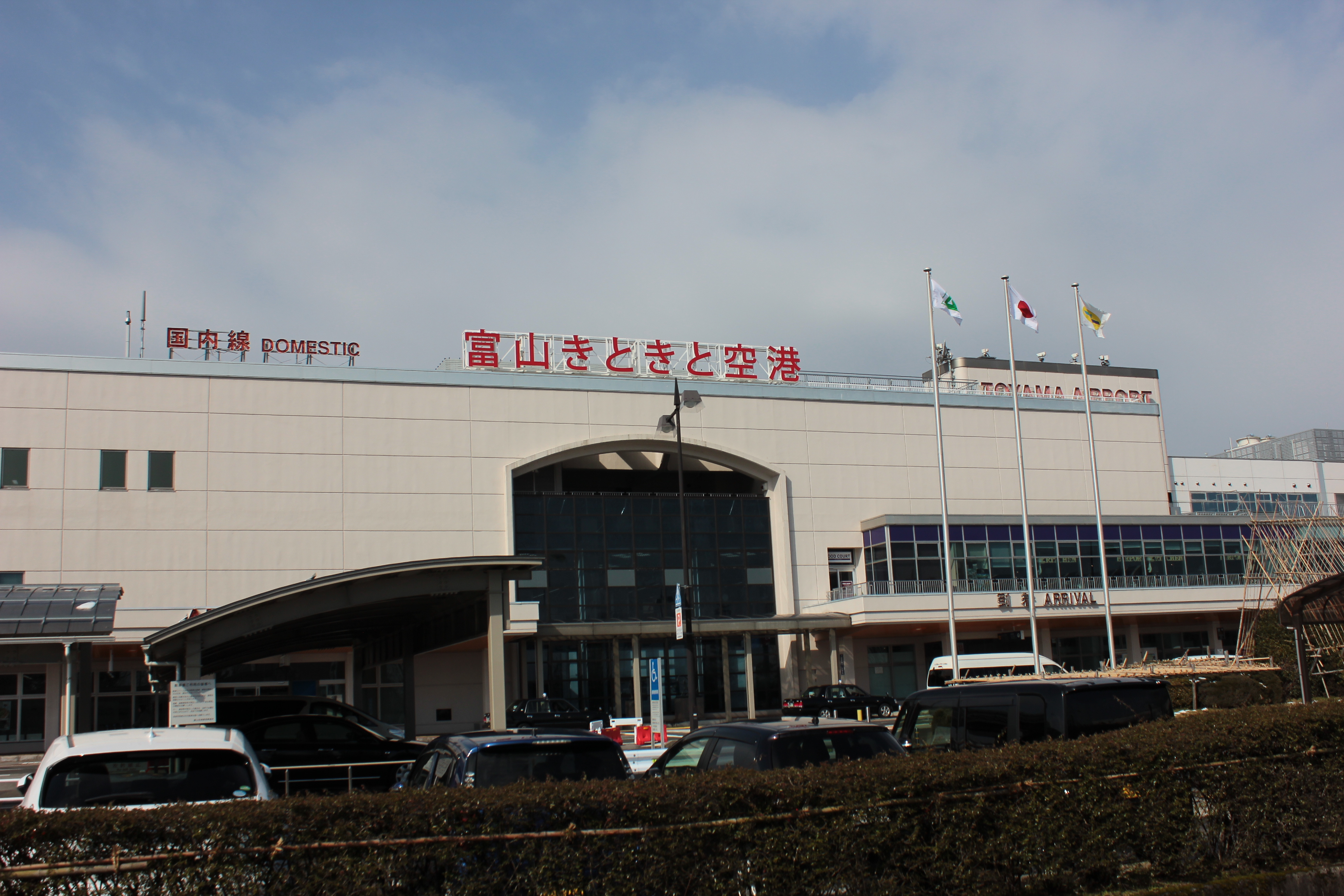
Toyama Airport

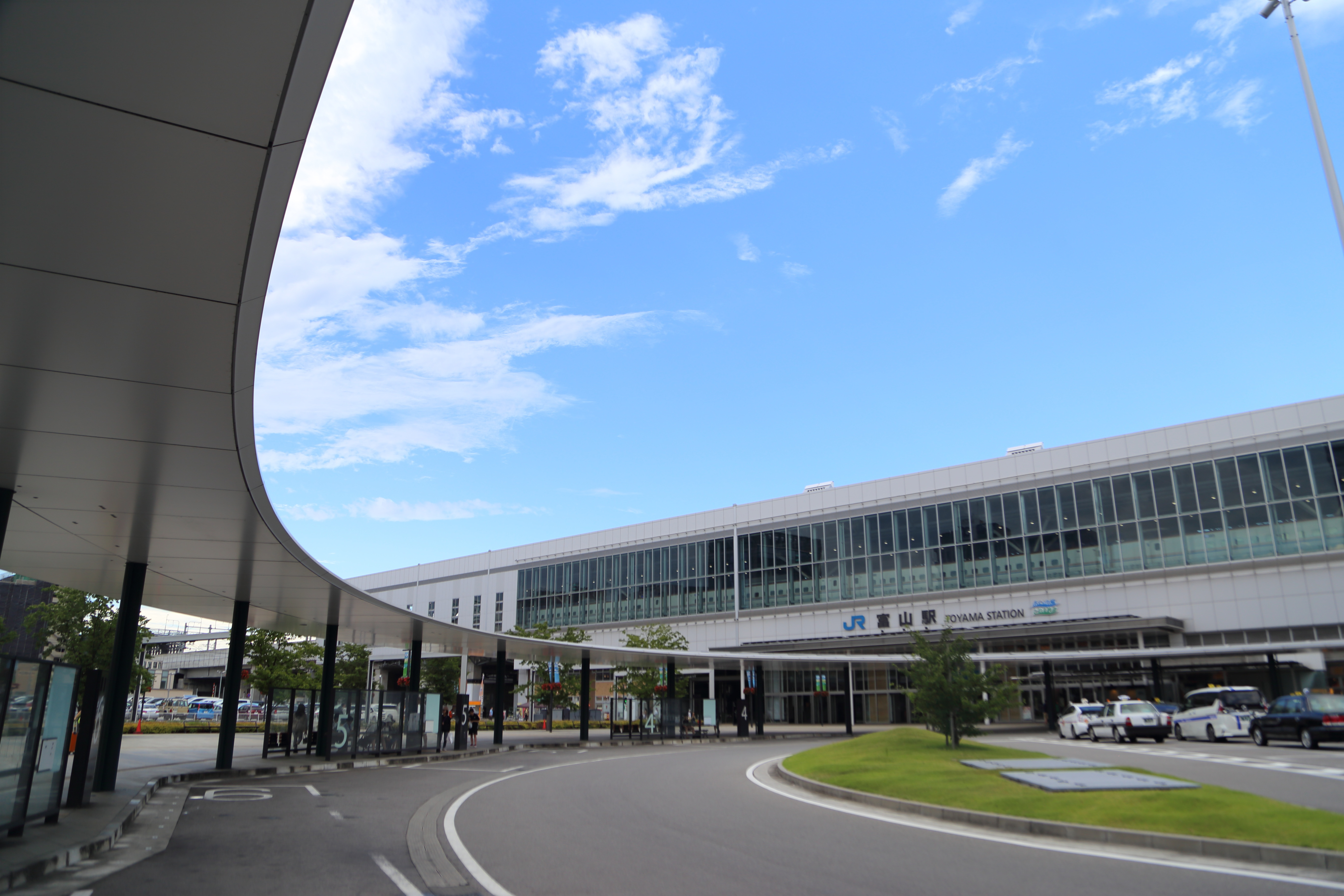
Toyama Station

Toyama Chiho Railroad Linemap

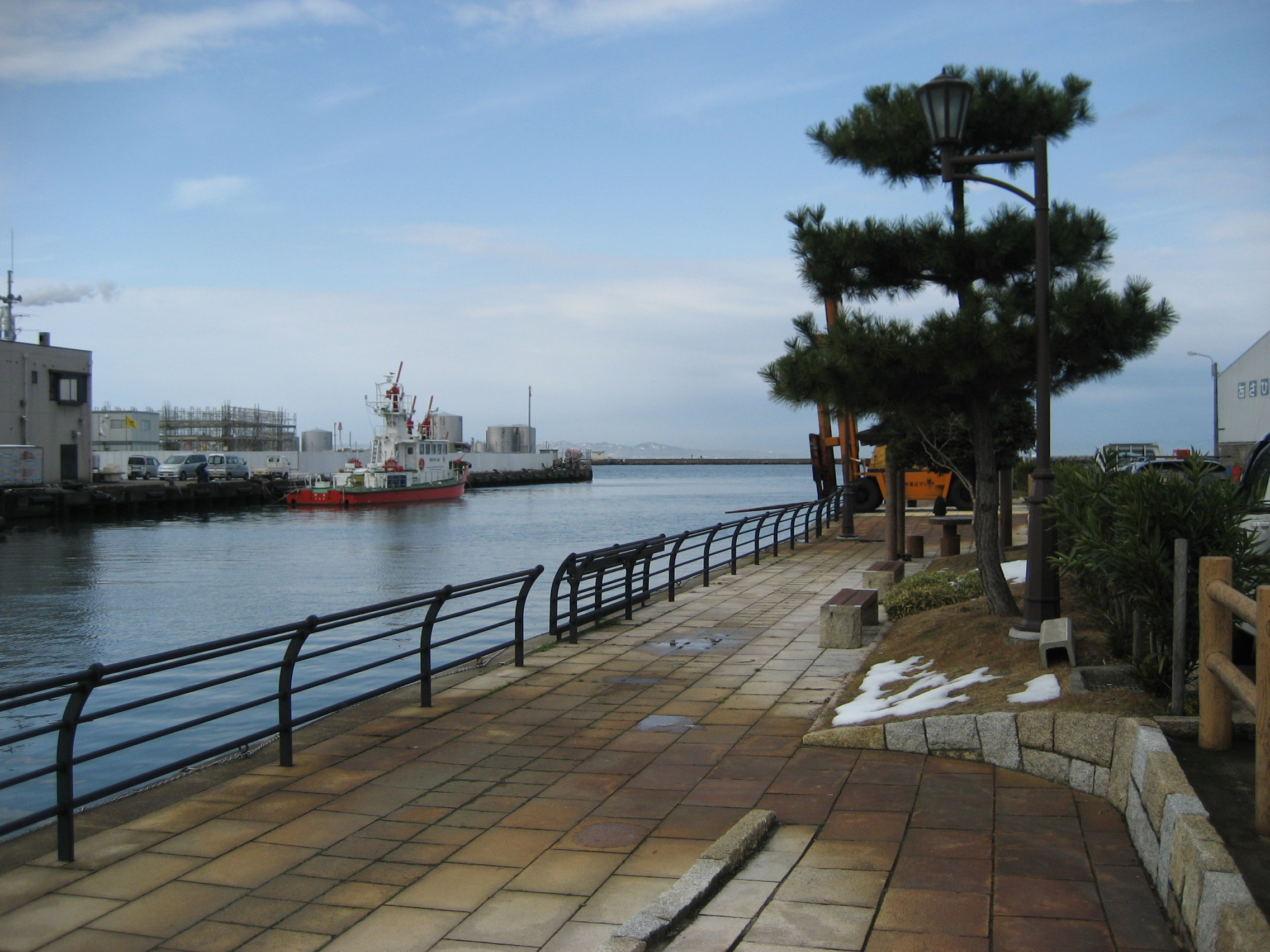
Port of Toyama

=== Airways ===
==== Airports ====
- Toyama Airport

=== Railways ===
==== High-speed rail ====
West Japan Railway Company (JR West)

- Hokuriku Shinkansen: Toyama

==== Conventional lines ====
West Japan Railway Company (JR West)

- Takayama Main Line: Inotani - Nirehara - Sasazu - Higashi-Yatsuo - Etchū-Yatsuo - Chisato - Hayahoshi - Fuchū-Usaka - Nishi-Toyama - Toyama

Central Japan Railway Company (JR Tōkai)

- Takayama Main Line: Inotani -

Ainokaze Toyama Railway

- Ainokaze Toyama Railway Line: - Kureha - Toyama - Higashi-Toyama - Mizuhashi -

Toyama Chihō Railway

- Main Line: Toyama - Inarimachi - Shinjō-Tanaka - Higashi-Shinjō - Etchū-Ebara - Etchū-Sangō
- Kamidaki Line: Inarimachi - Fujikoshi - Ōizumi - Minami-Toyama - Asanamachi - Kamihori - Kosugi - Nunoichi - Kaihotsu - Tsukioka - Ōshō - Kamidaki - Daisenji
- Tateyama Line: Arimineguchi - Hongū

=== Tramways ===
Toyama Chihō Railway

- Toyama Light Rail Toyamakō Line
- Toyama City Tram Line

=== Roads ===
==== Expressway ====
- Hokuriku Expressway : Nagaresugi IC - Toyama IC - Toyama-nishi IC

==== Japan National Route ====
- National Route 8
- National Route 41
- National Route 359
- National Route 360
- National Route 415
- National Route 471
- National Route 472

=== Seaways ===
==== Seaport ====
- Port of Toyama

== Local attractions ==
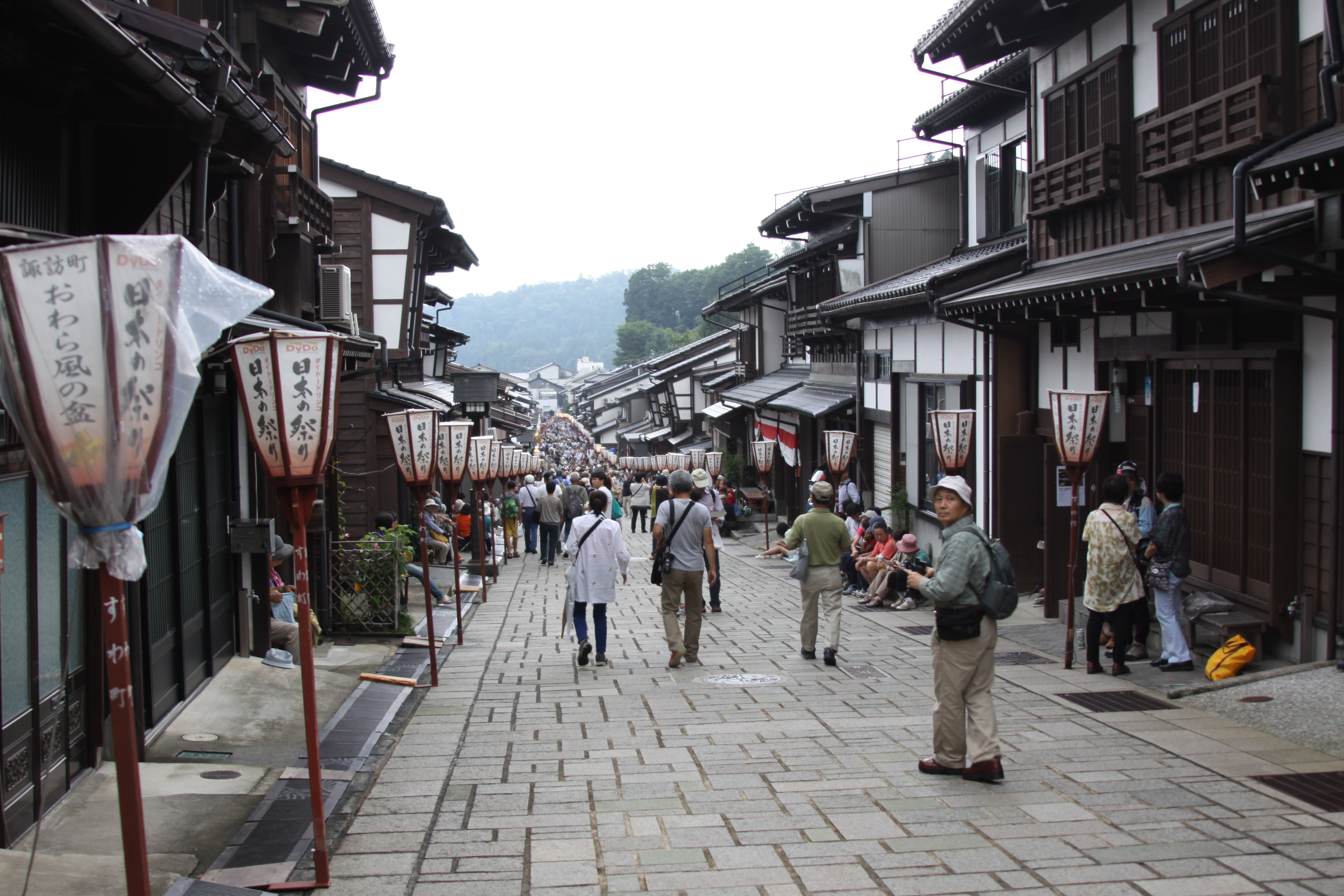
Yatsuo Area

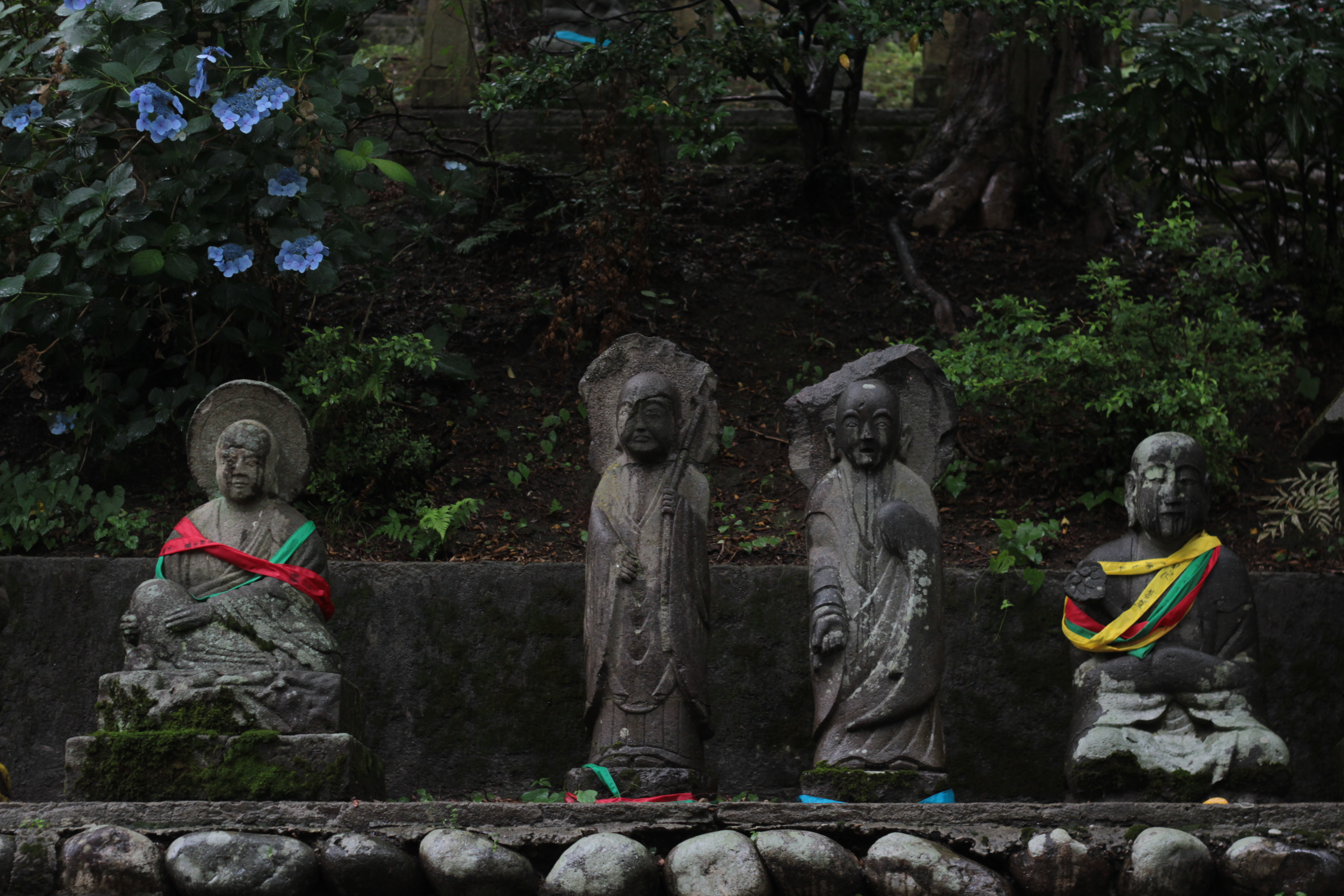
Gohyaku rakan - five hundred statues depicting arhats, at the Chōkei-ji temple in Toyama

- Botanic Gardens of Toyama
- Kitadai Site, Jomon period site, National Historic Site
- Kurobe Dam
- Museum of Modern Art of Toyama
- Ōzuka-Senbōyama Sites, Yayoi period settlement ruins and Kofun, National Historic Site
- Sugusaka Site, Japanese Paleolithic period site, National Historic Site
- Toyama Athletic Recreation Park Stadium, home of Toyama's representative in the J.League, Kataller Toyama football club
- Toyama Castle
- Toyama Chukyoin the smallest shinto shrine
- Toyama Glass Art Museum
- Toyama International Conference Center
- Toyamaken Gokoku Shrine
- Toyama Prefectural Museum of Art and Design, replaced the Museum of Modern Art of Toyama
- Yasuda Castle ruins, National Historic Site

== Culture ==
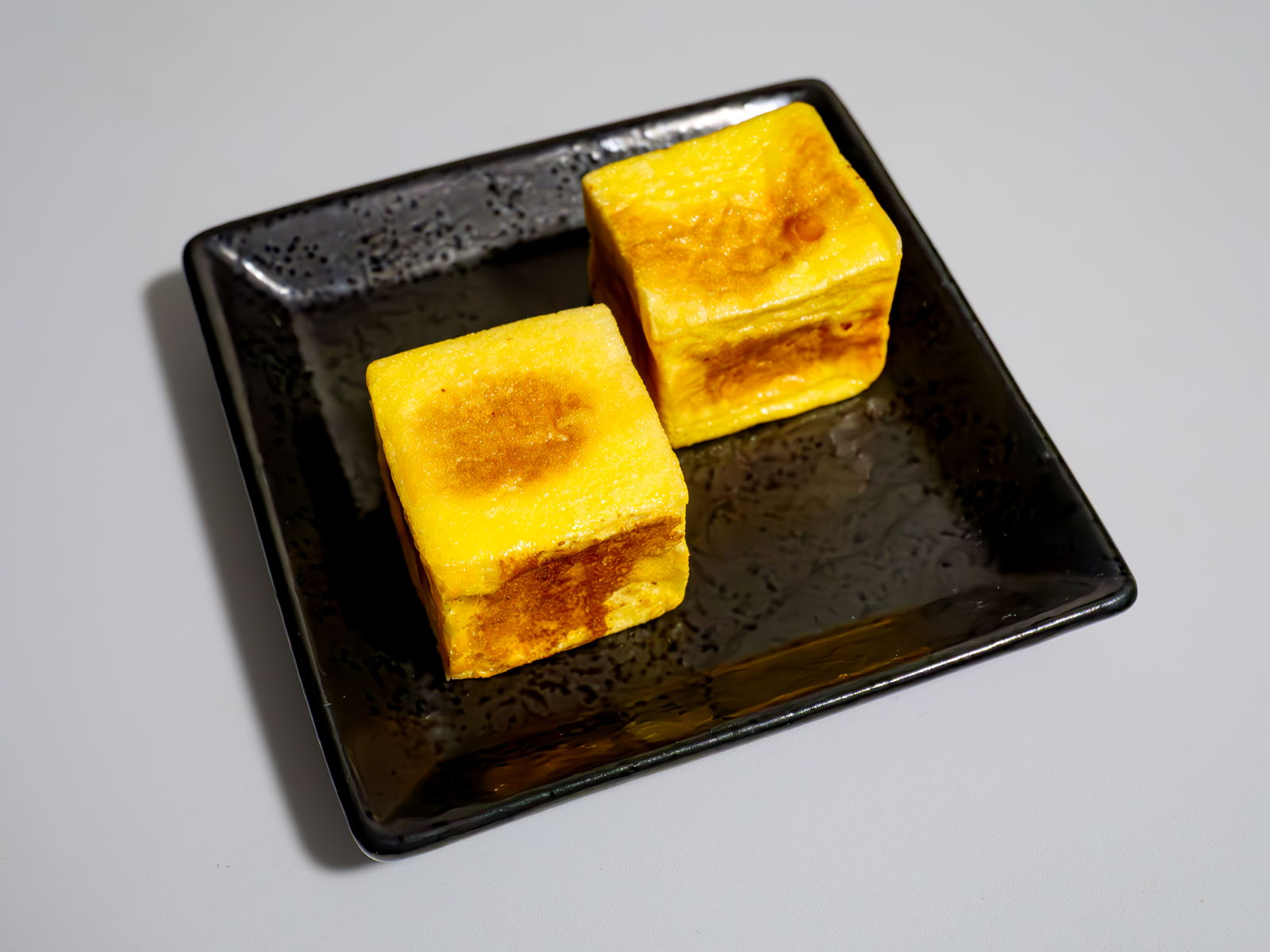
Owara-tamaten, a kind of wagashi from Toyama city made of egg white, sugar, and agar

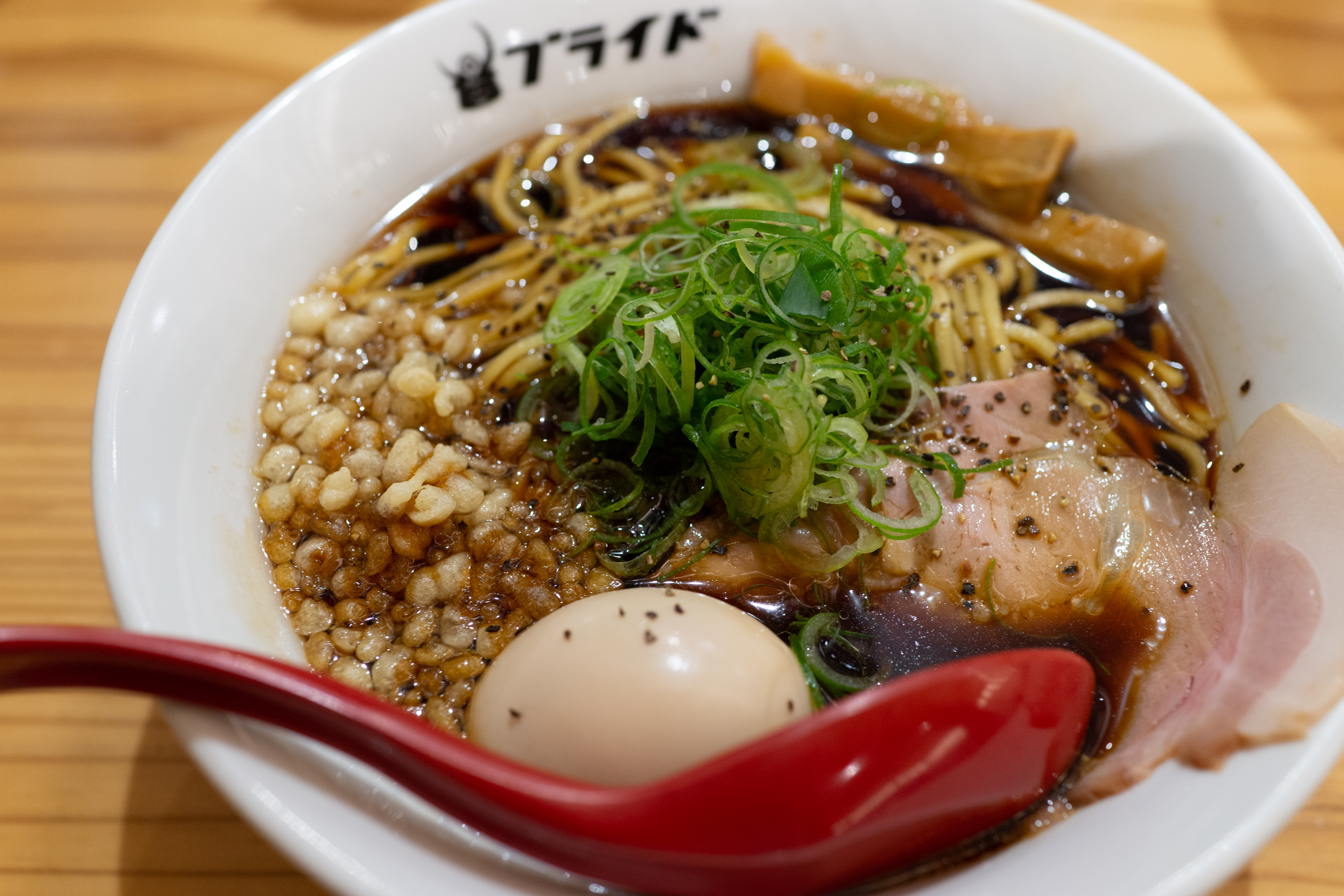
Toyama black ramen

=== Festivals and events ===
- Toyama Chindon Contest (Toyama Band of musical sandwichmen contest) – proposed by the Toyama Chamber of Commerce in 1955 and is held annually in early April. This event has become a festival, and many bands of sandwichmen (men wearing sandwich boards for advertisements) participate, attracting many tourists every year.
- Kaze No Bon – held annually on September 1 to 3, in the Yatsuo region.

== Notable people ==
- Gaku Matsumoto, actor
- Eikichi Minato, politician, Mayor of Toyama
- Ryūzō Sejima, Japanese army officer, business leader
- Koichi Tanaka, chemist, 2002 Nobel Prize in Chemistry winner.
- Tamisuke Watanuki, politician
- Kaede Yamada, member of Korean girl-group tripleS
- Hikaru Masai, Japanese singer, member of Kalafina
- Masato Nakazawa, former Japanese baseball player
- Rui Hachimura, basketball player for the Los Angeles Lakers in the NBA
- Sakura Tobi, member of Los Angeles-based girl group Saint Satine
