= Kamidaki Station =

Railway station in Toyama, Toyama Prefecture, Japan

Kamidaki Station 上滝駅
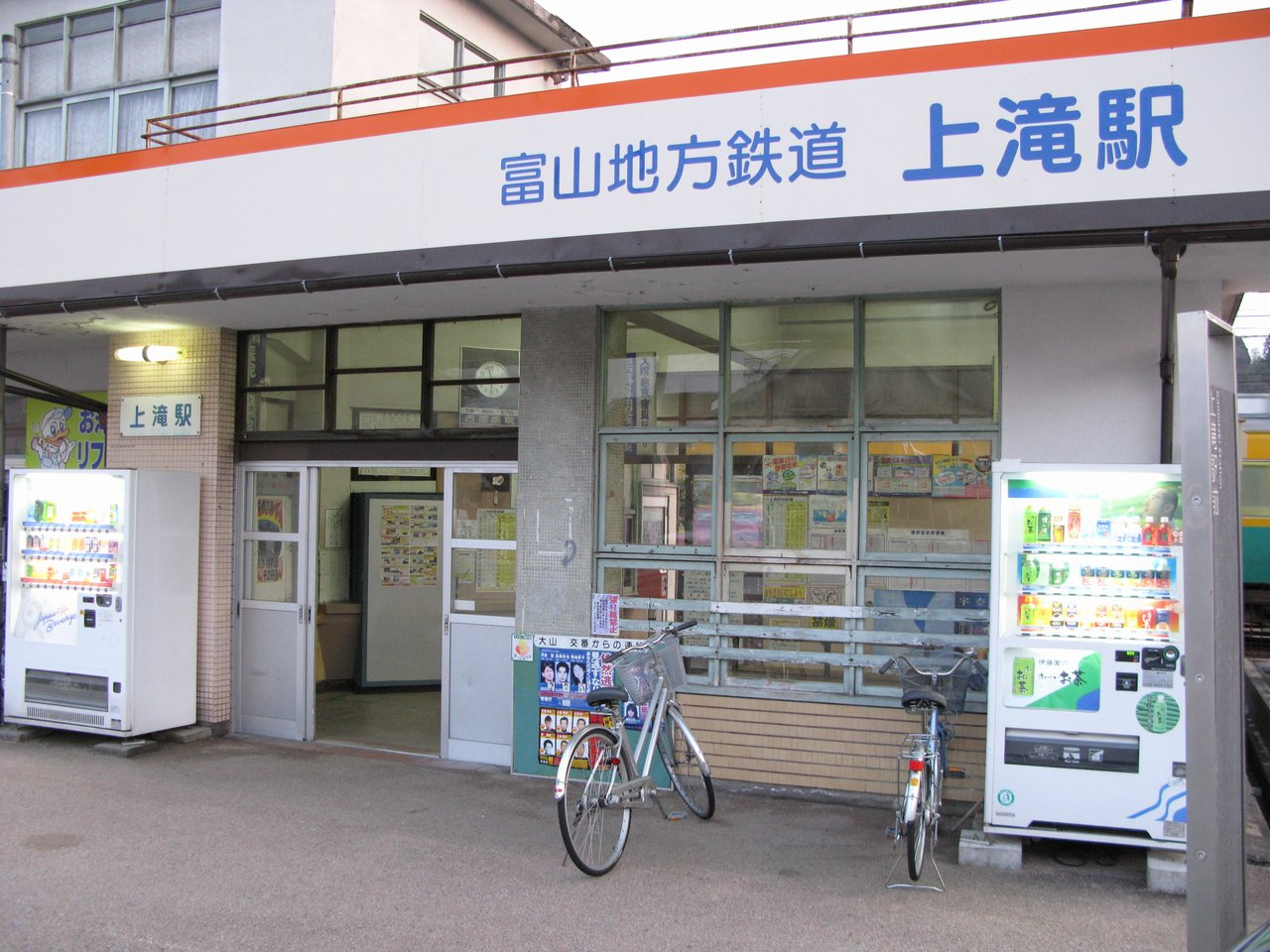
- Kamidaki Station in March 2008

General information
- Location: 260-1 Nakadaki, Toyama-shi Toyama-ken 930-1313; Japan
- Coordinates: 36.6098°N 137.2953°E
- Operator: Toyama Chihō Railway
- Line: ■ Kamidaki Line
- Distance: 10.1 km from Minami-Toyama
- Platforms: 1 side platform
- Tracks: 1

Other information
- Status: Staffed (weekdays)
- Website: Official website

History
- Opened: 25 April 1921

Passengers
- FY2015: 347 daily
Location
- Location within Japan

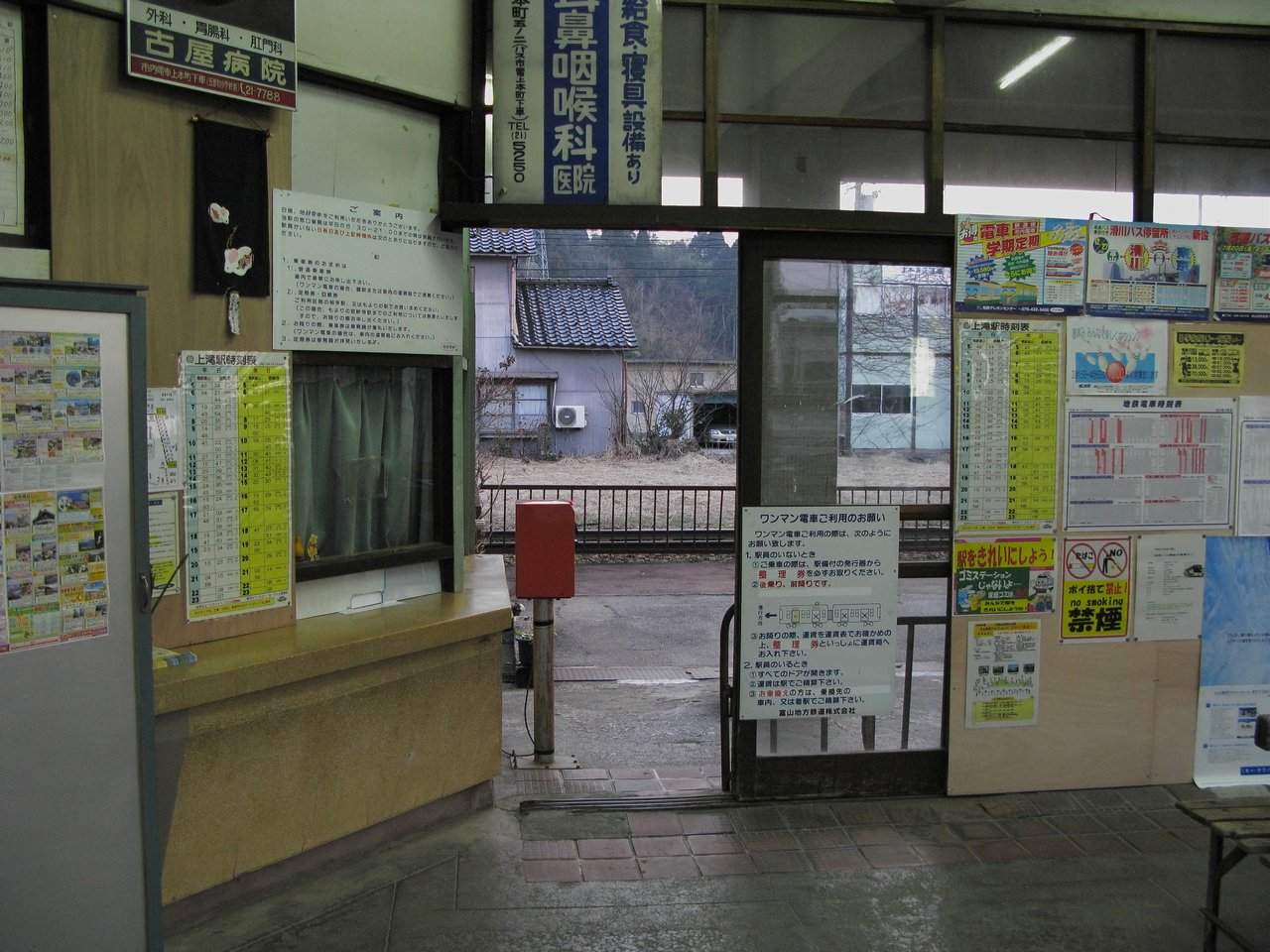
Station interior

Kamidaki Station (上滝駅, Kamidaki-eki) is a railway station on the Toyama Chihō Railway Kamidaki Line in the city of Toyama, Toyama Prefecture, Japan, operated by the private railway operator Toyama Chihō Railway.

== General Information ==
- Location: 260-1 Nakadaki, Toyama-shi, Toyama-ken 930-1313, Japan
- Coordinates: 36.6098°N, 137.2953°E
- Operator: Toyama Chihō Railway
- Line: Kamidaki Line
- Distance: 10.1 km from Minami-Toyama

== Lines ==
Kamidaki Station is served by the Toyama Chihō Railway Kamidaki Line and is 10.1 kilometers from the starting point of the line at Minami-Toyama.

== Station layout ==
- Platform: One ground-level side platform serving a single bi-directional track.
- Staffing: The station is staffed on weekdays but unattended on weekends.

== Adjacent stations ==
«	Service	»
Toyama Chihō Railway Kamidaki Line
Ōshō	-	Daisenji

== History ==
Kamidaki Station opened on 25 April 1921.

== Passenger statistics ==
In fiscal 2015, the station was used by 347 passengers daily.

== Surrounding area ==
- Former Oyama Town Hall
- Kamidaki Junior High School

== See also ==
- List of railway stations in Japan
