= Asanamachi Station =

Railway station in Toyama, Toyama Prefecture, Japan

Asanamachi Station 朝菜町駅
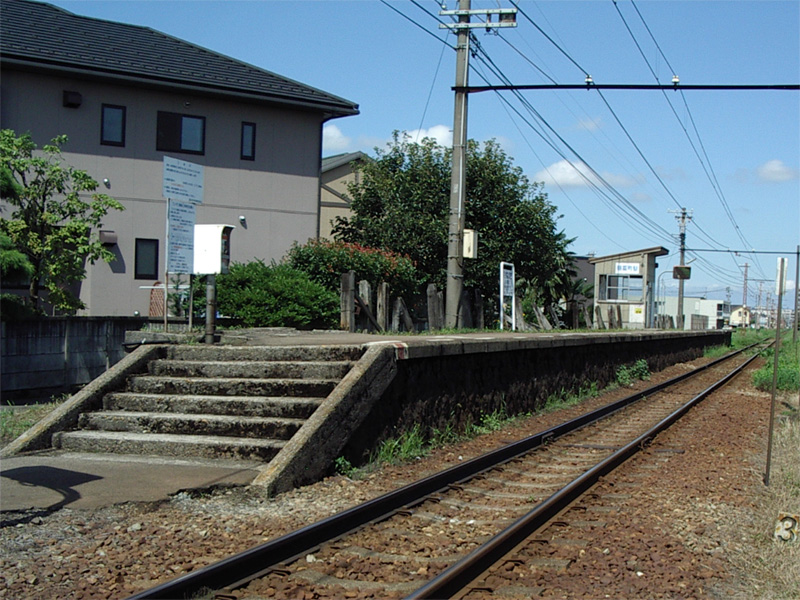
- Asanamachi Station in August 2008

General information
- Location: 13-13 Horikawamachi, Toyama-shi Toyama-ken 939-8072; Japan
- Coordinates: 36.6607°N 137.2246°E
- Operator: Toyama Chihō Railway
- Line: ■ Kamidaki Line
- Distance: 1.3 from Minami-Toyama
- Platforms: 1 side platform
- Tracks: 1

Other information
- Status: Unstaffed
- Website: Official website

History
- Opened: 25 April 1958

Passengers
- FY2015: 50
Location
- Location within Japan

Asanamachi Station (朝菜町駅, Asanamachi-eki) is a railway station in the city of Toyama, Toyama Prefecture, Japan, operated by the private railway operator Toyama Chihō Railway.

== Lines ==
Ōizumi Station is served by the Toyama Chihō Railway Kamidaki Line, and is 1.3 kilometers from the starting point of the line at Minami-Toyama.

== Station layout ==
The station has one ground-level side platform serving a single bi-directional track. The station is unattended.

== History ==
Asanamachi Station was opened on 25 April 1958.

== Adjacent stations ==
«	Service	»
Toyama Chihō Railway Kamidaki Line
Minami-Toyama	-	Kamihori

== Surrounding area ==
- Toyama Horikawa Minami Elementary School

== See also ==
- List of railway stations in Japan
