= Minami-Toyama Station =

Railway station in Toyama, Toyama Prefecture, Japan

Minami-Toyama Station 南富山駅
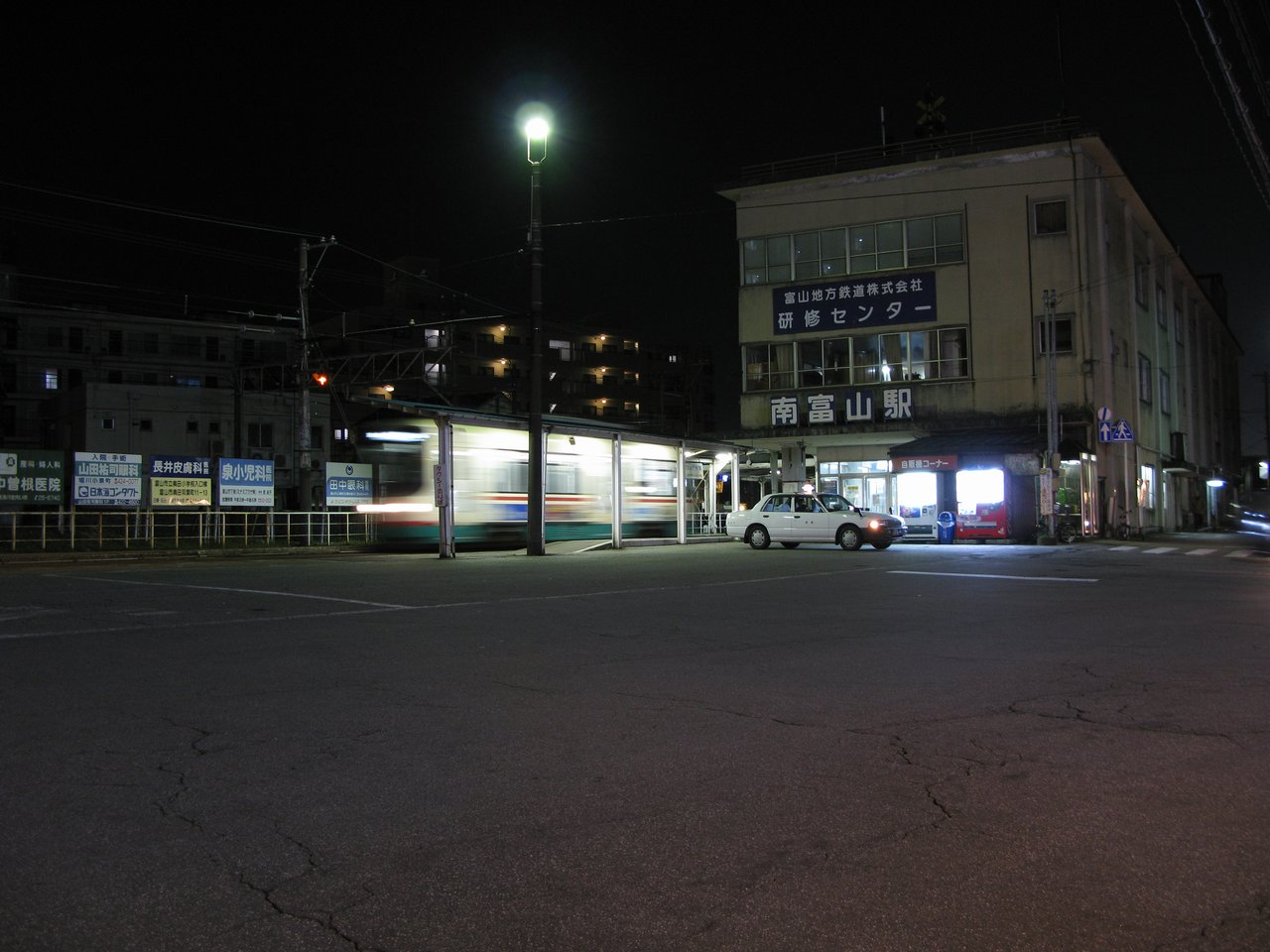
- Minami-Toyama Station in March 2008

General information
- Location: 217-8 Omachi, Toyama-shi, Toyama-ken 939-8073; Japan
- Coordinates: 36.6705°N 137.2206°E
- Operator: Toyama Chihō Railway
- Lines: ■ Fujikoshi Line; ■ Kamidaki Line
- Distance: 3.3 km from Inarimachi
- Platforms: 1 island platform
- Tracks: 2

Other information
- Status: Staffed
- Website: Official website

History
- Opened: 6 December 1914

Passengers
- FY2015: 673
Location
- Location within Japan

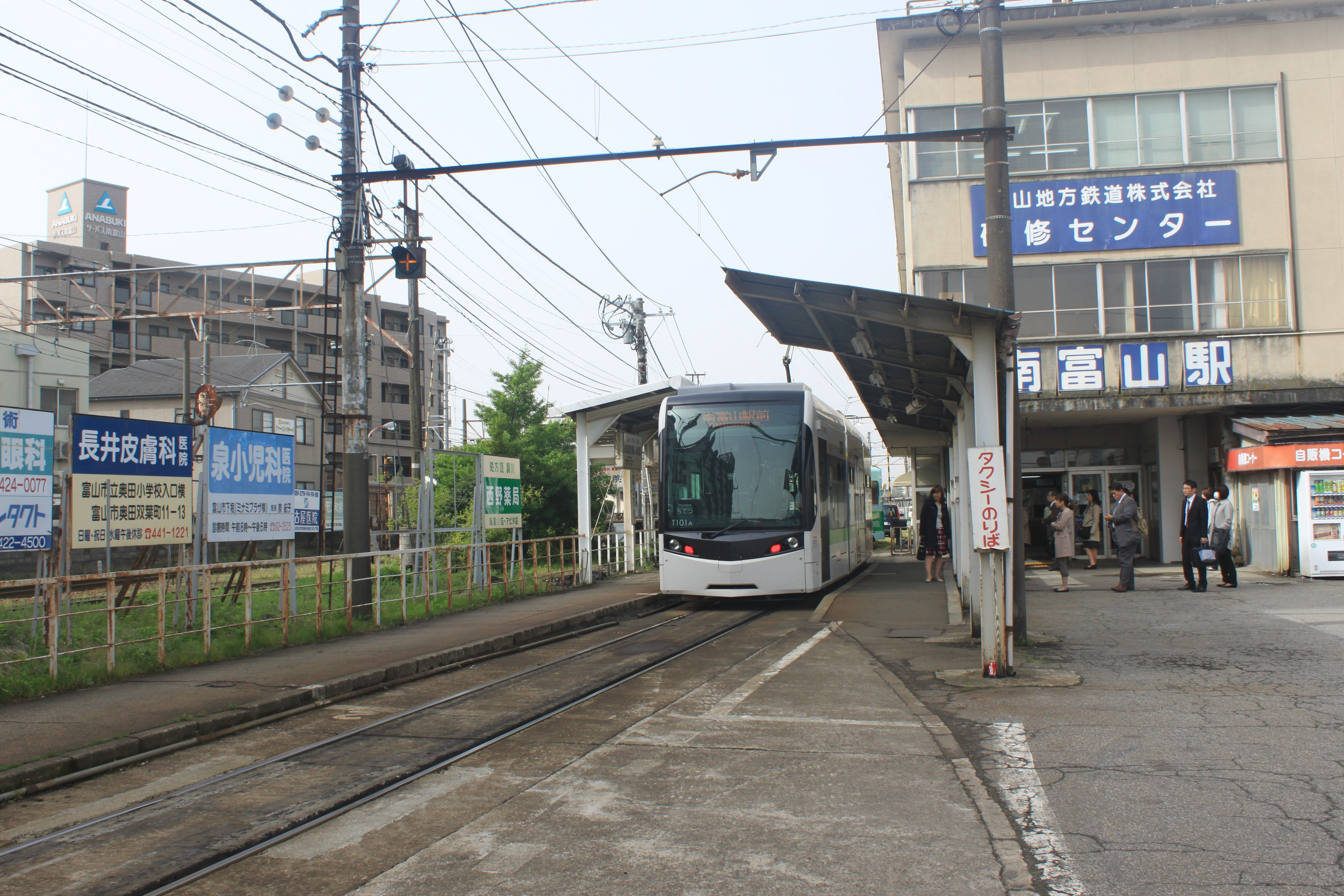
Minami-Toyama City Tram Line station

Minami-Toyama Station (南富山駅, Minami-Toyama-eki) is a railway station in the city of Toyama, Toyama Prefecture, Japan, operated by the private railway operator Toyama Chihō Railway.

== Lines ==
Minami-Toyama Station is the junction station of the Fujikoshi Line with the Kamidaki Line, and is 3.3 kilometers from the starting point of the Fujikoshi Line at Inarimachi. It is also the terminal station for Line 2 of the Toyama City Tram Line.

== Station layout ==
The station has one ground-level island platform serving the Fujikoshi Line and two ground-level opposed side platforms serving the Toyama City Tram Line, of which only one side is in operation. The station is staffed.

=== Platforms ===
1	■ Toyama Chihō Railway Fujikoshi Line	■ for Inarimachi, Toyama
2	■ Toyama Chihō Railway Kamidaki Line	■ for Kamidaki, Iwakuraji

== History ==
Minami-Toyama Station was opened on 6 December 1914 as Horikawa Station (堀川新駅). It was renamed to its present name on 25 April 1921.

== Adjacent stations ==
«	Service	»
Toyama Chihō Railway Fujikoshi-Kamidaki Line
Ōizumi	-	Asanamachi

== Passenger statistics ==
In fiscal 2015, the Toyama Chihō Railway portion of the station was used by 673 passengers daily.

== Surrounding area ==
- Horikawa Junior High School

== See also ==
- List of railway stations in Japan
