= Tateyama Sabō Erosion Control Works Service Train =

Japanese industrial railway line

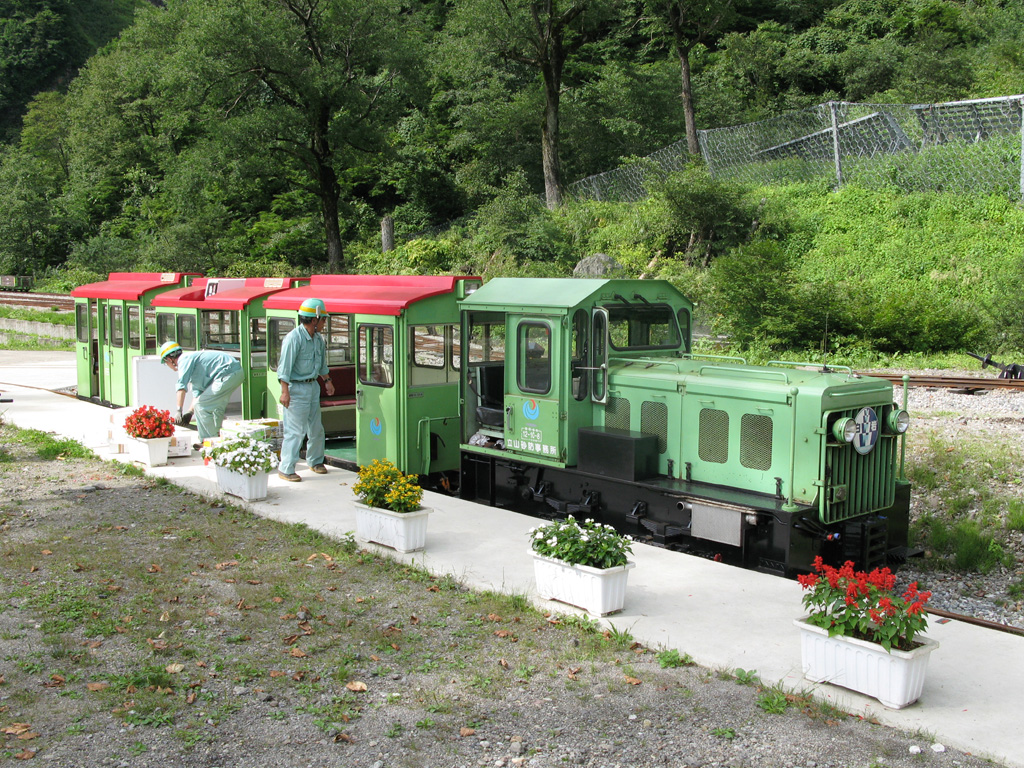
A train at Mizutani Liaison Office in September 2007

The Tateyama Sabō Erosion Control Works Service Train (立山砂防工事専用軌道, Tateyama Sabō Kōji Sen'yō Kidō), commonly called Tateyama Erosion Control Train (立山砂防軌道, Tateyama Sabō Kidō), is a Japanese, 2 ft (610 mm) narrow gauge industrial railway line in Tateyama, Toyama. It is operated by the Tateyama Mountain Area Sabō Office, which belongs to the Hokuriku Regional Development Bureau of the Ministry of Land, Infrastructure and Transport.

== Overview ==
The line transports materials and workers for the construction/conservation of erosion control facilities of Jōganji River, such as dams. Unlike ordinary railways in Japan, the line is not regulated by the Railway Business Law nor the Tram Law, but by the Industrial Safety and Health Law. It means the line is not a public transportation, but solely a construction facility. However, the line is well known among railfans. This is one of few Japanese railways, or possibly the only surviving one, to use 2 ft (610 mm) narrow gauge track. Also, it is one of the lines with the largest number of railway zig zags in the world. Because of its historical significance, the line is registered as a Monument of Japan.

== History ==
Jōganji River, flowing from the Tateyama Mountains to the Toyama Bay, was known as a river with frequent floods and debris flows. In 1926, the Home Ministry started to construct erosion control facilities for the river, including the railway line. The narrow gauge railway line between Senjugahara and Kanbadaira opened in 1929. A funicular was built between Kanbadaira and Mizutani in 1930, and a railway between Mizutani and Shiroiwa in the next year. The rail system stopped its operation during 1944 and 1948, because of World War II. During that period the funicular section collapsed and an aerial lift for the same section was built in 1951. In 1965, the same section was replaced by a normal railway, with 18 zig zags in a row. The whole route between Senjugahara and Shiroishi became a single railway line. The section between Mizutani and Shiroishi was later abandoned, and the line now operates between Senjugahara and Mizutani. During 1998 and 2007, the line was renovated with newer routes (tunnels), reducing railway zig zags.

== Basic data ==
- Distance: 18 km (11 mi)
- Gauge: 2 ft (610 mm) (the line is the only known surviving Japanese railway to use this gauge)
- Rails: 15 kg/m
- Maximum speed: 18 km/h (uphill), 15 km/h (downhill)
- Vertical interval: 640 m (2,100 ft)
- Liaison offices: 6
- Double-track line: None
- Electric supply: Not electrified
- Average gradient: 3.5 %
- Maximum gradient: 5.0 %
- Tunnels: 12
- Bridges: 20
- Railway zig zags: 38, concentrated in 8 places
  - Until 2005, there were 42 railway zig zags concentrated in 9 places.

== Liaison offices ==
Six liaison offices (equivalent to stations) are located in Tateyama, Toyama:

- Senjugahara (千寿ヶ原): Near Tateyama Station of Toyama Chihō Railway Tateyama Line and Tateyama Cable Car. Altitude 475 m (1,558 ft).
- Nakagoya (中小屋)
- Kuwadani (桑谷)
- Onigajō (鬼ヶ城)
- Kanbadaira (樺平)
- Mizutani (水谷): Altitude 1,117 m (3,665 ft).

== Rolling stock ==
Equipment roster as of May 2006.

- Diesel locomotives: 9
- Work trains: 4
- Passenger cars: 16
- Freight cars: 104

== Services ==
Normally, a diesel locomotive tows 3 cars. The service is fairly frequent. The whole uphill trip takes 1 hour and 45 minutes. Since the area has heavy snowfalls in winter, the line closes from mid-November till June. In winter, some bridges and fences are removed to prevent their destruction by snow.

The line is normally closed to the public. However, from 1984, a study tour of the erosion control started to use the line to transport its participants. Nonetheless, railfans still find it difficult to ride the line, since they have to book in advance and win a lottery to join the tour, which is often cancelled due to bad weather. In 2006, 16 tours were planned per day with 720 participants in total. Applications were 1.83 to 5.55 times more than the places available, and 69% of the planned tours were executed in reality.

== See also ==
- Kurobe Senyō Railway
- Tateyama Cable Car
- Industrial railway
