= Yokoe =

Yokoe (Japanese: 横江) is a Japanese surname. Notable people with the surname include:

- Kaneo Yokoe (横江 金夫, 1934–2025), Japanese politician
- Ryuji Yokoe (横江 竜司, born 1978), Japanese motorcycle racer

== Other uses ==
- Yokoe Station, a railway station in the Japanese town of Tateyama
- Tōdai-ji Yokoe Shōen, an archaeological site in the Japanese Hokuriku region
