= Enokimachi Station =

Railway station in Tateyama, Toyama Prefecture, Japan

Enokimachi Station 榎町駅
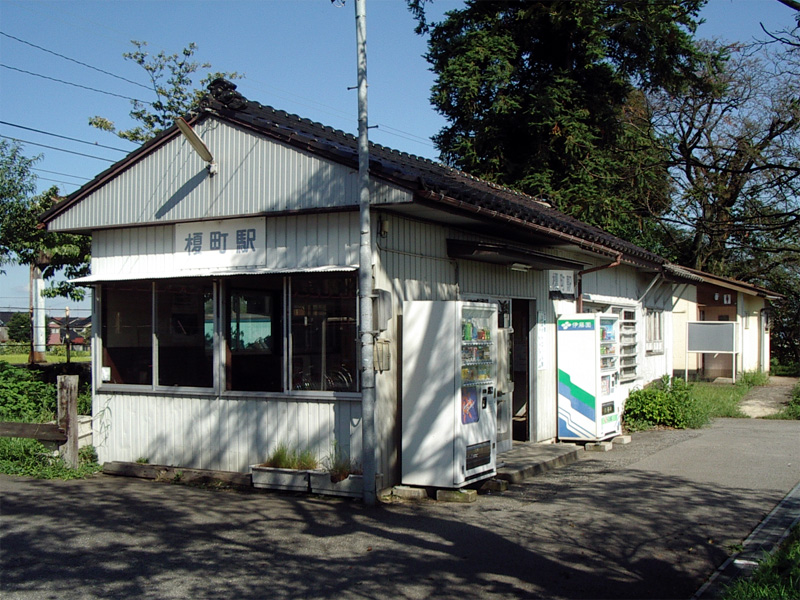
- Enokimachi Station in August 2006

General information
- Location: 2879-2 Maezawa, Tateyama-machi, Nakaniikawa-gun Toyama-ken 930-0221; Japan
- Coordinates: 36.6577°N 137.3163°E
- Operator: Toyama Chihō Railway
- Line: ■ Tateyama Line
- Distance: 4.6 from Terada
- Platforms: 1 side platform
- Tracks: 1

Other information
- Status: Staffed (weekday AM only)
- Website: Official website

History
- Opened: 19 March 1921
Location
- Location within Japan

Enokimachi Station (榎町駅, Enokimachi-eki) is a railway station in the town of Tateyama, Toyama, Japan, operated by the private railway operator Toyama Chihō Railway.

== Lines ==
Enokimachi Station is served by the Toyama Chihō Railway Tateyama Line, and is 4.6 kilometers from the starting point of the line at Terada.

== Station layout ==
The station has one ground-level side platform serving a single bi-directional track. The station is staffed only on weekday mornings.

== History ==
Enokimachi Station was opened on 19 March 1921.

== Adjacent stations ==
«	Service	»
Toyama Chihō Railway Tateyama Line
Limited Express: Does not stop at this station
Gohyakkoku	Express	Kamagafuchi
Gohyakkoku	Local	Shitadan

== Surrounding area ==
- Tateyama Chuo Elementary School
- Tateyama Junior High School

== See also ==
- List of railway stations in Japan
