= Shitadan Station =

Railway station in Tateyama, Toyama Prefecture, Japan

Shitadan Station 下段駅
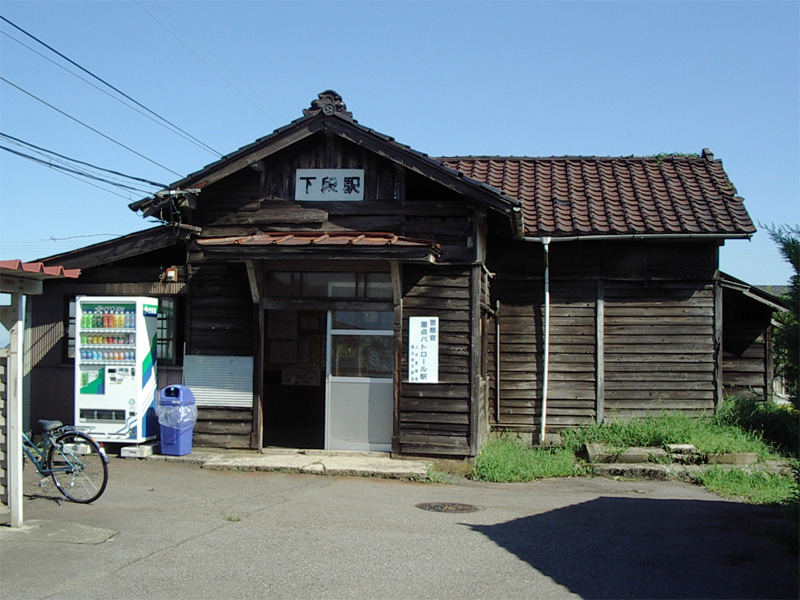
- Shitadan Station in August 2008

General information
- Location: 42-2 Ueki, Tateyama-machi, Nakaniikawa-gun Toyama-ken 930-0235; Japan
- Coordinates: 36.6478°N 137.3179°E
- Operator: Toyama Chihō Railway
- Line: ■ Tateyama Line
- Distance: 5.7 from Terada
- Platforms: 1 side platform
- Tracks: 1

Other information
- Status: Unstaffed
- Website: Official website

History
- Opened: 26 December 1936
Location
- Location within Japan

Shitadan Station (下段駅, Shitadan-eki) is a railway station in the town of Tateyama, Toyama, Japan, operated by the private railway operator Toyama Chihō Railway.

== Lines ==
Shitadan Station is served by the Toyama Chihō Railway Tateyama Line, and is 5.7 kilometers from the starting point of the line at Terada.

== Station layout ==
The station has one ground-level side platform serving a single bi-directional track. The station is unattended.

== History ==
Shitadan Station was opened on 26 December 1936.

== Adjacent stations ==
«	Service	»
Toyama Chihō Railway Tateyama Line
Limited Express: Does not stop at this station
Express: Does not stop at this station
Enokimachi	Local	Kamagafuchi

== Surrounding area ==
- Tateyama Central Gymnasium

== See also ==
- List of railway stations in Japan
