= Sawanakayama Station =

Railway station in Tateyama, Toyama Prefecture, Japan

Sawanakayama Station 沢中山駅
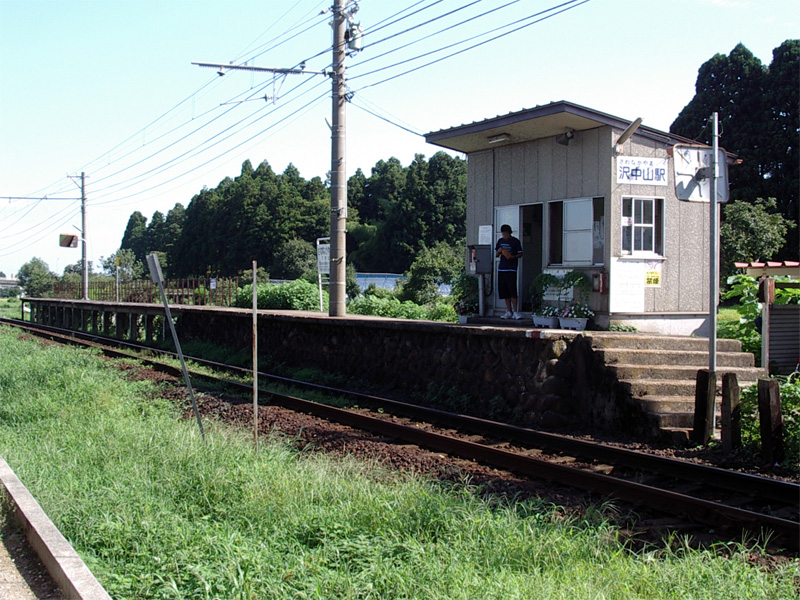
- Sawanakayama Station in August 2008

General information
- Location: 2-2 Iwakuraji, Tateyama-machi, Nakaniikawa-gun Toyama-ken 930-1368; Japan
- Coordinates: 36.6220°N 137.3209°E
- Operator: Toyama Chihō Railway
- Line: ■ Tateyama Line
- Distance: 8.6 from Terada
- Platforms: 1 side platform
- Tracks: 1

Other information
- Status: Unstaffed
- Website: Official website

History
- Opened: 19 March 1921
Location
- Location within Japan

Sawanakayama Station (沢中山駅, Sawanakayama-eki) is a railway station in the town of Tateyama, Toyama, Japan, operated by the private railway operator Toyama Chihō Railway.

== Lines ==
Sawanakayama Station is served by the Toyama Chihō Railway Tateyama Line, and is 8.6 kilometers from the starting point of the line at Terada.

== Station layout ==
The station has one ground-level side platform serving a single bi-directional track. The station is unattended.

== History ==
Sawanakayama Station was opened on 19 March 1921.

== Adjacent stations ==
«	Service	»
Toyama Chihō Railway Tateyama Line
Limited Express: Does not stop at this station
Express: Does not stop at this station
Kamagafuchi	Local	Iwakuraji

== Surrounding area ==
The station is located in a rural area with only a few scattered farmhouses nearby.

== See also ==
- List of railway stations in Japan
