= Chigaki Station =

Railway station in Tateyama, Toyama Prefecture, Japan

Chigaki Station 千垣駅
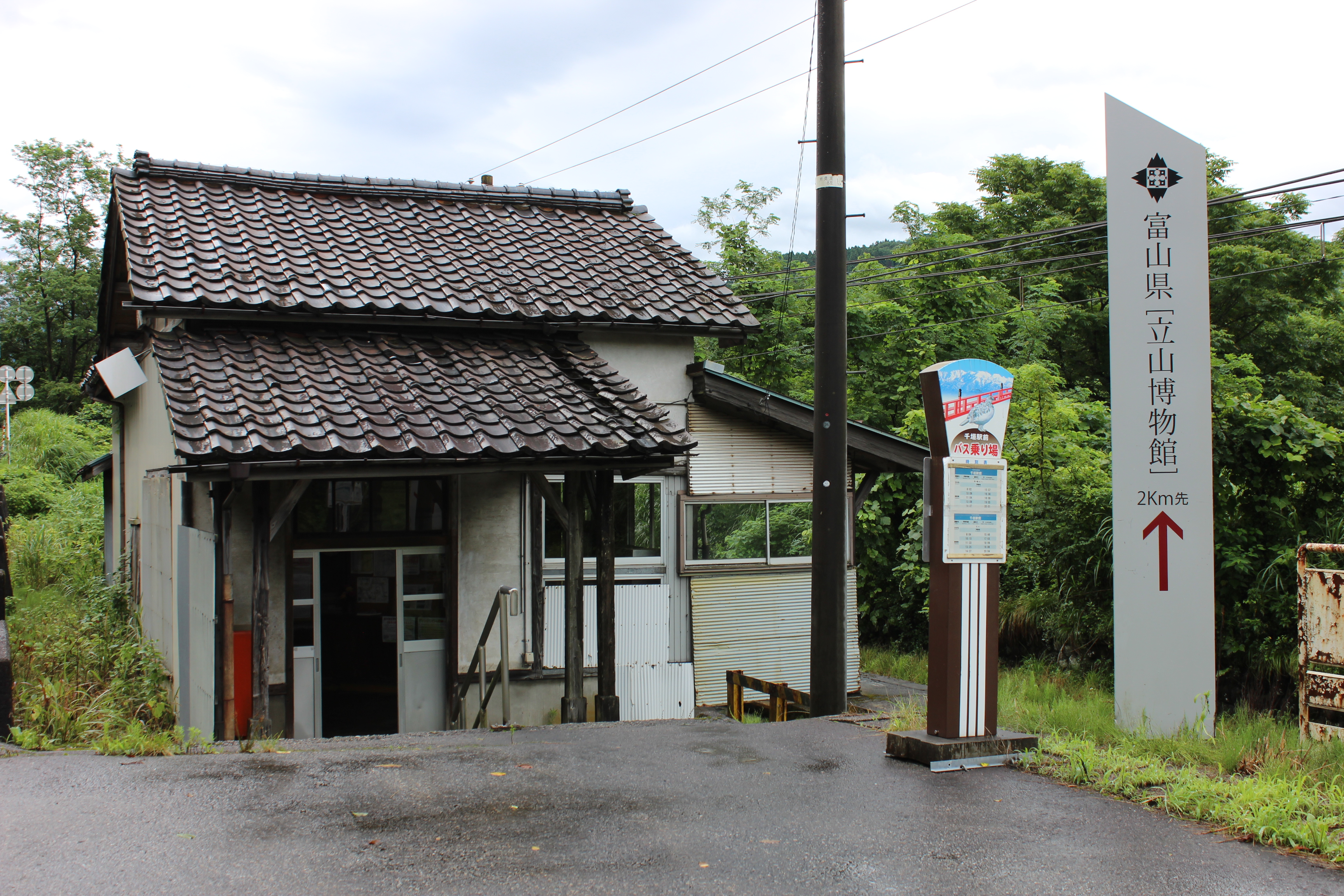
- Chigaki Station in July 2020

General information
- Location: 156 Chigaki, Tateyama-machi, Nakaniikawa-gun Toyama-ken 930-1408; Japan
- Coordinates: 36.5740°N 137.3740°E
- Operator: Toyama Chihō Railway
- Line: ■ Tateyama Line
- Distance: 17.3 from Terada
- Platforms: 1 side platform
- Tracks: 1

Other information
- Status: Unstaffed
- Website: Official website

History
- Opened: 20 April 1923

Passengers
- FY2015: 113
Location
- Location within Japan

Chigaki Station (千垣駅, Chigaki-eki) is a railway station in the town of Tateyama, Toyama, Japan, operated by the private railway operator Toyama Chihō Railway.

== Lines ==
Chigaki Station is served by the Toyama Chihō Railway Tateyama Line, and is 17.3 kilometers from the starting point of the line at Terada.

== Station layout ==
The station has one ground-level side platform serving a single bi-directional track. The station is unattended.

== History ==
Chigaki Station was opened on 20 April 1923.

== Adjacent stations ==
«	Service	»
Toyama Chihō Railway Tateyama Line
Limited Express: Does not stop at this station
Iwakuraji	Express	Arimineguchi
Yokoe	Local	Arimineguchi

== Surrounding area ==
- Tateyama Museum

== See also ==
- List of railway stations in Japan
