= Iwakuraji Station =

Railway station in Tateyama, Toyama Prefecture, Japan

Iwakuraji Station 岩峅寺駅
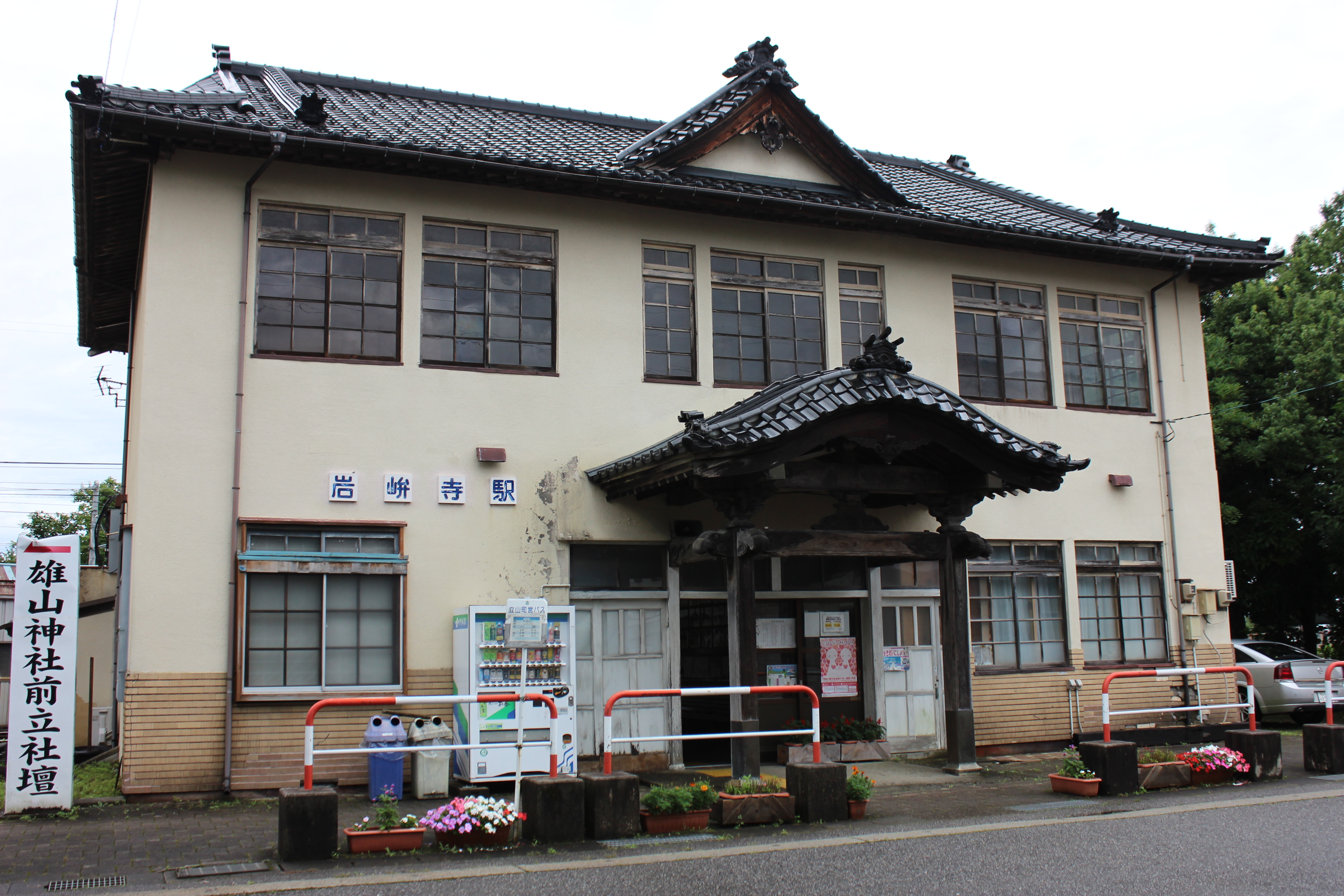
- Iwakuraji Station in July 2020

General information
- Location: 105-4 Iwakuraji, Tateyama-machi, Nakaniikawa-gun Toyama-ken 930-1367; Japan
- Coordinates: 36.6074°N 137.3197°E
- Operator: Toyama Chihō Railway
- Lines: ■ Tateyama Line; ■ Kamidaki Line
- Distance: 10.2 from Terada
- Platforms: 1 side + 1 island platform
- Tracks: 4

Other information
- Status: Staffed
- Website: Official website

History
- Opened: 19 March 1921

Passengers
- FY2015: 402
Location
- Location within Japan

Iwakuraji Station (岩峅寺駅, Iwakuraji-eki) is a railway station in the town of Tateyama, Toyama, Japan, operated by the private railway operator Toyama Chihō Railway.

== Lines ==
Iwakuraji Station is served by the Toyama Chihō Railway Tateyama Line, and is 10.2 kilometers from the starting point of the line at Terada. It is also a station on the Toyama Chihō Railway Kamidaki Line, and is 12.2 kilometers from the terminus of that line at Minami-Toyama

== Station layout ==
The station has one ground-level side platform and one ground-level island platform serving four tracks. The station is staffed.

== History ==
Iwakuraji Station was opened on 19 March 1921 as Tateyama Station (立山駅). It was renamed to its present name on 20 August of the same year.

== Adjacent stations ==
«	Service	»
Toyama Chihō Railway Kamidaki Line
Daisenji	-	Terminus
Toyama Chihō Railway Tateyama Line
Limited Express: Does not stop at this station
Kamagafuchi	Express	Chigaki
Sawanakayama	Local	Yokoe

== Passenger statistics ==
In fiscal 2015, the station was used by 402 passengers daily.

== Surrounding area ==
- Tateyama Green Park Yoshimine

== See also ==
- List of railway stations in Japan
