= Arimineguchi Station =

Railway station in Toyama, Toyama Prefecture, Japan

Arimineguchi Station 有峰口駅
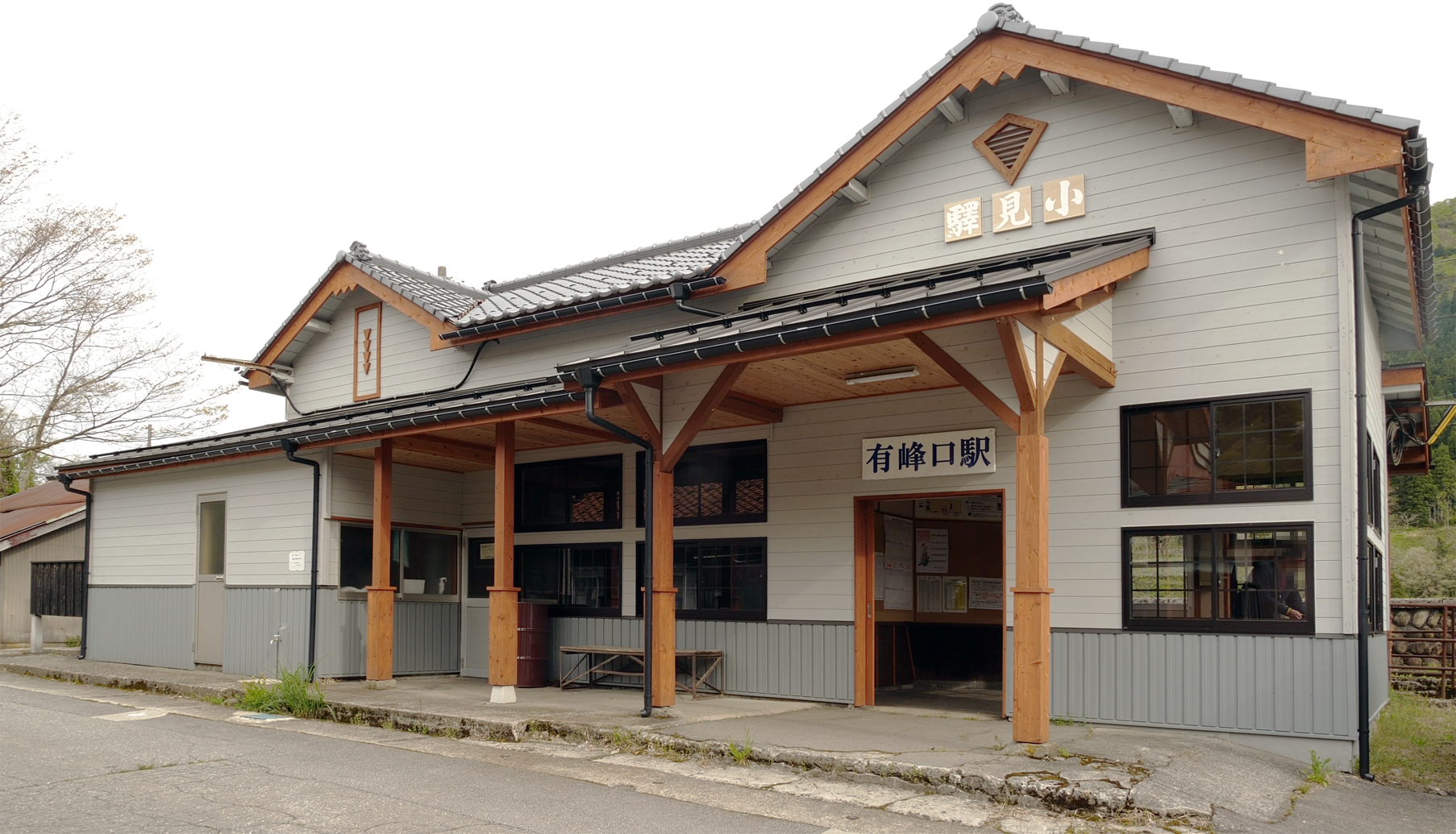
- Arimineguchi Station in 2022

General information
- Location: 362 Omi, Toyama-shi, Toyama-ken 930-1456; Japan
- Coordinates: 36.5733°N 137.3803°E
- Operator: Toyama Chihō Railway
- Line: ■ Tateyama Line
- Distance: 17.9 from Terada
- Platforms: 1 island platform
- Tracks: 2

Other information
- Status: Unstaffed
- Website: Official website

History
- Opened: 1 October 1937
- Rebuilt: 2020
- Former names: Omi (to 1970)

Passengers
- FY2015: 84
Location
- Location within Japan

Arimineguchi Station (有峰口駅, Arimineguchi-eki) is a railway station in the city of Toyama, Toyama Prefecture, Japan, operated by the private railway operator Toyama Chihō Railway.

== Lines ==
Arimineguchi Station is served by the Toyama Chihō Railway Tateyama Line, and is 17.9 kilometers from the starting point of the line at Terada.

== Station layout ==
The station has one ground-level island platform serving two tracks. The station is staffed.

== History ==
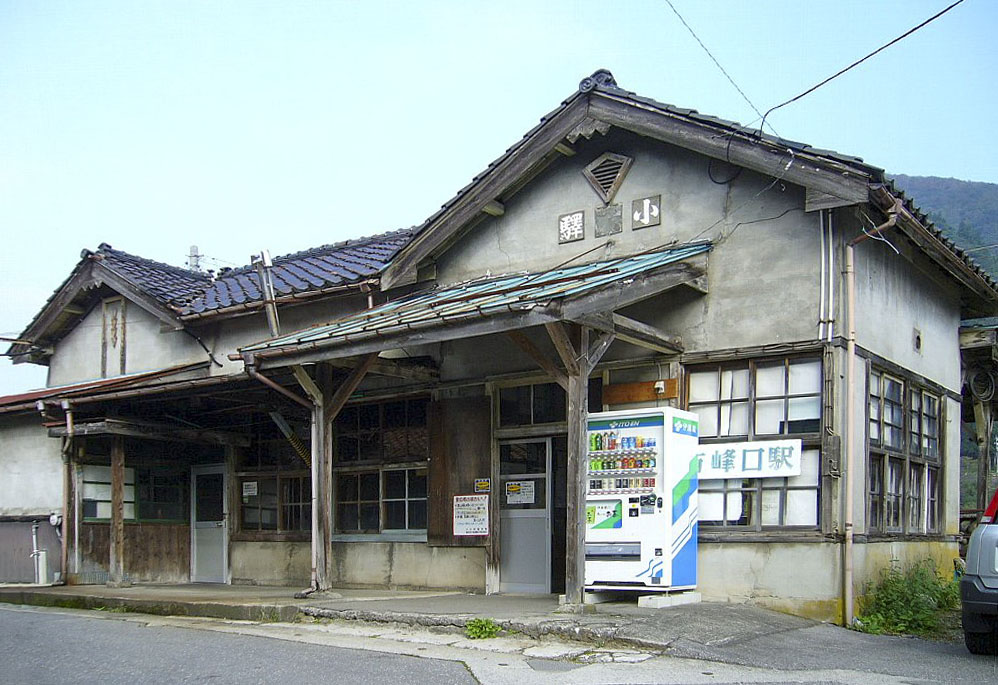
Old Station (in October 2006)

Arimineguchi Station was opened on 1 October 1937 as Omi Station (小見駅). It was renamed to its present name on 1 July 1970.

== Adjacent stations ==
«	Service	»
Toyama Chihō Railway Tateyama Line
Limited Express: Does not stop at this station
Chigaki	Express	Hongū
Chigaki	Local	Hongū

== Passenger statistics ==
In fiscal 2015, the station was used by 84 passengers daily.

== Surrounding area ==
- Omi Elementary School
- Omi Post Office

== See also ==
- List of railway stations in Japan
