= Tazoe Station =

Railway station in Tateyama, Toyama Prefecture, Japan

Tazoe Station 田添駅
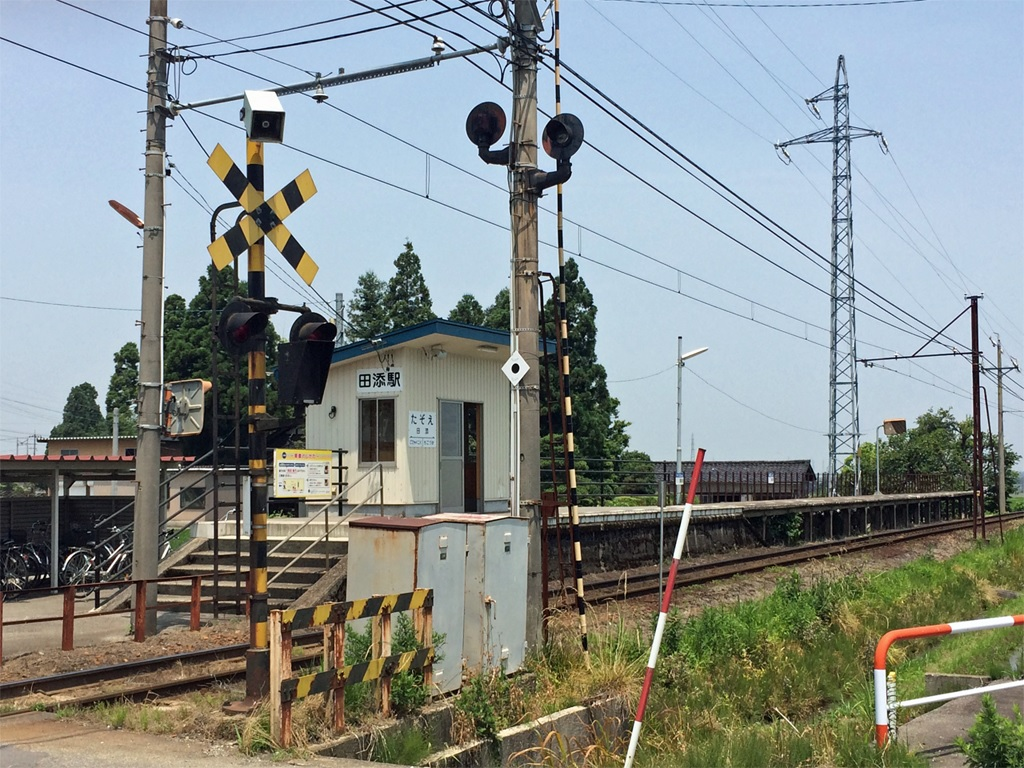
- Tazoe Station in June 2018

General information
- Location: 262-2 Tazoe, Tateyama-machi, Nakaniikawa-gun Toyama-ken 930-0219; Japan
- Coordinates: 36.6800°N 137.3179°E
- Operator: Toyama Chihō Railway
- Line: ■ Tateyama Line
- Distance: 2.1 from Terada
- Platforms: 1 side platform
- Tracks: 1

Other information
- Status: Unstaffed
- Website: Official website

History
- Opened: 15 August 1931
Location
- Location within Japan

Tazoe Station (田添駅, Tazoe-eki) is a railway station in the town of Tateyama, Toyama, Japan, operated by the private railway operator Toyama Chihō Railway.

== Lines ==
Tazoe Station is served by the Toyama Chihō Railway Tateyama Line, and is 2.1 kilometers from the starting point of the line at Terada.

== Station layout ==
The station has one ground-level side platform serving a single bi-directional track. The station is unattended.

== History ==
Tazoe Station was opened on 15 August 1931.

== Adjacent stations ==
«	Service	»
Toyama Chihō Railway Tateyama Line
Limited Express: Does not stop at this station
Express: Does not stop at this station
Chigozuka	Local	Gohyakkoku

== Surrounding area ==
- Hokuriku Expressway Tateyama IC

== See also ==
- List of railway stations in Japan
