= Hongū Station =

Railway station in Toyama, Toyama Prefecture, Japan

Hongū Station 本宮駅
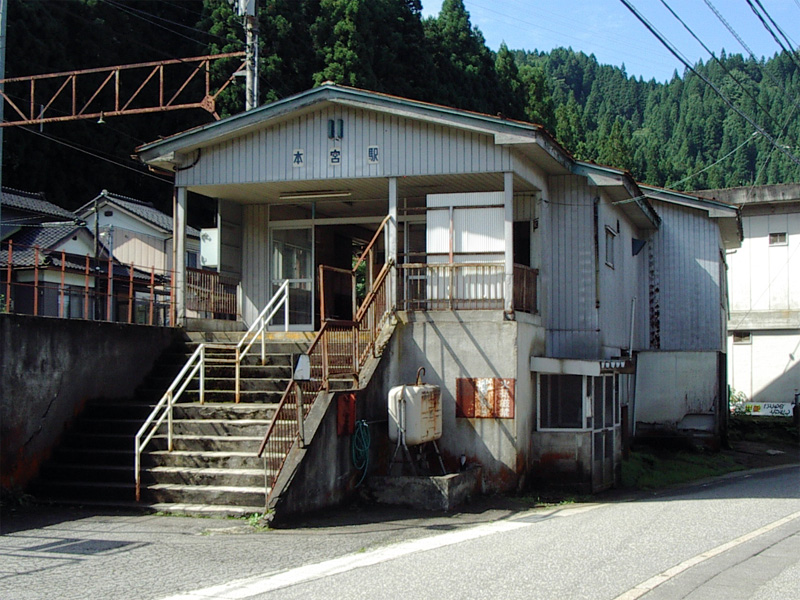
- Hongū Station in August 2008

General information
- Location: Hongū, Toyama-shi, Toyama-ken 930-1455; Japan
- Coordinates: 36.5750°N 137.3957°E
- Operator: Toyama Chihō Railway
- Line: ■ Tateyama Line
- Distance: 19.4 from Terada
- Platforms: 1 side platform
- Tracks: 1

Other information
- Status: Unstaffed
- Website: Official website

History
- Opened: 1 October 1937

Passengers
- FY2015: 13
Location
- Location within Japan

Hongū Station (本宮駅, Hongū-eki) is a railway station in the city of Toyama, Toyama Prefecture, Japan, operated by the private railway operator Toyama Chihō Railway.

== Lines ==
Arimineguchi Station is served by the Toyama Chihō Railway Tateyama Line, and is 19.4 kilometers from the starting point of the line at Terada.

== Station layout ==
The station has one ground-level side platform serving a single bi-directional track.

== History ==
Hongū Station was opened on 1 October 1937.

== Adjacent stations ==
«	Service	»
Toyama Chihō Railway Tateyama Line
Limited Express: Does not stop at this station
Arimineguchi	Express	Tateyama
Arimineguchi	Local	Tateyama

== Surrounding area ==
- Tateyamasanroku ski area
- Gokurakuzaka ski area

== See also ==
- List of railway stations in Japan
