= Kamagafuchi Station =

Railway station in Tateyama, Toyama Prefecture, Japan

Kamagafuchi Station 釜ヶ淵駅
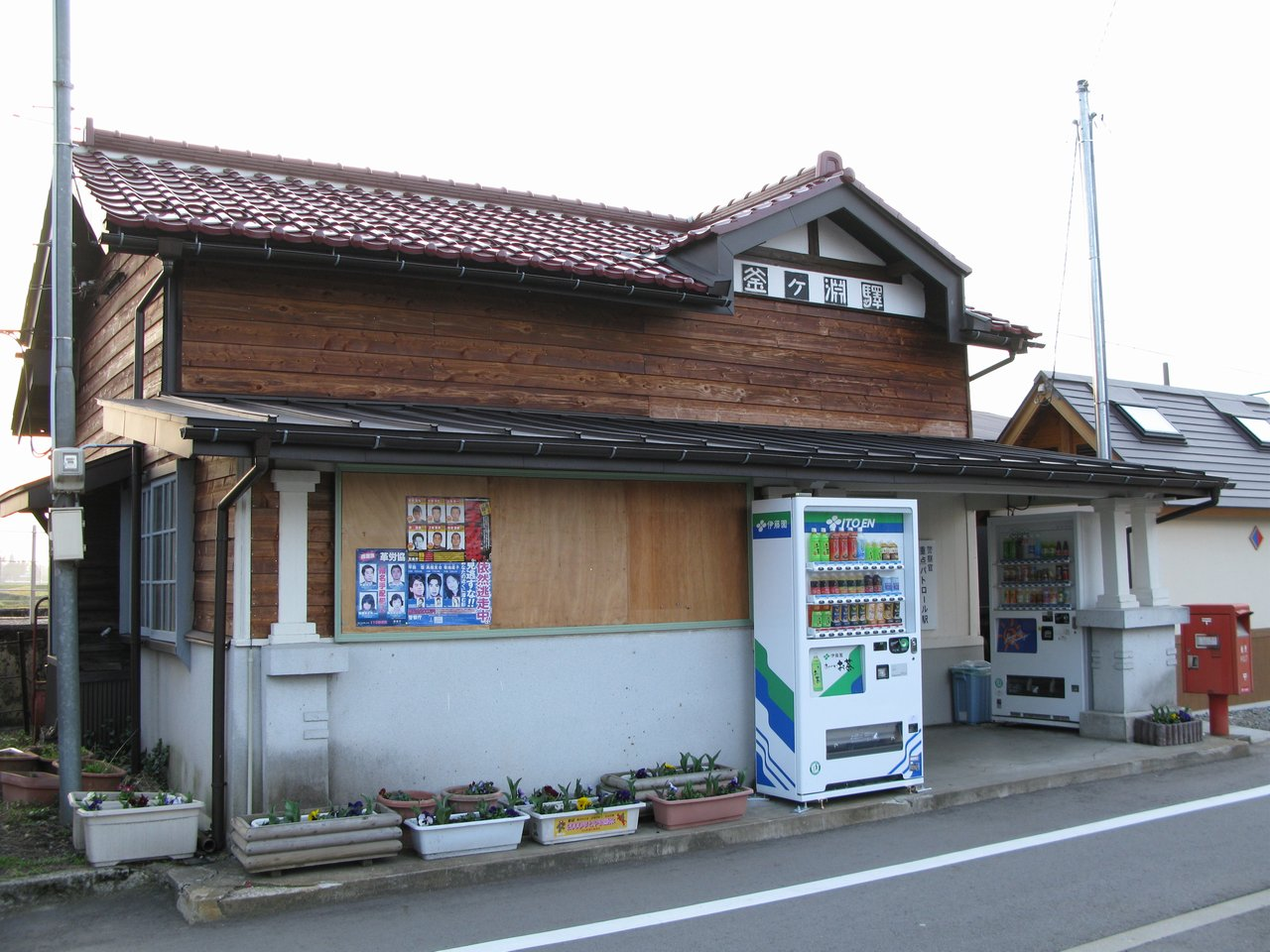
- Kamagafuchi Station in March 2008

General information
- Location: 15-2 Teratsubo, Tateyama-machi, Nakaniikawa-gun Toyama-ken 9930-0241; Japan
- Coordinates: 36.6333°N 137.3193°E
- Operator: Toyama Chihō Railway
- Line: ■ Tateyama Line
- Distance: 7.4 from Terada
- Platforms: 1 side platform
- Tracks: 1

Other information
- Status: Unstaffed
- Website: Official website

History
- Opened: 19 March 1921

Passengers
- FY2015: 236
Location
- Location within Japan

Kamagafuchi Station (釜ヶ淵駅, Kamagafuchi-eki) is a railway station in the town of Tateyama, Toyama, Japan, operated by the private railway operator Toyama Chihō Railway.

== Lines ==
Kamagafuchi Station is served by the Toyama Chihō Railway Tateyama Line, and is 7.4 kilometers from the starting point of the line at Terada.

== Station layout ==
The station has one ground-level side platform serving a single bi-directional track. The station is unattended.

== History ==
Kamagafuchi Station was opened on 19 March 1921.

== Adjacent stations ==
«	Service	»
Toyama Chihō Railway Tateyama Line
Limited Express: Does not stop at this station
Enokimachi	Express	Iwakuraji
Shitadan	Local	Sawanakayama

== Passenger statistics ==
In fiscal 2015, the station was used by 263 passengers daily.

== Surrounding area ==
- Kamagafuchi Elementary School
- Kamagafuchi Post Office

== See also ==
- List of railway stations in Japan
