= Sakaemachi Station (Toyama) =

Railway station in Toyama, Toyama Prefecture, Japan

Sakaemachi Station 栄町駅
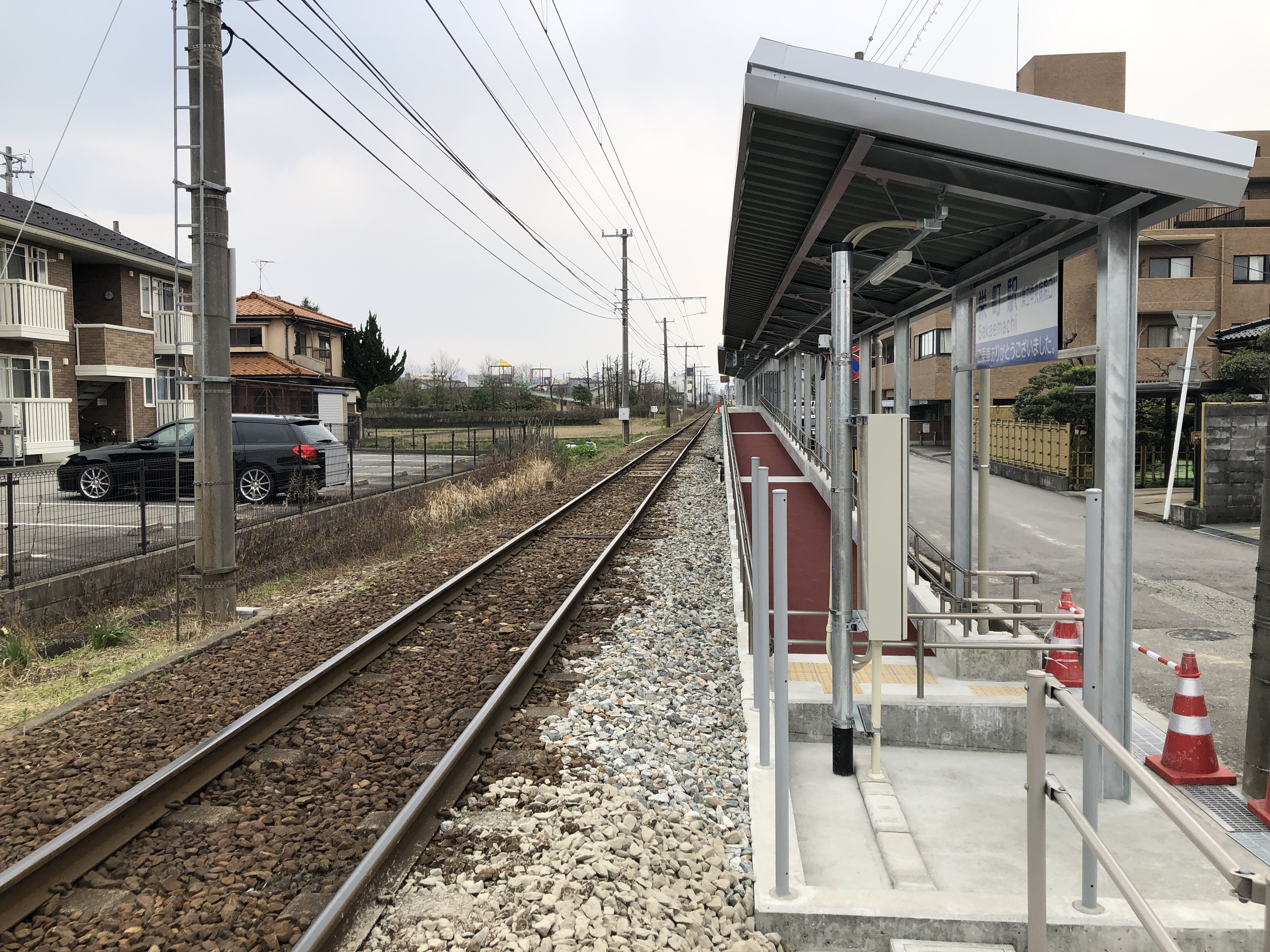
- Sakaemachi Station in March 2019

General information
- Location: 1-3-3 Ishigane, Toyama-shi Toyama-ken （富山県富山市石金1丁目3番3号） Japan
- Coordinates: 36°41′29″N 137°14′0″E
- Operator: Toyama Chihō Railway
- Line: ■ Fujikoshi Line
- Distance: 0.6 from Inarimachi
- Platforms: 1 side platform
- Tracks: 1

Other information
- Status: Unstaffed
- Website: Official website

History
- Opened: 16 March 2019
Location
- Location within Japan

Sakaemachi Station (栄町駅, Sakaemachi-eki) is a railway station in the city of Toyama, Toyama Prefecture, Japan, operated by the private railway operator Toyama Chihō Railway.

== Lines ==
Sakaemachi Station is served by the Toyama Chihō Railway Fujikoshi Line, and is 0.6 kilometers from the starting point of the line at Inarimachi.

== Station layout ==
The station has one ground-level side platform serving a single bi-directional track. The station is unattended.

== History ==
Sakaemachi Station was opened on 16 March 2019.

== Adjacent stations ==
«	Service	»
Toyama Chihō Railway Fujikoshi Line
Inarimachi	-	Fujikoshi

== Surrounding area ==
- Toyama Prefectural Central Hospital
- Toyama Prefectural University (School of Nursing)
- Tōbu branch of Toyama City Public Library
- Toyama City Tōbu Elementary School

== See also ==
- List of railway stations in Japan
