= Bijodaira Station =

Railway station in Tateyama, Toyama prefecture, Japan

Bijodaira 美女平駅
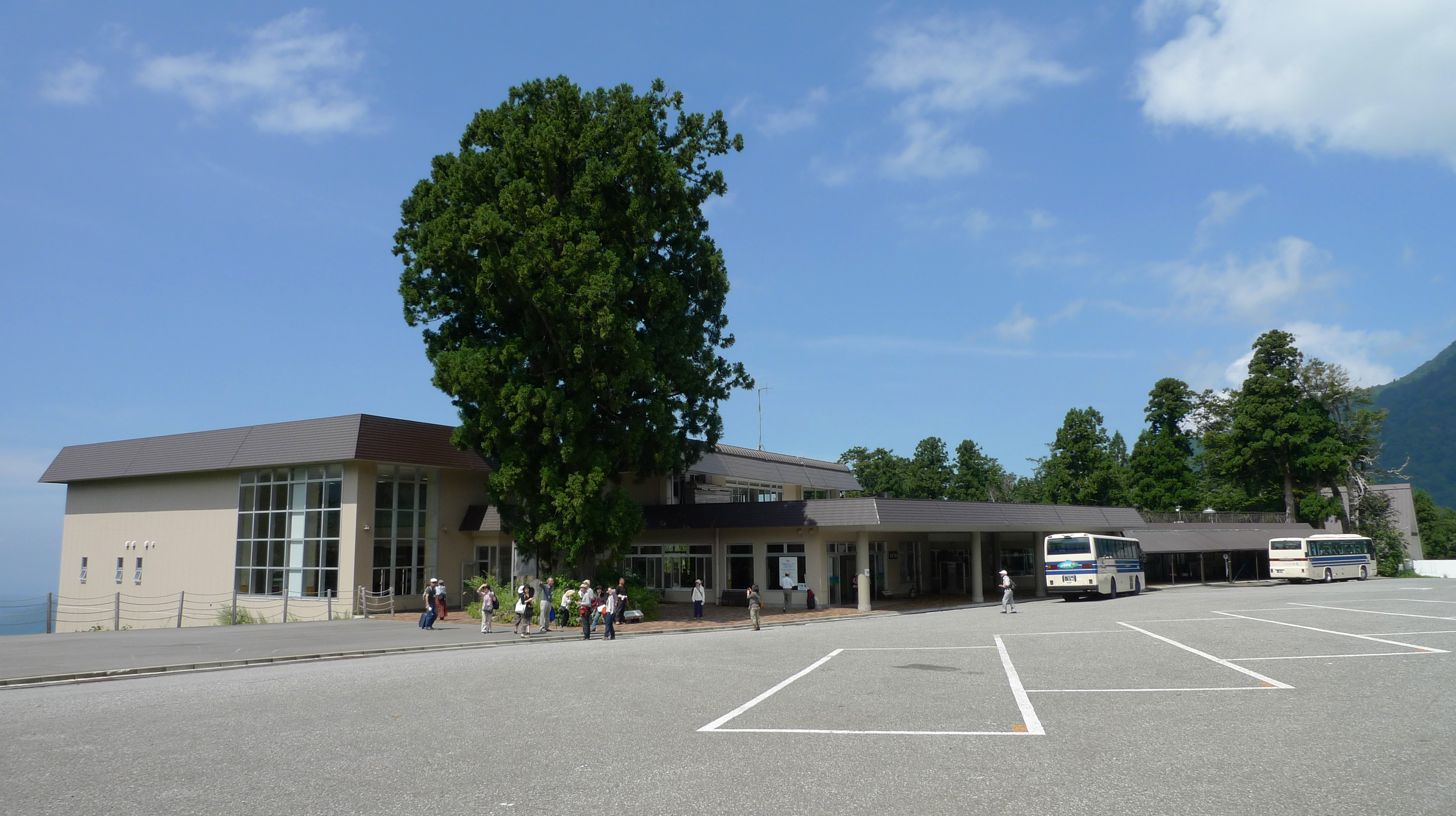

General information
- Location: Japan
- Coordinates: 36.5832792°N 137.4588346°E
- Operator: Tateyama Kurobe Kankō
- Line: Tateyama Cable Car
Location

Bijodaira Station (美女平駅, Bijodaira-eki) is a funicular station in Tateyama, Nakaniikawa District, Toyama Prefecture, Japan.

== Lines ==
- Tateyama Kurobe Kankō
  - Tateyama Cable Car (Tateyama Kurobe Alpine Route)

== Adjacent stations ==
«	Service	»
Tateyama Cable Car
Tateyama	-	Terminus
