= Gohyakkoku Station =

Railway station in Tateyama, Toyama Prefecture, Japan

Gohyakkoku Station 五百石駅
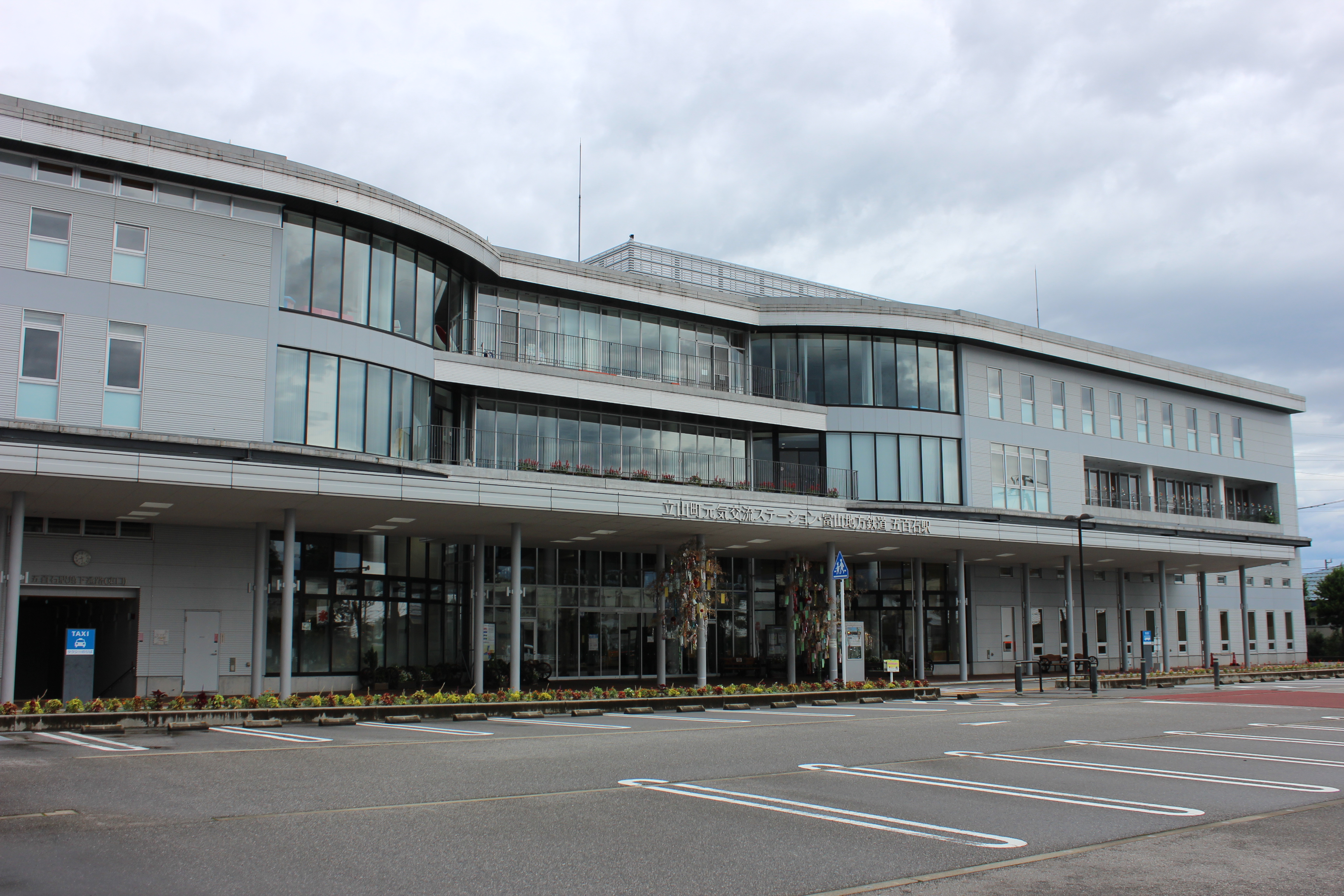
- Gohyakkoku Station in July 2020

General information
- Location: 1172 Maezawa, Tateyama-machi, Nakaniikawa-gun Toyama-ken 930-0221; Japan
- Coordinates: 36°39′55″N 137°18′51″E
- Operator: Toyama Chihō Railway
- Line: ■ Tateyama Line
- Distance: 3.7 from Terada
- Platforms: 2 side platforms
- Tracks: 2

Other information
- Status: Staffed
- Website: Official website

History
- Opened: 25 June 1913
- Rebuilt: 2012
- Former names: Tateyama-machi (1959-1970)

Passengers
- FY2015: 872
Location
- Location within Japan

Gohyakkoku Station (五百石駅, Gohyakkoku-eki) is a railway station in the town of Tateyama, Toyama, Japan, operated by the private railway operator Toyama Chihō Railway.

== Lines ==
Gohyakkoku Station is served by the Toyama Chihō Railway Tateyama Line, and is 3.7 kilometers from the starting point of the line at Terada.

== Station layout ==
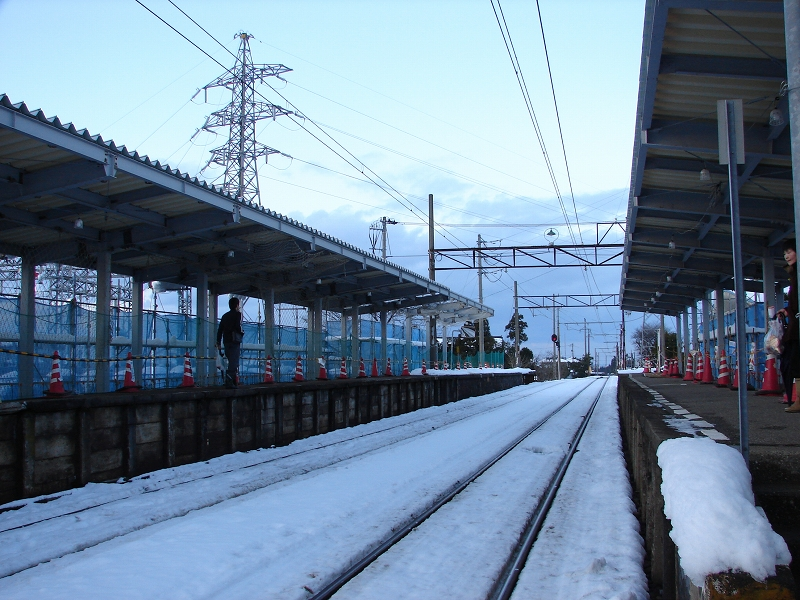
platforms

The station has two ground-level opposed side platforms connected by a level crossing. The station is staffed.

== History ==
Gohyakkoku Station was opened on 25 June 1913. On 1 January 1959 it was renamed Tateyama-machi Station (立山町駅), but was renamed back to its original name on 1 July 1970. A new station building, which includes the town library, opened in 2012.

== Adjacent stations ==
«	Service	»
Toyama Chihō Railway Tateyama Line
Limited Express: Does not stop at this station
Terada	Express	Enokimachi
Tazoe	Local	Enokimachi

== Passenger statistics ==
In fiscal 2015, the station was used by 872 passengers daily.

== Surrounding area ==
- Tateyama Town Hall
- tateyama Post Office

== See also ==
- List of railway stations in Japan
