= Chigozuka Station =

Railway station in Tateyama, Toyama Prefecture, Japan

Chigozuka Station 稚子塚駅
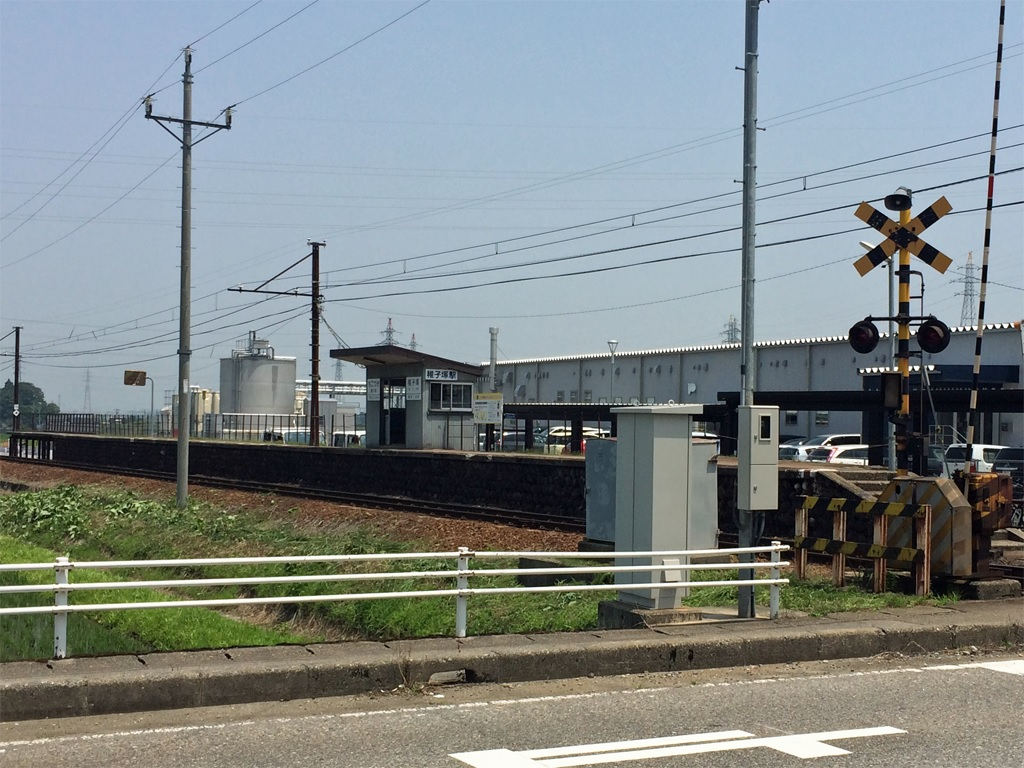
- Chigozuka Station in June 2018

General information
- Location: 1766-4 Urada, Tateyama-machi, Nakaniikawa-gun Toyama-ken 930-0208; Japan
- Coordinates: 36.6868°N 137.3173°E
- Operator: Toyama Chihō Railway
- Line: ■ Tateyama Line
- Distance: 1.4 from Terada
- Platforms: 1 side platform
- Tracks: 1

Other information
- Status: Unstaffed
- Website: Official website

History
- Opened: 15 August 1931
- Former names: Urada (until 1 October 1931)
Location
- Location within Japan

Chigozuka Station (稚子塚駅, Chigozuka-eki) is a railway station in the town of Tateyama, Toyama, Japan, operated by the private railway operator Toyama Chihō Railway.

== Lines ==
Chigozuka Station is served by the Toyama Chihō Railway Tateyama Line, and is 1.4 kilometers from the starting point of the line at Terada.

== Station layout ==
The station has one ground-level side platform serving a single bi-directional track. The station is unattended.

== History ==
The station opened on 15 August 1931 as Urada Station (浦田駅). It was renamed Chigozuka Station on 1 October of the same year.

== Adjacent stations ==
«	Service	»
Toyama Chihō Railway Tateyama Line
Limited Express: Does not stop at this station
Express: Does not stop at this station
Terada	Local	Tazoe

== Surrounding area ==
- Tateyama Hokubu Elementary School
- Chigozuka kofun

== See also ==
- List of railway stations in Japan
