= Yokoe Station =

Railway station in Tateyama, Toyama Prefecture, Japan

Yokoe Station 横江駅
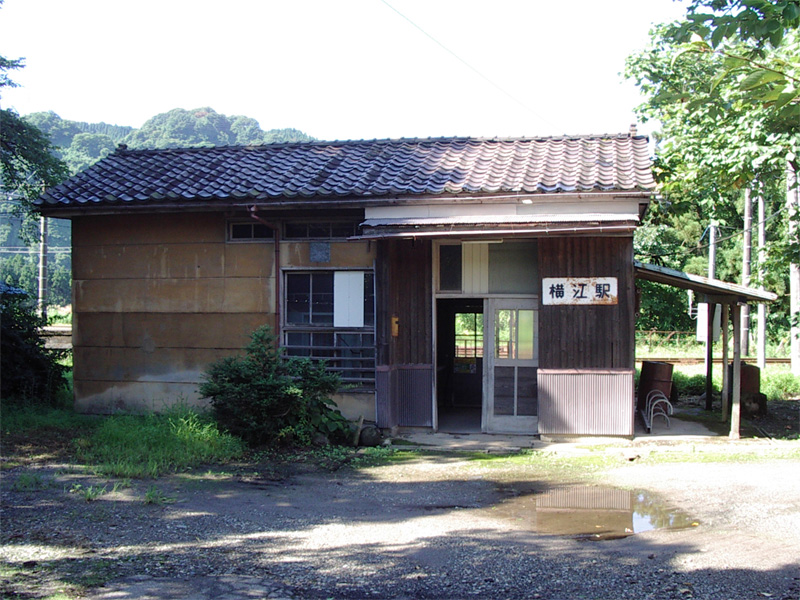
- Yokoe Station in August 2008

General information
- Location: 45 Yokoe, Tateyama-machi, Nakaniikawa-gun Toyama-ken 930-1377; Japan
- Coordinates: 36.5822°N 137.3357°E
- Operator: Toyama Chihō Railway
- Line: ■ Tateyama Line
- Distance: 13.5 from Terada
- Platforms: 1 side platform
- Tracks: 1

Other information
- Status: Unstaffed
- Website: Official website

History
- Opened: 26 December 1936
- Former names: Togariayama (until 1965)
Location
- Location within Japan

Yokoe Station (横江駅, Yokoe-eki) is a railway station in the town of Tateyama, Toyama, Japan, operated by the private railway operator Toyama Chihō Railway.

== Lines ==
Yokoe Station is served by the Toyama Chihō Railway Tateyama Line, and is 13.5 kilometers from the starting point of the line at Terada.

== Station layout ==
The station has one ground-level side platform serving a single bi-directional track. The station is unattended.

== History ==
The station opened on 15 May 1931 as Togariyama Station (尖山駅). It was renamed Yokoe Station on 15 April 1965.

== Adjacent stations ==
«	Service	»
Toyama Chihō Railway Tateyama Line
Limited Express: Does not stop at this station
Express: Does not stop at this station
Iwakuraji	Local	Chigaki

== Surrounding area ==
- Mount Togari

== See also ==
- List of railway stations in Japan
