= Fujikoshi Station =

Railway station in Toyama, Toyama Prefecture, Japan

Fujikoshi Station 不二越駅
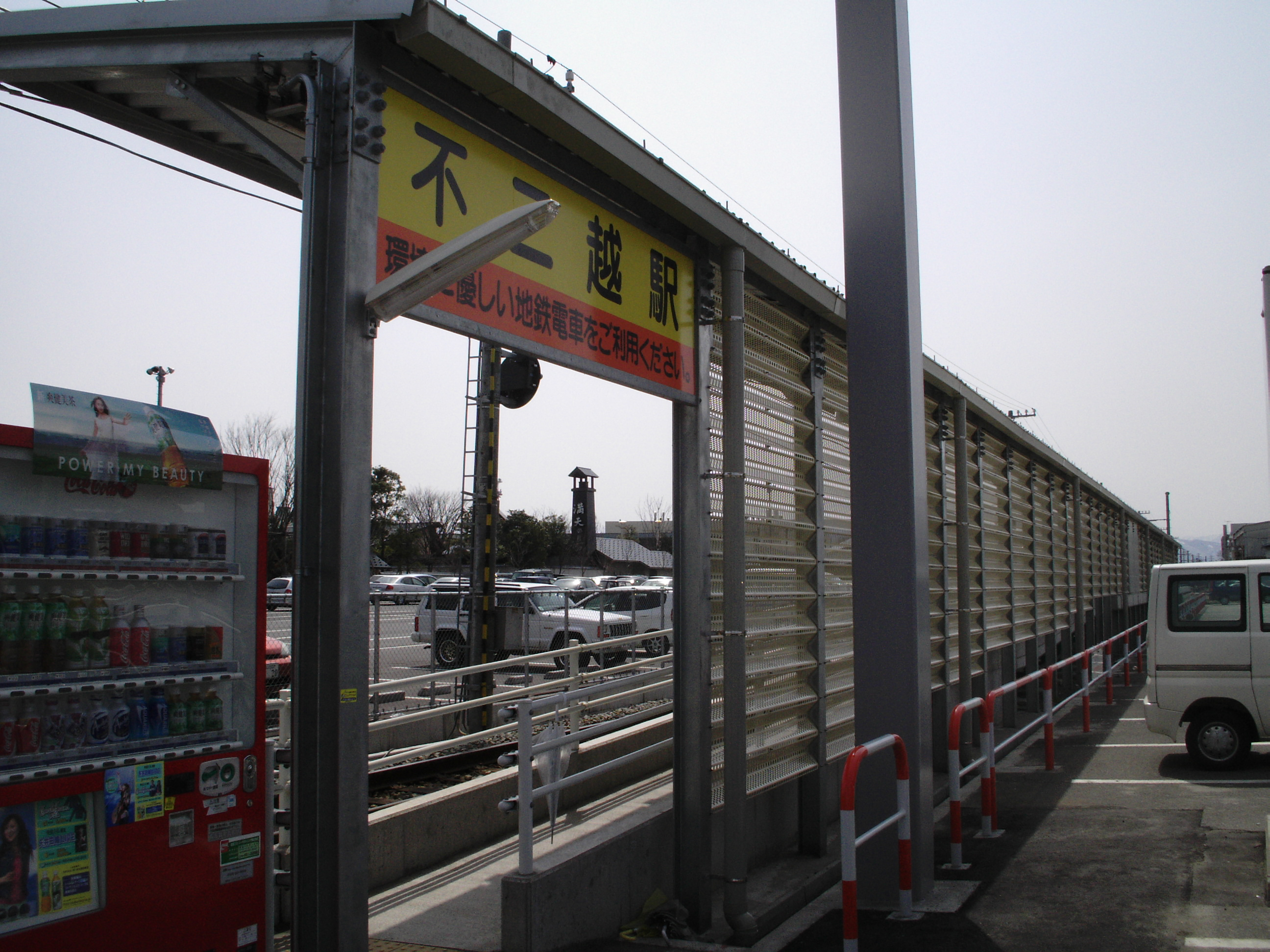
- Fujikoshi Station in April 2006

General information
- Location: 2-1-2 Ishigane, Toyama-shi, Toyama-ken 930-0966; Japan
- Coordinates: 36.6879°N 137.2326°E
- Operator: Toyama Chihō Railway
- Line: ■ Fujikoshi Line
- Distance: 1.0 from Inarimachi
- Platforms: 1 side platform
- Tracks: 1

Other information
- Status: Staffed (weekday AM only)
- Website: Official website

History
- Opened: 6 December 1914

Passengers
- FY2015: 407
Location
- Location within Japan

Fujikoshi Station (不二越駅, Fujikoshi-eki) is a railway station in the city of Toyama, Toyama Prefecture, Japan, operated by the private railway operator Toyama Chihō Railway.

== Lines ==
Fujikoshi Station is served by the Toyama Chihō Railway Fujikoshi Line, and is 1.0 kilometers from the starting point of the line at Inarimachi.

== Station layout ==
The station has one ground-level side platform serving a single bi-directional track. The station is staffed during weekday mornings only.

== History ==
Fujikoshi Station was opened on 6 December 1914.

== Adjacent stations ==
«	Service	»
Toyama Chihō Railway Fujikoshi Line
Sakaemachi	-	Ōizumi

== Passenger statistics ==
In fiscal 2015, the station was used by 407 passengers daily.

== Surrounding area ==
- Nachi-Fujikoshi head office

== See also ==
- List of railway stations in Japan
