= Tateyama Station (Toyama) =

Railway station in Tateyama, Toyama Prefecture, Japan

Tateyama Station 立山駅
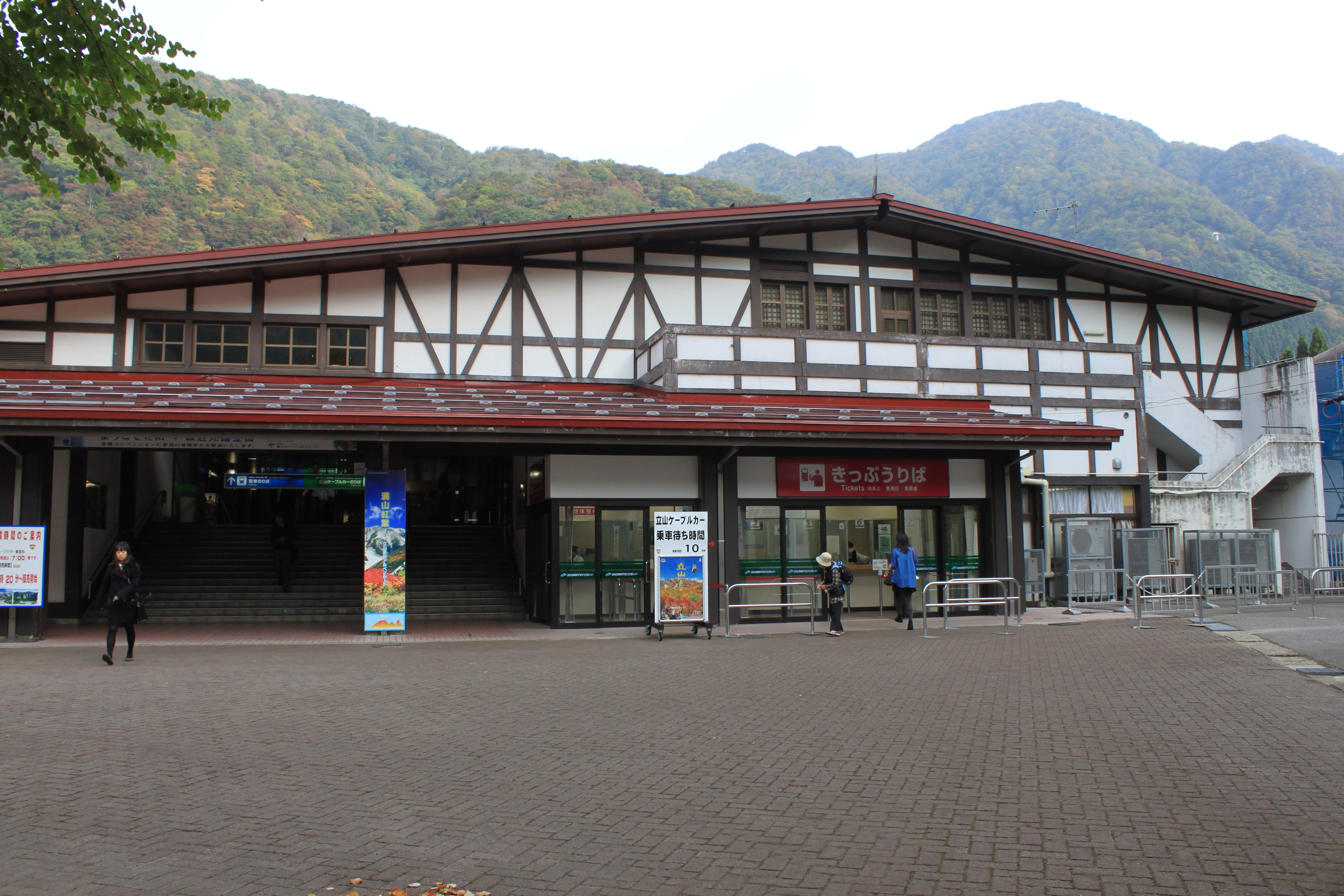
- Tateyama Station in October 2011

General information
- Location: 156 Chigaki, Tateyama-machi, Nakaniikawa-gun Toyama-ken 930-1408; Japan
- Coordinates: 36.5833137°N 137.4453163°E
- Elevation: 475 m (1,558 ft)
- Operator: Toyama Chihō Railway; Tateyama Kurobe Alpine Route (Tateyama Kurobe Kankō)
- Line: ■ Tateyama Line ■ Tateyama Cable Car
- Distance: 24.2 from Terada
- Platforms: 1 bay platform
- Tracks: 2

Other information
- Status: Staffed
- Website: Official website

History
- Opened: 1 August 1954
- Rebuilt: 1982

Passengers
- FY2015: 591
Location
- Location within Japan

Tateyama Station (立山駅, Tateyama-eki) is a railway station in the town of Tateyama, Nakaniikawa District, Toyama Prefecture, Japan, operated by the private railway operator Toyama Chihō Railway.

== Lines ==
Tateyama Station is a terminus of the Toyama Chihō Railway Tateyama Line, and is 24.2 kilometers from the opposing terminus at Terada. It is also the starting point for the Tateyama Kurobe Kankō Tateyama Cable Car (Tateyama Kurobe Alpine Route).

== Station layout ==
The station has one ground-level bay platform serving two tracks. The station is staffed.

== History ==
Tateyama Station was opened on 1 August 1954. Services of the Tateyama Cable Car were relocated to this station on 1 April 1970. The station building was renovated in 1982.

== Adjacent stations ==
«	Service	»
Toyama Chihō Railway Tateyama Line
Hongū	Local	Terminus
Hongū	Express	Terminus
Terada	Alpen Limited Express	Terminus
Tateyama Cable Car
Terminus	-	Bijodaira

== Passenger statistics ==
In fiscal 2015, the station was used by 591 passengers daily.

== Surrounding area ==
- Tateyama Ski area
- Tateyama Caldera Sabo Museum

== See also ==
- List of railway stations in Japan
