= Ōizumi Station (Toyama) =

Railway station in Toyama, Toyama Prefecture, Japan

Ōizumi Station 大泉駅
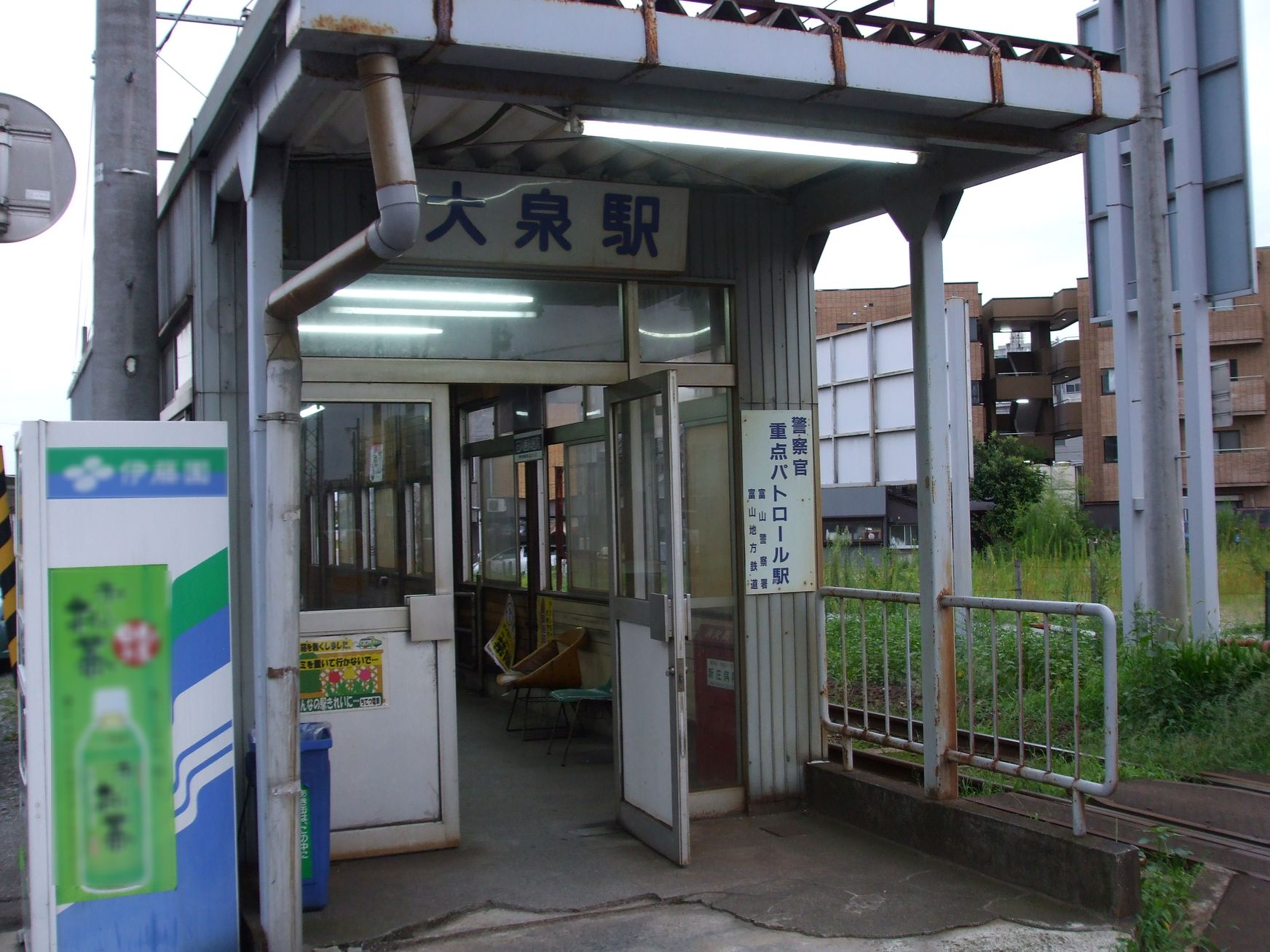
- Ōizumi Station in August 2008

General information
- Location: 1520 Ōizumi, Toyama-shi Toyama-ken 939-8058; Japan
- Coordinates: 36.6781°N 137.2293°E
- Operator: Toyama Chihō Railway
- Line: ■ Fujikoshi Line
- Distance: 2.2 from Inarimachi
- Platforms: 1 side platform
- Tracks: 1

Other information
- Status: Unstaffed
- Website: Official website

History
- Opened: 26 September 1952

Passengers
- FY2015: 124
Location
- Location within Japan

Ōizumi Station (大泉駅, Ōizumi-eki) is a railway station in the city of Toyama, Toyama Prefecture, Japan, operated by the private railway operator Toyama Chihō Railway.

== Lines ==
Ōizumi Station is served by the Toyama Chihō Railway Fujikoshi Line, and is 2.2 kilometers from the starting point of the line at Inarimachi.

== Station layout ==
The station has one ground-level side platform serving a single bi-directional track. The station is unattended.

== History ==
Ōizumi Station was opened on 26 September 1952.

== Adjacent stations ==
«	Service	»
Toyama Chihō Railway Fujikoshi Line
Fujikoshi	-	Minami-Toyama

== Surrounding area ==
- Toyama Ōizumi Junior High School

== See also ==
- List of railway stations in Japan
