= Toyama Chihō Railway Tateyama Line =

Toyama Chiho Railway Tateyama Line
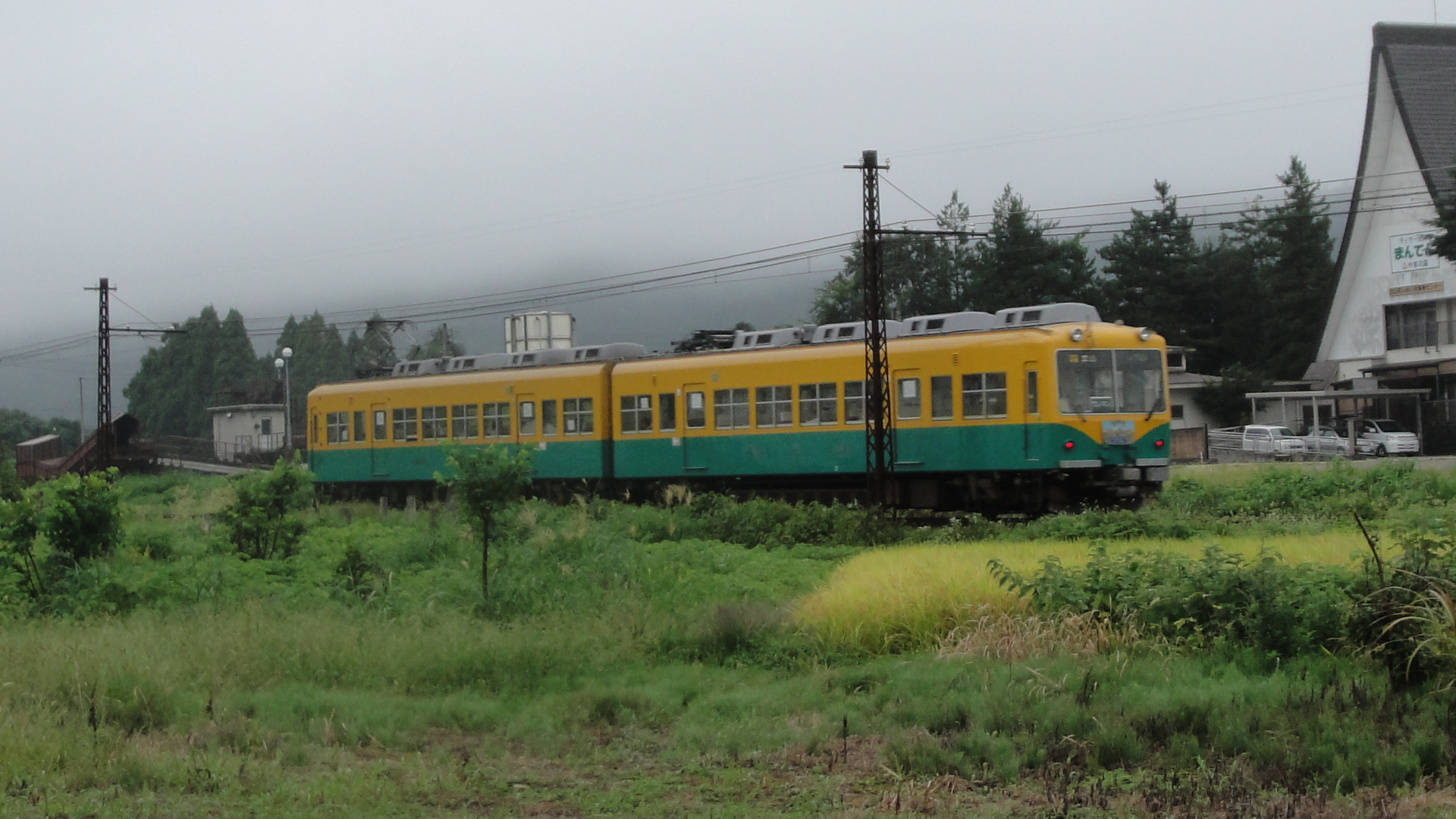
- Toyama Chihō Railway Tateyama Line

Overview
- Native name: 富山地鉄立山線
- Status: Operational
- Owner: Toyama Chihō Railway
- Locale: Toyama Prefecture
- Termini: Terada; Tateyama
- Stations: 14

Service
- Type: Heavy rail
- Operator(s): Toyama Chihō Railway

History
- Opened: 19 March 1921; 104 years ago

Technical
- Line length: 24.2 km (15.0 mi)
- Track gauge: 1,067 mm (3 ft 6 in)
- Electrification: 1,500 V DC
- Operating speed: 70 km/h (43 mph)
Route map
Line Map

The Tateyama Line (立山線, Tateyama-sen) is a Japanese railway line which connects Terada Station with Tateyama Station, all within Tateyama, Nakaniikawa District Toyama Prefecture. It is owned and run by Toyama Chihō Railway.

== History ==
The first section of what is now this line was opened by Tateyama Light Railway Co. as a 762mm gauge line between Gohyakkoku and Namerikawa (on the Toyama Chiho Railway Main Line) in 1913. The Gohyakkoku – Iwakuraji section opened in 1921.

In 1931, the company merged with the Toyama Electric Railway Co., which opened the Terada – Gohyakkoku section the same year, 1067mm gauge and electrified at 1500 VDC. The Gohyakkoku – Iwakuraji section was converted to 1067mm gauge and electrified in 1936.

In the meantime, the Toyama Prefectural Government opened the Iwakuraji – Chigaki section between 1921 and 1923 as 1067mm gauge, electrifying the section at 600 VDC in 1927, and raising the voltage to 1500 VDC in 1937, the year the section to Arimineguchi opened.

All these lines were merged in 1943 upon the creation of the Toyama Chihō Railway Co., and the line was extended to Tateyama the same year.

CTC signalling was commissioned on the line in 1976.

== Station list ==
| No | Name | | Distance (km) | Express | Limited Express | Connections | Location | |
|---|---|---|---|---|---|---|---|---|
| T08 | Terada | 寺田 | 0.0 | ● | ● | Toyama Chihō Railway Main Line | Tateyama, Nakaniikawa District | Toyama |
| T44 | Chigozuka | 稚子塚 | 1.4 | ｜ | ｜ | | Tateyama, Nakaniikawa District | Toyama |
| T45 | Tazoe | 田添 | 2.1 | ｜ | ｜ | | Tateyama, Nakaniikawa District | Toyama |
| T46 | Gohyakkoku | 五百石 | 3.7 | ● | ｜ | | Tateyama, Nakaniikawa District | Toyama |
| T47 | Enokimachi | 榎町 | 4.6 | ▲ | ｜ | | Tateyama, Nakaniikawa District | Toyama |
| T48 | Shitadan | 下段 | 5.7 | ｜ | ｜ | | Tateyama, Nakaniikawa District | Toyama |
| T49 | Kamagafuchi | 釜ヶ淵 | 7.4 | ▲ | ｜ | | Tateyama, Nakaniikawa District | Toyama |
| T50 | Sawanakayama | 沢中山 | 8.6 | ｜ | ｜ | | Tateyama, Nakaniikawa District | Toyama |
| T51 | Iwakuraji | 岩峅寺 | 10.2 | ● | ｜ | Toyama Chihō Railway Kamidaki Line | Tateyama, Nakaniikawa District | Toyama |
| T52 | Yokoe | 横江 | 13.5 | ｜ | ｜ | | Tateyama, Nakaniikawa District | Toyama |
| T53 | Chigaki | 千垣 | 17.3 | ● | ｜ | | Tateyama, Nakaniikawa District | Toyama |
| T54 | Arimineguchi | 有峰口 | 17.9 | ● | ｜ | | Toyama | Toyama |
| T55 | Hongū | 本宮 | 19.4 | ● | ｜ | | Toyama | Toyama |
| T56 | Tateyama | 立山 | 24.2 | ● | ● | Tateyama Cable Car (Tateyama Kurobe Alpine Route) | Tateyama, Nakaniikawa | Toyama |
