= Kaneo Yokoe =

Japanese politician (1934–2025)

- 横江 金夫
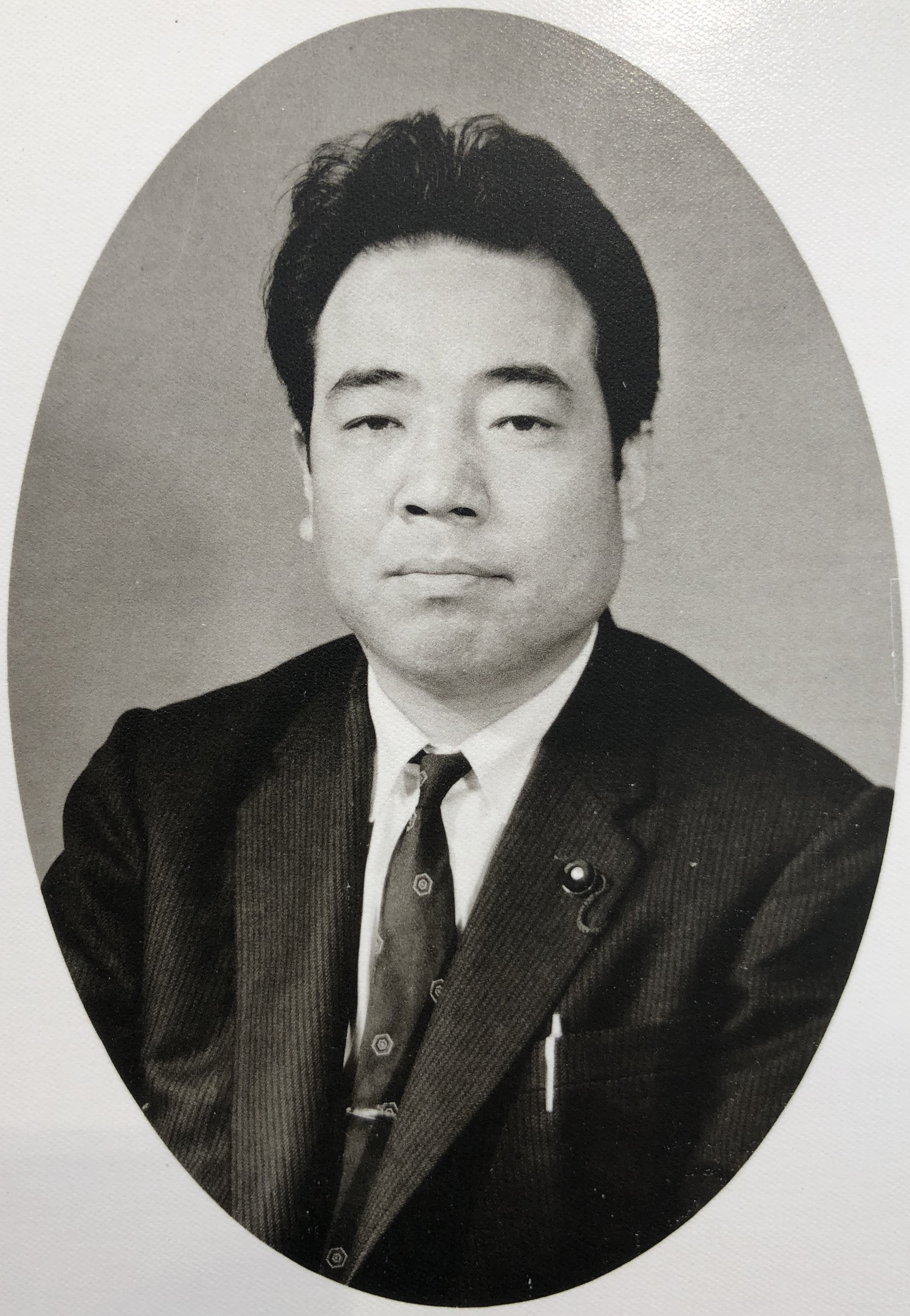
- Yokoe in 1967

Member of the House of Representatives
- In office 18 December 1983 – 2 June 1986
- Preceded by: Iwao Andō
- Succeeded by: Iwao Andō
- Constituency: Aichi 6th

Member of the Aichi Prefectural Assembly
- In office 30 April 1963 – 29 April 1979
- Constituency: Nakamura Ward, Nagoya City

Personal details
- Born: 3 January 1934 Nagoya, Aichi, Japan
- Died: 3 February 2025 (aged 91) Nagoya, Aichi, Japan
- Party: Socialist
- Education: Meiji University
- Occupation: Trade unionist

Kaneo Yokoe (Japanese: 横江金夫 Yokoe Kaneo; 3 January 1934 – 3 February 2025) was a Japanese politician. A member of the Japan Socialist Party, he served in the House of Representatives from 1983 to 1986.

Yokoe died in Nagoya on 3 February 2025, at the age of 91.
