= Tateyama Cable Car =

Coordinates: 36°34′54.3″N 137°27′8.9″E

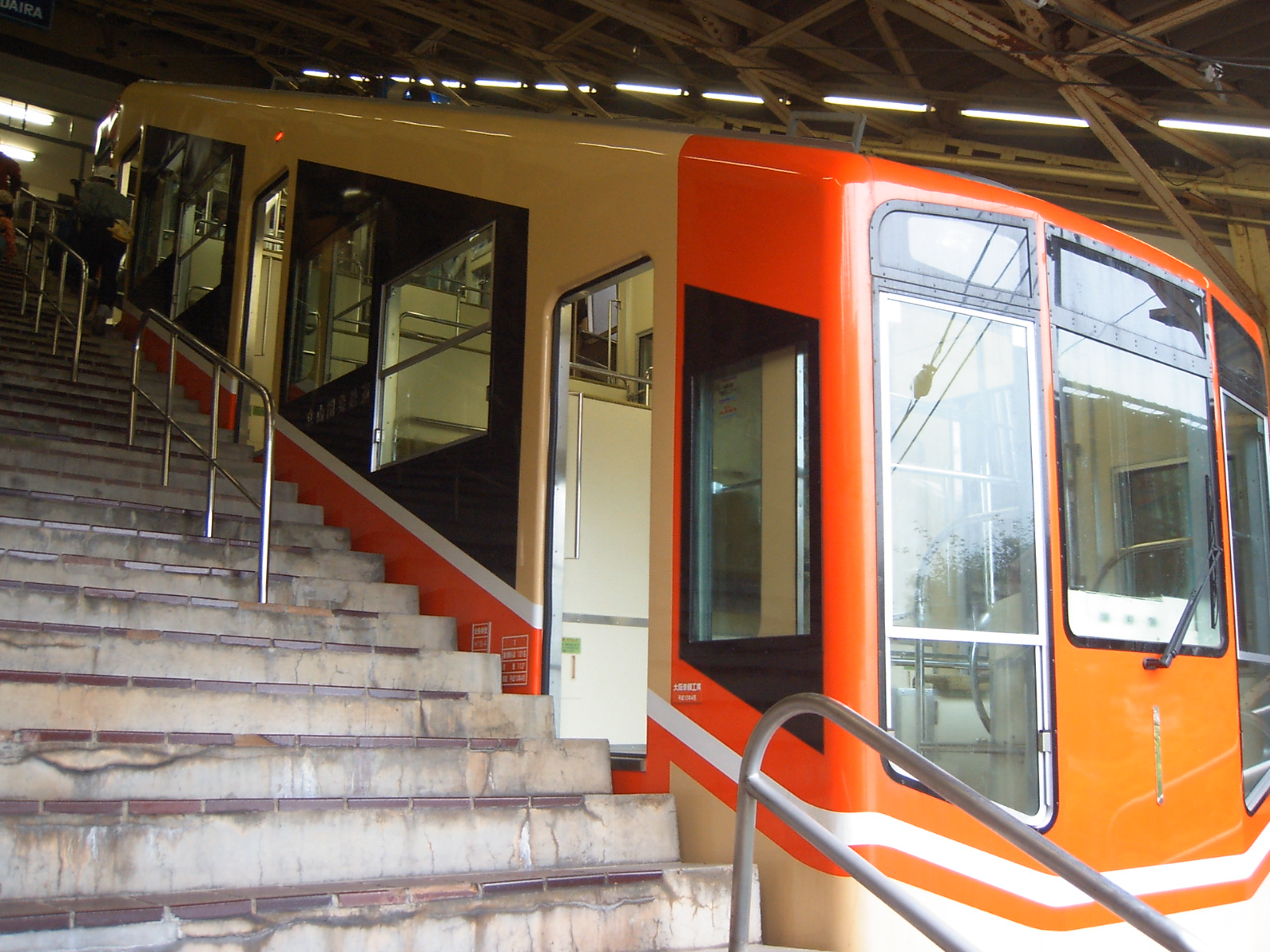
Tateyama Cable Car carriage

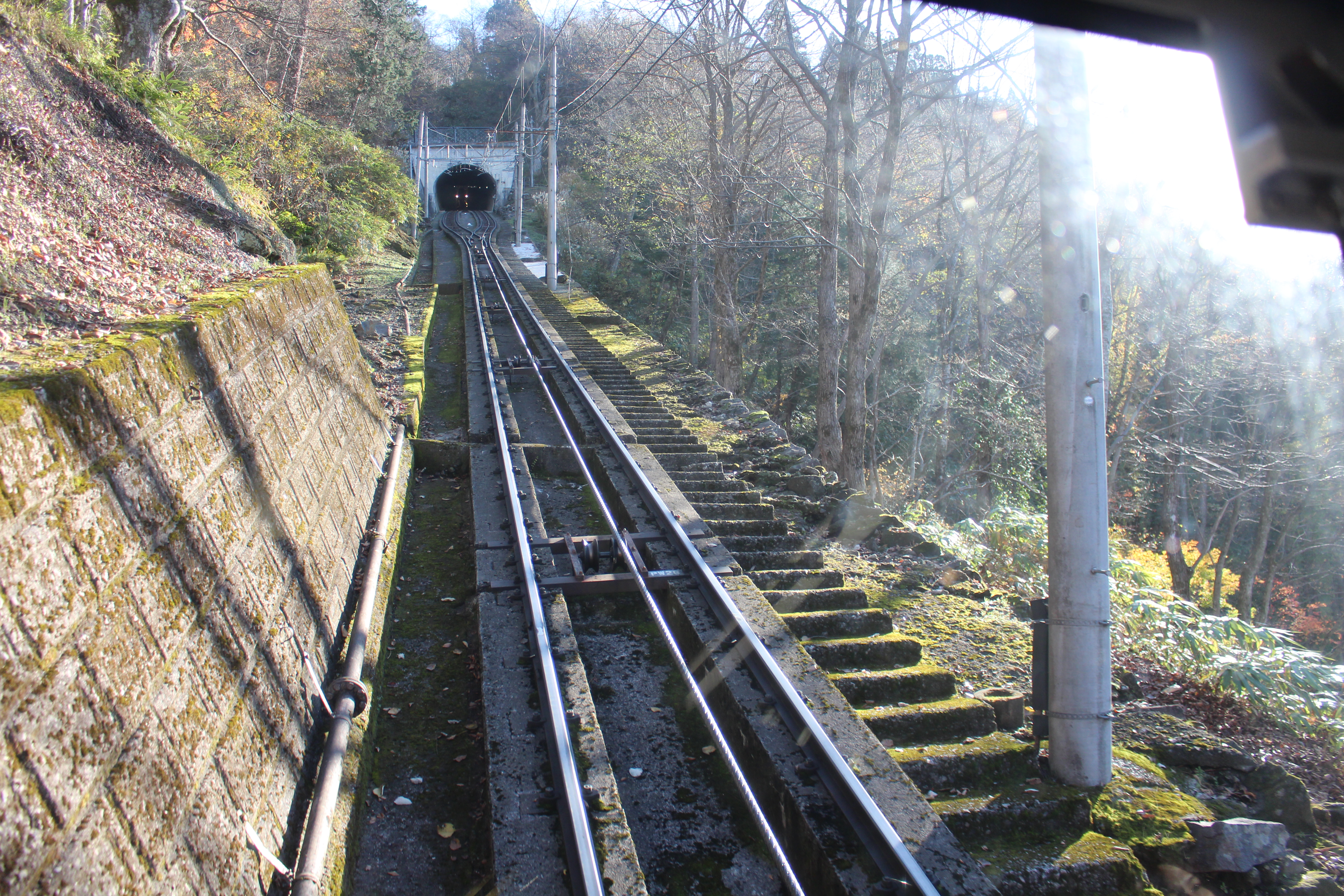
Along the line

The Tateyama Cable Car (立山ケーブルカー) is a Japanese funicular line of Tateyama Kurobe Kankō (立山黒部貫光) in Tateyama, Toyama, with its official name Cable Line (鋼索線, Kōsaku-sen). The company also operates another funicular, Kurobe Cable Car with the same official name. The line is a part of Tateyama Kurobe Alpine Route. It opened in 1954.

== Basic data ==
- Distance: 1.3 km (0.8 mi)
- Gauge: 1,067 mm (3 ft 6 in)
- Stations: 2
- Vertical interval: 487 m (1,598 ft)

== Stations ==
- Tateyama
- Bijodaira

== See also ==
- List of funicular railways
- List of railway lines in Japan
- Tateyama Kurobe Alpine Route
- Tateyama Sabō Erosion Control Works Service Train
