= Tateyama, Toyama =

Tateyama 立山町
- Town
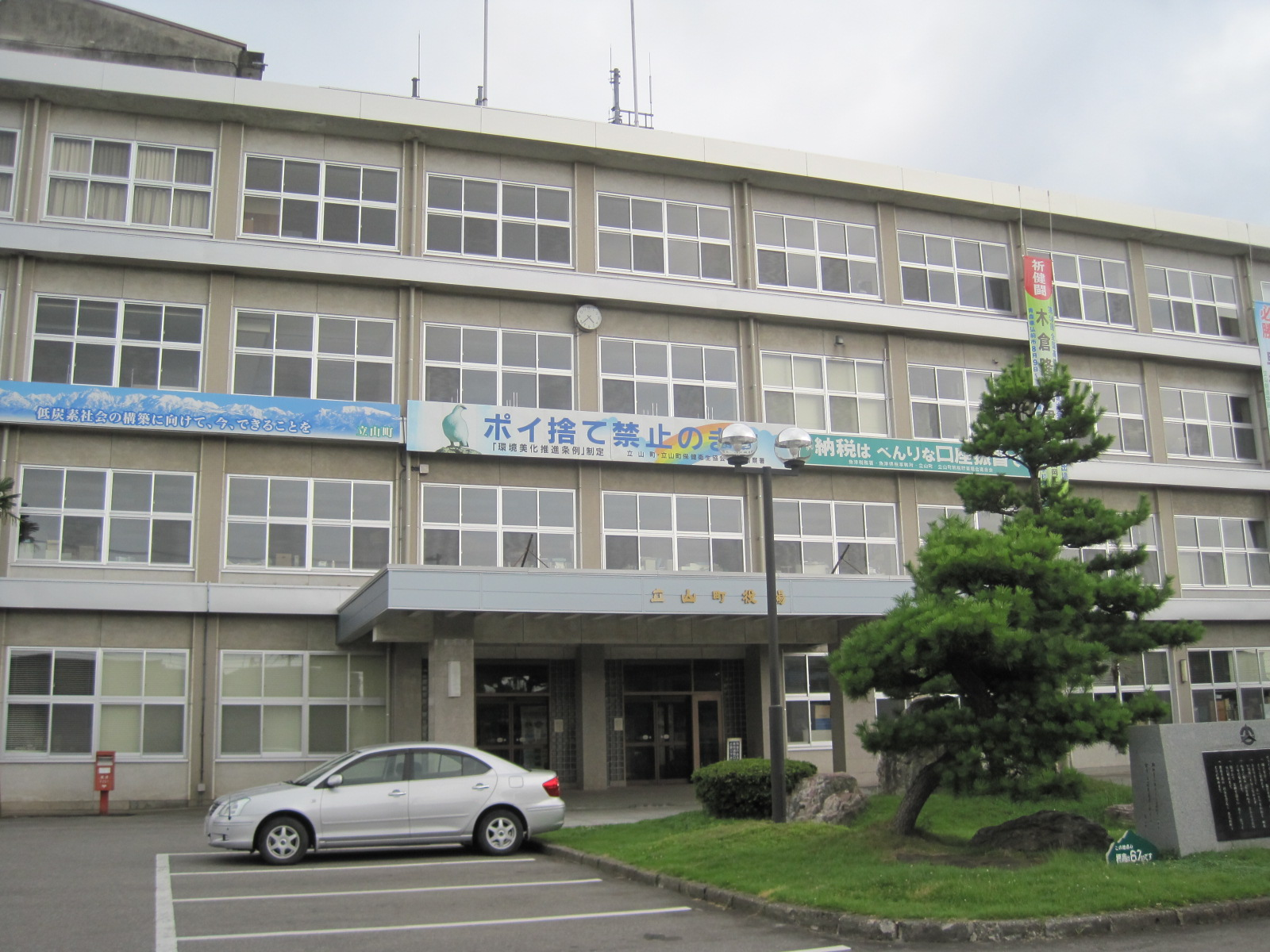
- Tateyama Town Hall

- Flag Seal

- Location of Tateyama in Toyama Prefecture

- Coordinates: 36°39′48.8″N 137°18′49.3″E
- Country: Japan
- Region: Chūbu
- Prefecture: Toyama
- District: Nakaniikawa

Government
  - Mayor: Takayuki Funahashi

Area
  - Total: 307.29 km^{2} (118.65 sq mi)

Population (October 1, 2020)
  - Total: 24,862
  - Density: 80.9/km^{2} (210/sq mi)
- Time zone: UTC+09:00 (JST)
- Symbols
  - Tree: Cryptomeria
  - Flower: Chrysanthemum × morifolium
  - Flowering tree: Rhododendron indicum
- Phone number: 076-463-1121
- Address: 2440 Maezawa, Tateyama-machi, Nakaniikawa-gun, Toyama-ken
- Website: Official website

Tateyama (立山町, Tateyama-machi) is a town located in Nakaniikawa District, Toyama Prefecture, Japan. As of 1 October 2016, the town had an estimated population of 26,212 in 9452 households and a population density of 85 persons per km^{2}. The total area of the town was 307.29 square kilometres (118.65 sq mi).

== Geography ==
Tateyama is located in east central Toyama Prefecture. The town is located in the Tateyama Mountain Range.

=== Surrounding municipalities ===
- Nagano Prefecture
  - Ōmachi
- Toyama Prefecture
  - Funahashi
  - Kamiichi
  - Kurobe
  - Toyama

=== Climate ===
The town has a humid subtropical climate (Köppen Cfa) characterized by hot summers and cold winters with heavy snowfall. The average annual temperature in Tateyama is 13.4 °C. The average annual rainfall is 2242 mm with September as the wettest month. The temperatures are highest on average in August, at around 26.2 °C, and lowest in January, at around 2.1 °C.

== Demographics ==
Per Japanese census data, the population of Tateyama was remarkably stable for several decades but has declined in recent years.

Historical population
Year	Pop.	±%
1970	27,473	—
1980	27,870	+1.4%
1990	27,237	−2.3%
2000	27,994	+2.8%
2010	27,466	−1.9%
2020	24,792	−9.7%

== History ==
The area of present-day Tateyama was part of ancient Etchū Province. The village of Tatayama was created on May 12, 1894. It was elevated to town status on January 10, 1954.

Until about the end of the Edo period, the Gohyakkoku region was called Takaharano. It originates from a time when village government officials asked the Kaga clan for permission to reclaim an open area of wild fields that was worth five hundred kokudaka, or gohyaku-kokudaka. Development went underway, and permission was granted for the formation of a town in the area. Around the area of Gohyakkoku Tenman Shrine, traffic from north to south formed between Toyama Bay and Mt. Tateyama. from there, they would intersect with streets that ran east to west from the town to central Toyama City. This set the scene for growing areas of agriculture and businesses.

== Education ==
Tateyama has seven public elementary schools and one public middle school operated by the village government. There is one public high school operated by the Toyama Board of Education.

The elementary schools are: Tateyama Elementary School, Kamagafuchi Elementary School, Takano Elementary School, Tateyama Chuo Elementary School, Rita Elementary School, Hokubu Elementary School, and Nichuano Elementary School. The middle school and high school are both named Oyama, for the shrines on Tateyama mountain.

Until 2016, there was an eighth elementary school called Shinseto Elementary, but it has since been closed due to a low number of attendees as a result of migration away from the mountainous area and towards the center of the main town.

Tateyama Town's Oyama Junior High School has been reported by Education Departments to have some of the highest English abilities in Toyama Prefecture.

== Mascot ==
Tateyama's town mascot is Raijii, combining the "rai" from "raicho" (Toyama Prefecture's bird found on Mt. Tateyama, the ptarmigan) with "jii" (lit. "old man"). He is said to be 20,005 years old, and his birthday is April 16. He carries a walking stick and his hat is in the shape of the three mountains that make up Tateyama. His job is to patrol Tateyama and protect the beautiful nature found there.

== Transportation ==
=== Railway ===
- Toyama Chihō Railway Main Line
  - Terada - Chigozuka
- Toyama Chihō Railway Tateyama Line
  - Terada - Chigozuka - Tazoe - Gohyakkoku - Enokimachi - Shitadan - Kamagafuchi - Sawanakayama - Iwakuraji - Yokoe - Chigaki
- Toyama Chihō Railway Kamidaki Line
  - Iwakuraji
- Tateyama Cable Car

=== Highway ===
- Hokuriku Expressway

== Local attractions ==
- Kurobe Dam
- Kurobe River
- Shōmyō Falls
