= Terada Station (Toyama) =

Railway station in Tateyama, Toyama Prefecture, Japan

Terada Station 寺田駅
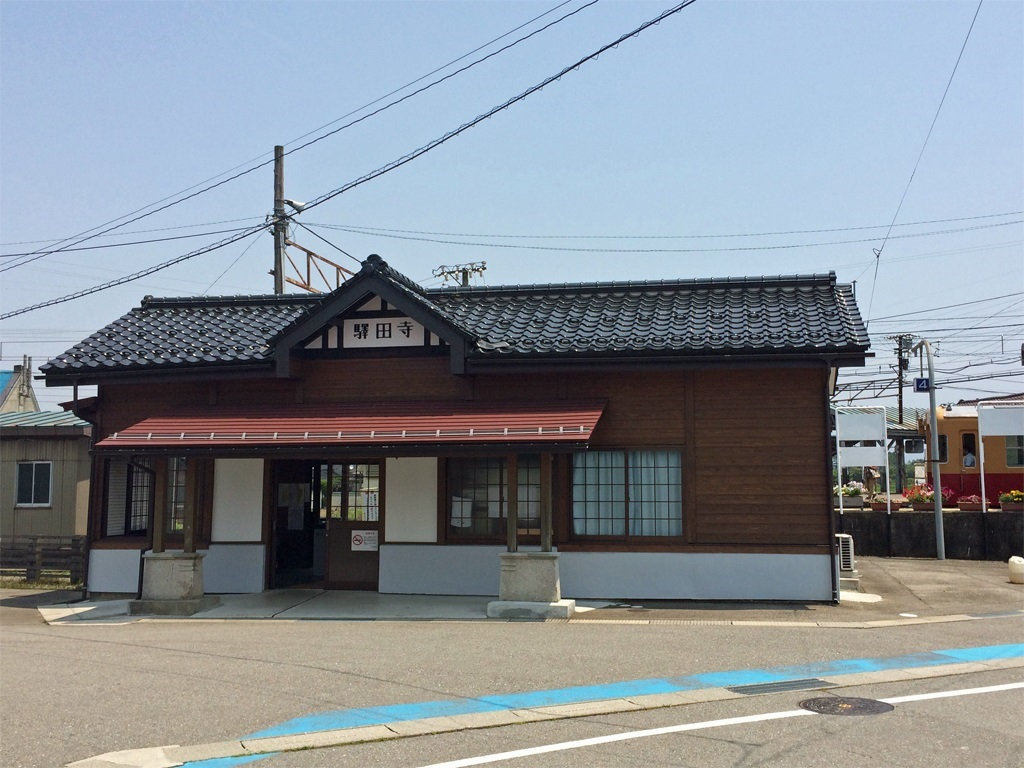
- Terada Station in June 2018

General information
- Location: 283-3 Urada, Tateyama-machi, Nakaniikawa-gun, Toyama-ken 930-0208; Japan
- Coordinates: 36.6988°N 137.3190°E
- Operator: Toyama Chihō Railway
- Lines: ■ Toyama Chihō Railway Main Line; ■ Toyama Chihō Railway Tateyama Line
- Distance: 9.8 km from Dentetsu-Toyama
- Platforms: 4 side platforms
- Tracks: 4

Construction
- Parking: 11 spaces
- Cycle facilities: 30 spaces

Other information
- Status: Staffed
- Website: Official website

History
- Opened: 15 August 1931

Passengers
- FY2015: 350 daily
Location
- Location within Japan

Terada Station (寺田駅, Terada-eki) is a railway station in the town of Tateyama, Nakaniikawa District, Toyama Prefecture, Japan, operated by the Toyama Chihō Railway.

== Lines ==
Terada Station is served by the Toyama Chihō Railway Main Line and also the Toyama Chihō Railway Tateyama Line. It is 9.8 kilometers from the starting point of the Main Line at Dentetsu-Toyama and is a terminus for the Tateyama Line.

== Station layout ==
The station has two sets of opposed ground-level side platforms serving four tracks. The platforms are not sequentially numbered. The station is staffed.

=== Platforms ===
4	■ Toyama Chihō Railway Main Line	for Kamiichi, Dentetsu Kurobe, and Unazuki-Onsen
1	■ Toyama Chihō Railway Main Line	for Dentetsu Toyama (connecting from Main Line
3	■ Toyama Chihō Railway Main Line	for Dentetsu Toyama (connecting from Tateyama Line)
2	■ Toyama Chihō Railway Tateyama Line	for Tateyama

== Adjacent stations ==
«	Service	»
Toyama Chihō Railway Main Line
Dentetsu-Toyama	Limited Express	Kamiichi
Inarimachi	Rapid Express	Kamiichi
Etchū-Funahashi	Express	Kamiichi
Etchū-Funahashi	Local	Etchū-Izumi
Toyama Chihō Railway Tateyama Line
Kamiichi	Alpen Limited Express	Tateyama
Dentetsu-Toyama (1 train for Tateyama in the morning); Etchū-Funahashi	Express	Gohyakkoku
Etchū-Funahashi	Local	Chigozuka

== History ==
The station opened on 15 August 1931.

== Passenger statistics ==
In fiscal 2015, the station was used by 350 passengers daily.

== See also ==
- List of railway stations in Japan
