= Toyama Chihō Railway =

Railway company in Toyama, Japan

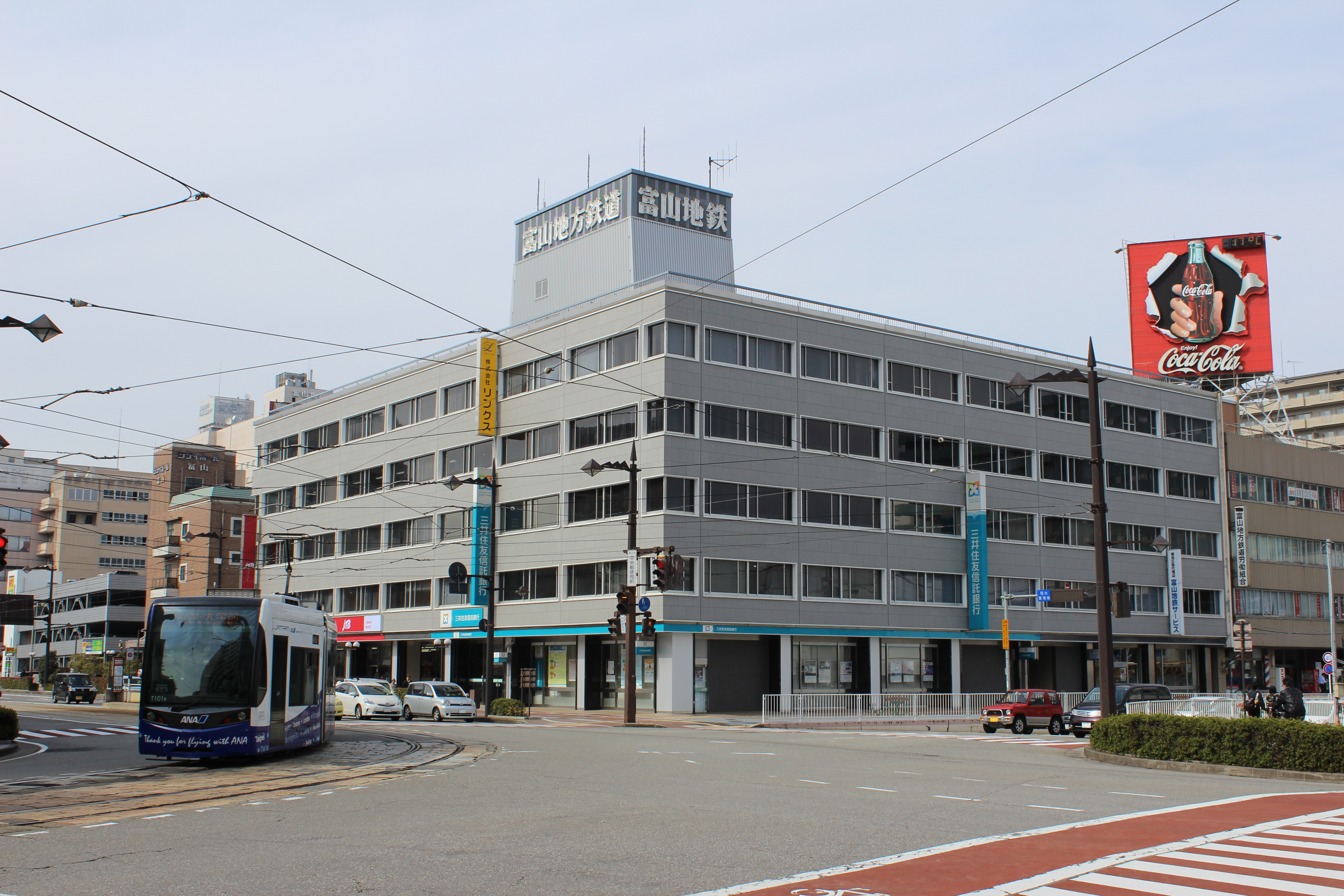
- Toyama Chihō Railway head office
- Native name: 富山地方鉄道
- Romanized name: Toyama Chihō Tetsudō
- Company type: Public-private KK
- Industry: Transportation
- Founded: 11 February 1930
- Website: Official website

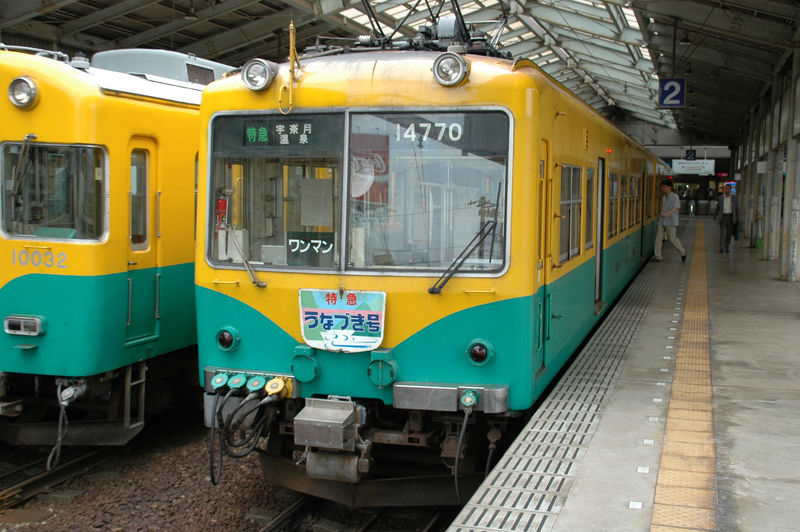
A 14760 series train

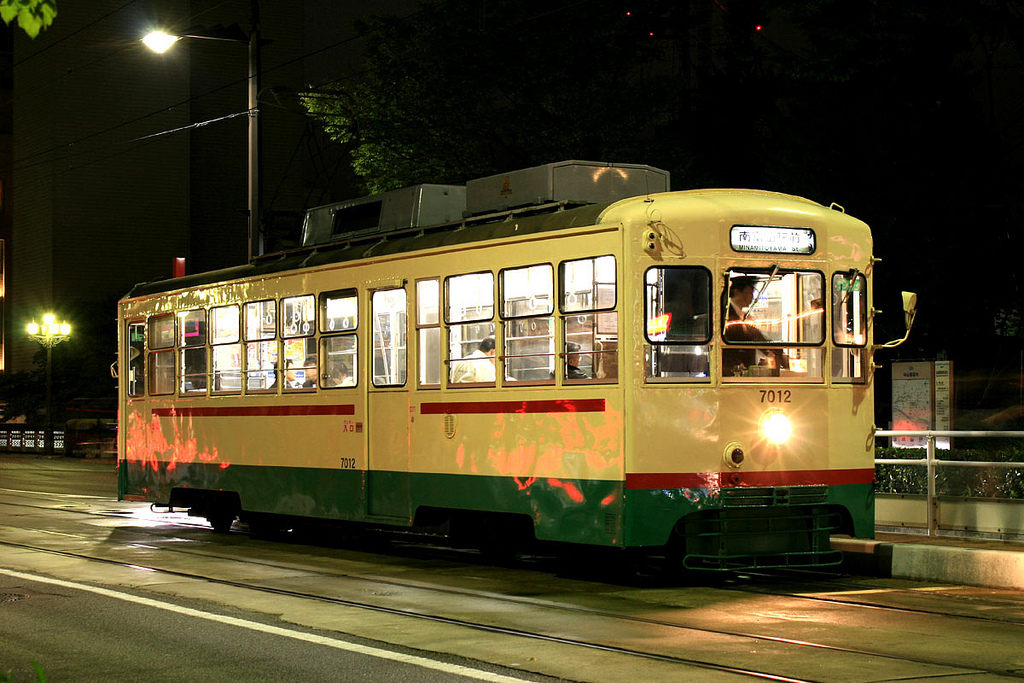
A 7000 series tramcar

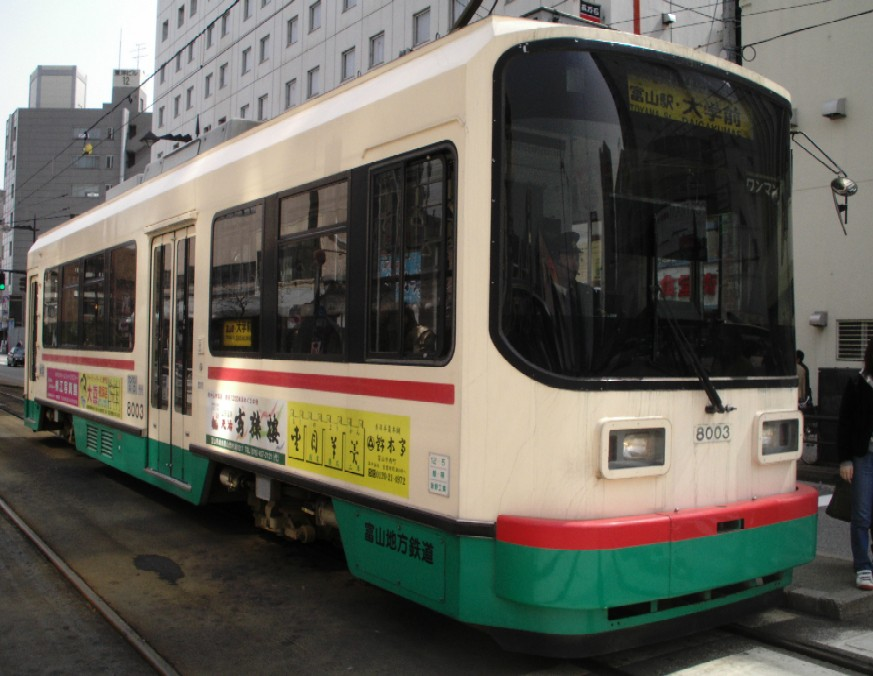
An 8000 series tramcar

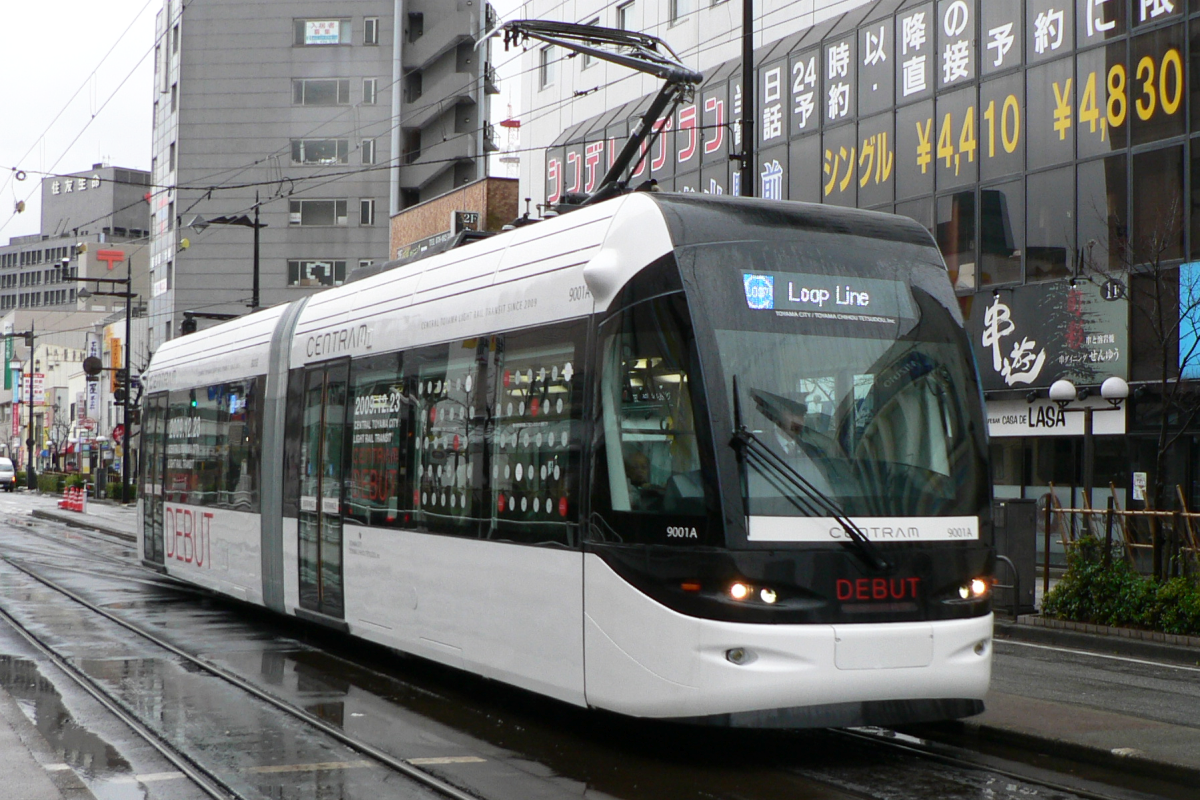
A 9000 series "Centram" tramcar

The Toyama Chihō Railway (富山地方鉄道, Toyama Chihō Tetsudō; "Toyama Regional Railway") is a transportation company in Toyama, Toyama Prefecture, Japan. The company is commonly known as Chitetsu (地鉄). This private company operates railway, tram, and bus services in the eastern part of the prefecture. It also operates as the agency of All Nippon Airways in Toyama area. The company has its root in Toyama Electric Railway (富山電気鉄道, Toyama Denki Tetsudō) founded in 1930. The current company was founded in 1943, when all the private and public operators of railway, tram, and bus lines in the prefecture were merged into one. In 1950, it founded Kaetsunō Railway, planning to build the railway line that links Toyama and Ishikawa. Chitetsu handed over its networks in the western part of Toyama Prefecture, although the plan never came to fruition.

== Lines ==
=== Railway lines ===
■ Toyama Chiho Railway Main Line (本線): Dentetsu-Toyama — Unazuki-Onsen
■ Toyama Chiho Railway Tateyama Line (立山線): Terada — Tateyama
■ Fujikoshi-Kamidaki Line: These two lines are treated as a single line.

Fujikoshi Line (不二越線): Inarimachi — Minami-Toyama
Kamidaki Line (上滝線): Minami-Toyama — Iwakuraji

All the trains from Tateyama Line and Fujikoshi-Kamidaki Line have through services to the Main Line, reaching Dentetsu-Toyama.

Route map

=== Tram lines ===
==== Lines ====
The tram lines are collectively called the Toyama City Tram Line, officially consisting of five lines.

- Main Line (本線): Minami-Toyama-Ekimae — Toyama-Ekimae
  - This is a different line from ■ Main Line (railway).
- Branch Line (支線): Toyama-Ekimae — Marunouchi
- Yasunoya Line (安野屋線): Marunouchi — Yasunoya
- Kureha Line (呉羽線): Yasunoya — Daigaku-mae
- Toyama Toshin Line (富山都心線): Marunouchi — Nishichō
- Toyamakō Line (富山港線): Toyama-Ekimae — Iwasehama

==== Routes ====
The tram operates in two routes. The Main, Branch, Yasunoya and Kureha lines effectively make a single route, from Minami-Toyama-Ekimae to Daigaku-mae. Some tramcars run between Minami-Toyama-Ekimae and Toyama-Ekimae. The Branch Line, the Toyama Toshin Line and a part of the Main Line form a circle route in the city center. The latter route was introduced in December 2009 when the Toyama Toshin Line opened.

There is a plan to link Toyama-Ekimae Station and Toyamaekikita Station of Toyama Light Rail, currently 250 m away. After two tram lines are linked, they will have a through service.

=== Bus lines ===
The company operates local bus lines in the whole eastern part of the prefecture, including Toyama City. It also operates many highway buses linking Toyama City and other parts of Japan, including Tokyo, Osaka, Nagoya, and Kanazawa.

== Accidents and incidents ==
In April 2023, a nineteen-year-old track maintenance worker was struck and killed by a train. On 6 June 2024, the Toyama Labor Standards Inspection Office referred the company and three of its employees to the prosecutor's office for alleged violations of the Industrial Safety and Health Act in connection with the accident.

== Related companies ==
- Kaetsunō Railway
- Tateyama Kurobe Kankō

== See also ==
- List of railway companies in Japan
- List of light-rail transit systems
