= Kurobedaira Station =

Funicular railway in Tateyama, Japan

Coordinates: 36.5672°N 137.6503°E

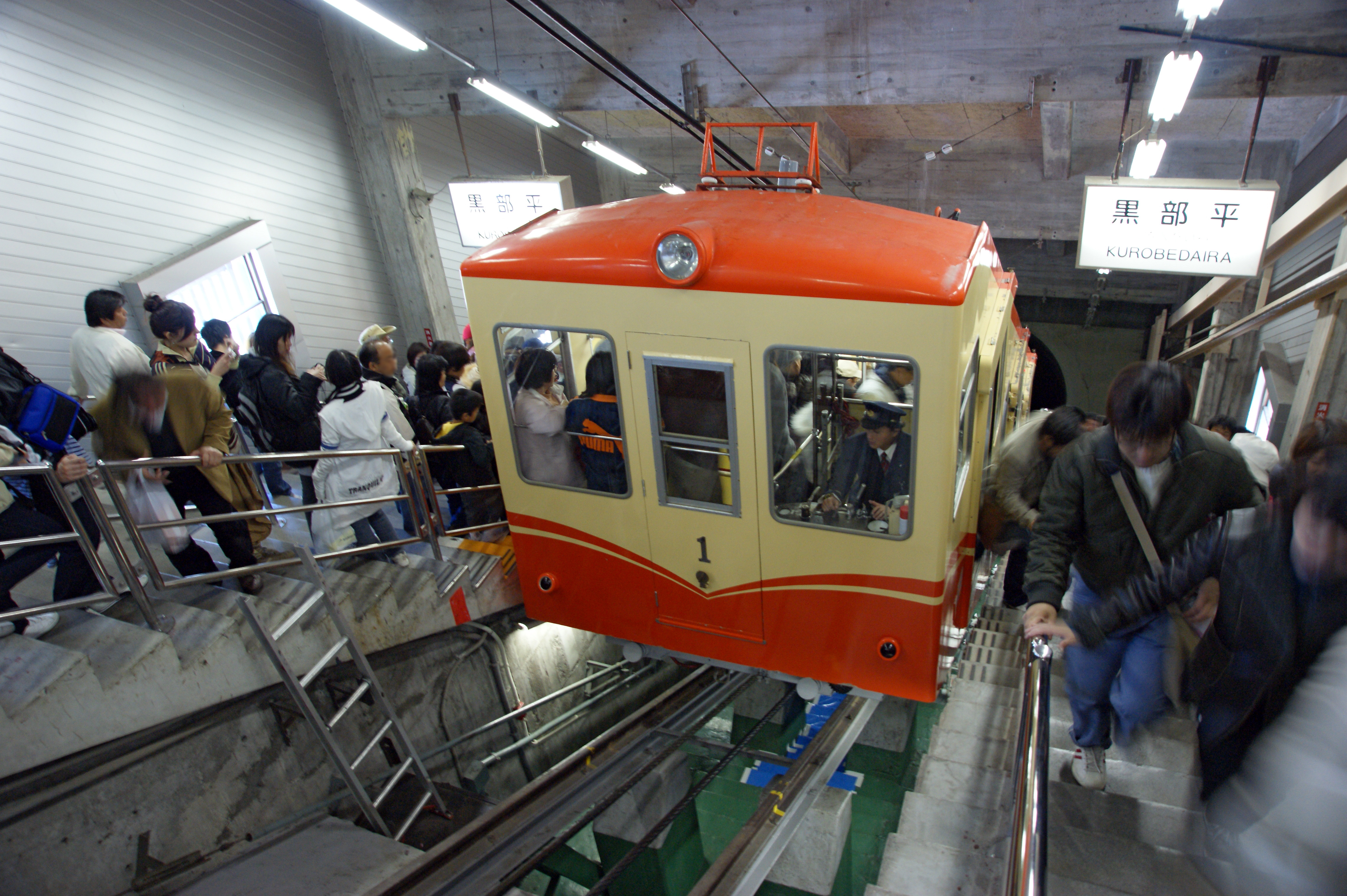
Kurobedaira Station for the Kurobe Cable Car.

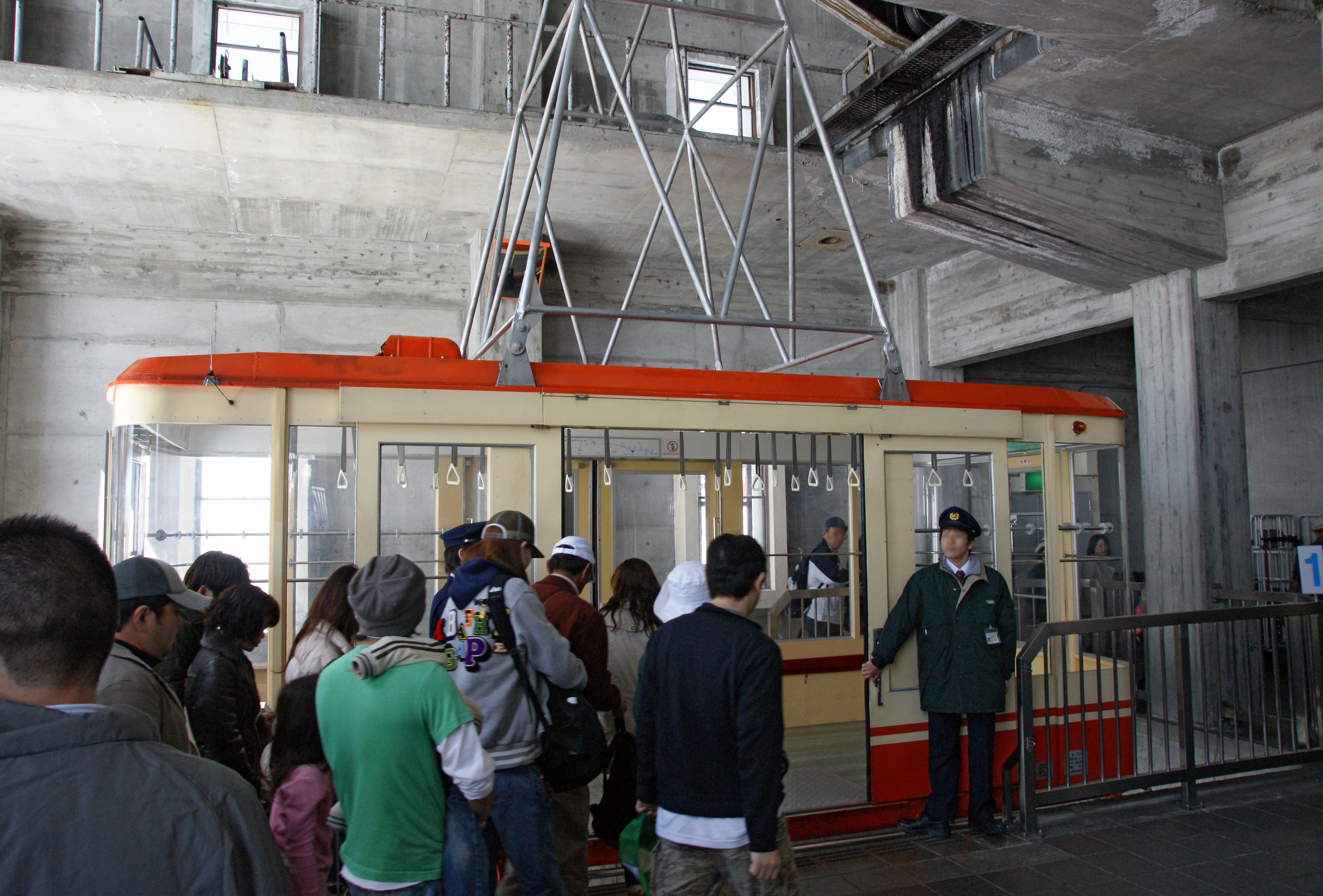
Kurobedaira Station for the Tateyama Ropeway

Kurobedaira Station (黒部平駅, Kurobedaira-eki) is a funicular and cable car station in Tateyama, Nakaniikawa District, Toyama Prefecture, Japan.

== Lines ==
- Tateyama Kurobe Kankō
  - Tateyama Ropeway (Tateyama Kurobe Alpine Route)
  - Kurobe Cable Car (Tateyama Kurobe Alpine Route)

== Adjacent stations ==
«	Service	»
Tateyama Ropeway
Daikanbō	-	Terminus
Kurobe Cable Car
Terminus	-	Kurobeko
