= Daikanbō Station =

Cable car station in Tateyama, Japan

Coordinates: 36.5696919°N 137.6316977°E

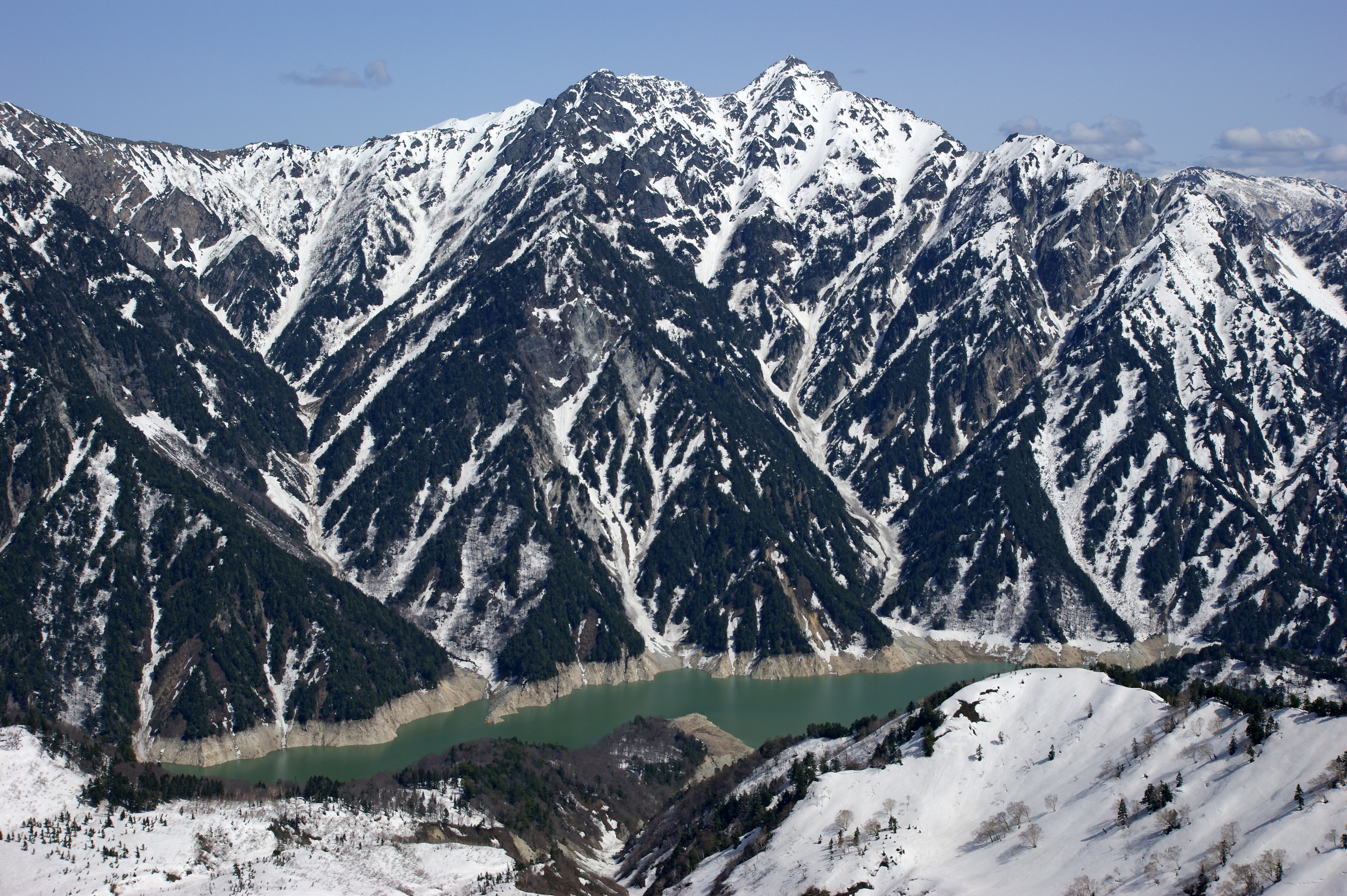
Lake Kurobe view from Daikanbō Station

Daikanbō Station (大観峰駅, Daikanbō-eki) is a trolleybus and cable car station in Tateyama, Nakaniikawa District, Toyama Prefecture, Japan.

== Lines ==
- Tateyama Kurobe Kankō
  - Tateyama Tunnel Trolley Bus (Tateyama Kurobe Alpine Route)
  - Tateyama Ropeway (Tateyama Kurobe Alpine Route)

== Adjacent stations ==
«	Service	»
Tateyama Tunnel Trolley Bus
Murodō	-	Terminus
Tateyama Ropeway
Terminus	-	Kurobedaira
