= Tateyama Tunnel Electric Bus =

Electric bus line in Japan

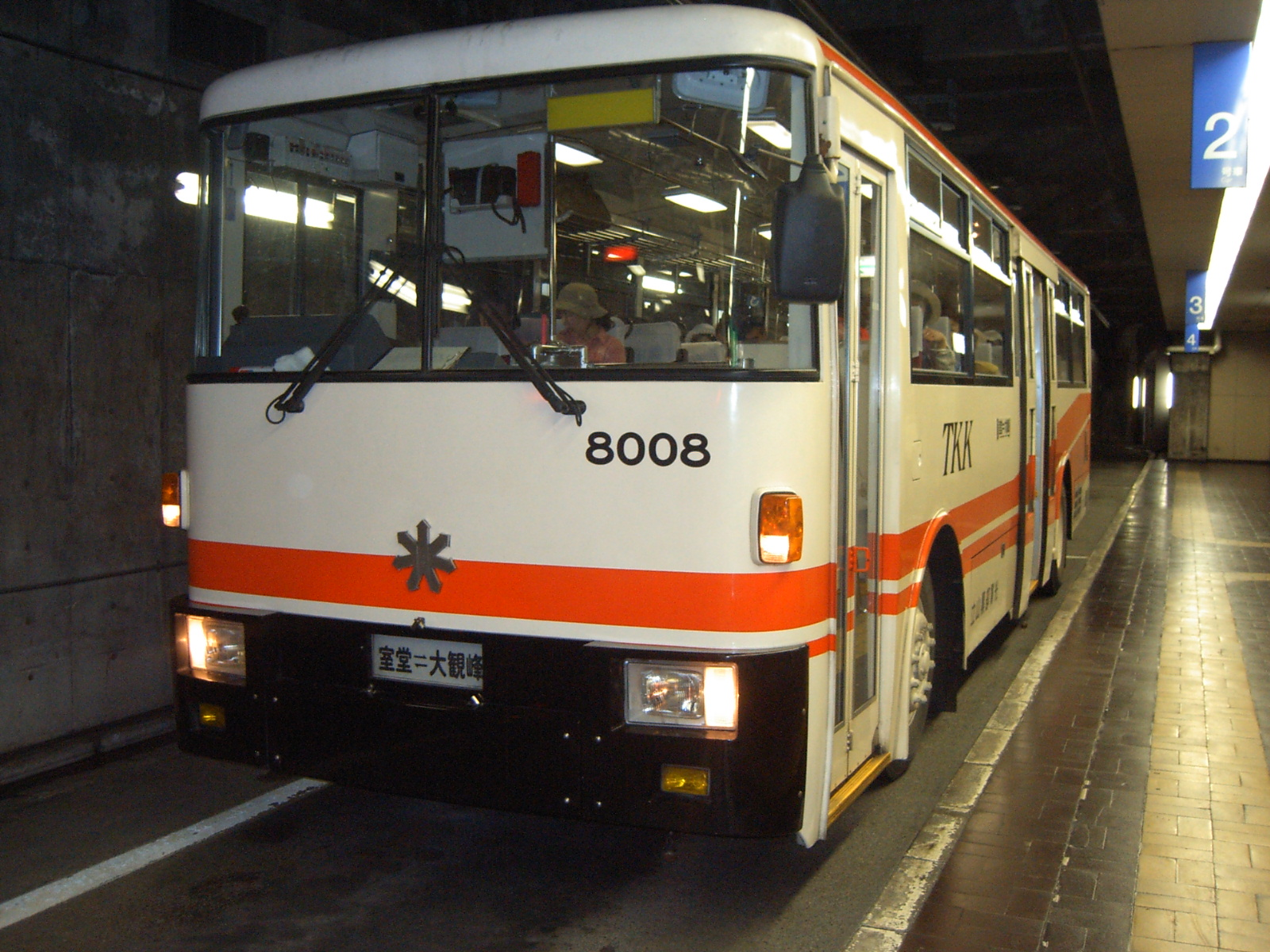

Overview
- Locale: Toyama Prefecture, Japan
- Termini: Murodō Station; Daikanbō Station

Service
- Type: Electric bus in exclusive tunnel
- System: Tateyama Kurobe Alpine Route
- Operator: Tateyama Kurobe Kankō Company
- Ridership: 735,000 (annual, 2002)

History
- Opened: April 1971; 55 years ago

Technical
- Line length: 3.7 km (2.3 mi)
- Highest elevation: 2,450 m (8,040 ft)

The Tateyama Tunnel Electric Bus (立山トンネル電気バス, Tateyama Tonneru Denki Basu) is an underground electric bus line in Tateyama, Toyama, operated by the Tateyama Kurobe Kankō Company. Until 2024, it was a trolleybus known as the Tateyama Tunnel Trolleybus (立山トンネルトロリーバス, Tateyama Tonneru Tororībasu), officially the Trolleybus Line (無軌条電車線, Mukijō Densha-sen), and was the last trolleybus service in Japan in its final years. Now operated by battery-electric buses, the line is entirely underground (in tunnel), including both termini. The line is a part of the Tateyama Kurobe Alpine Route, a sightseeing route to the Kurobe Dam that also includes bus, funicular and aerial tramway lines.

It was the last remaining trolleybus line in Japan, following the similar conversion of the Kanden Tunnel Trolleybus line to battery operation in November 2018. It was also the last non-museum trolleybus line in the world using right-hand drive vehicles running left-hand. Trolleybus operation was permanently discontinued at the end of the 2024 season. Battery-electric buses took over the service at the beginning of the 2025 season.

== History ==
The line originally opened as a normal (diesel) bus line in April 1971, but was later re-equipped for trolleybuses. The trolleybus line opened on 23 April 1996.

== Route and services ==
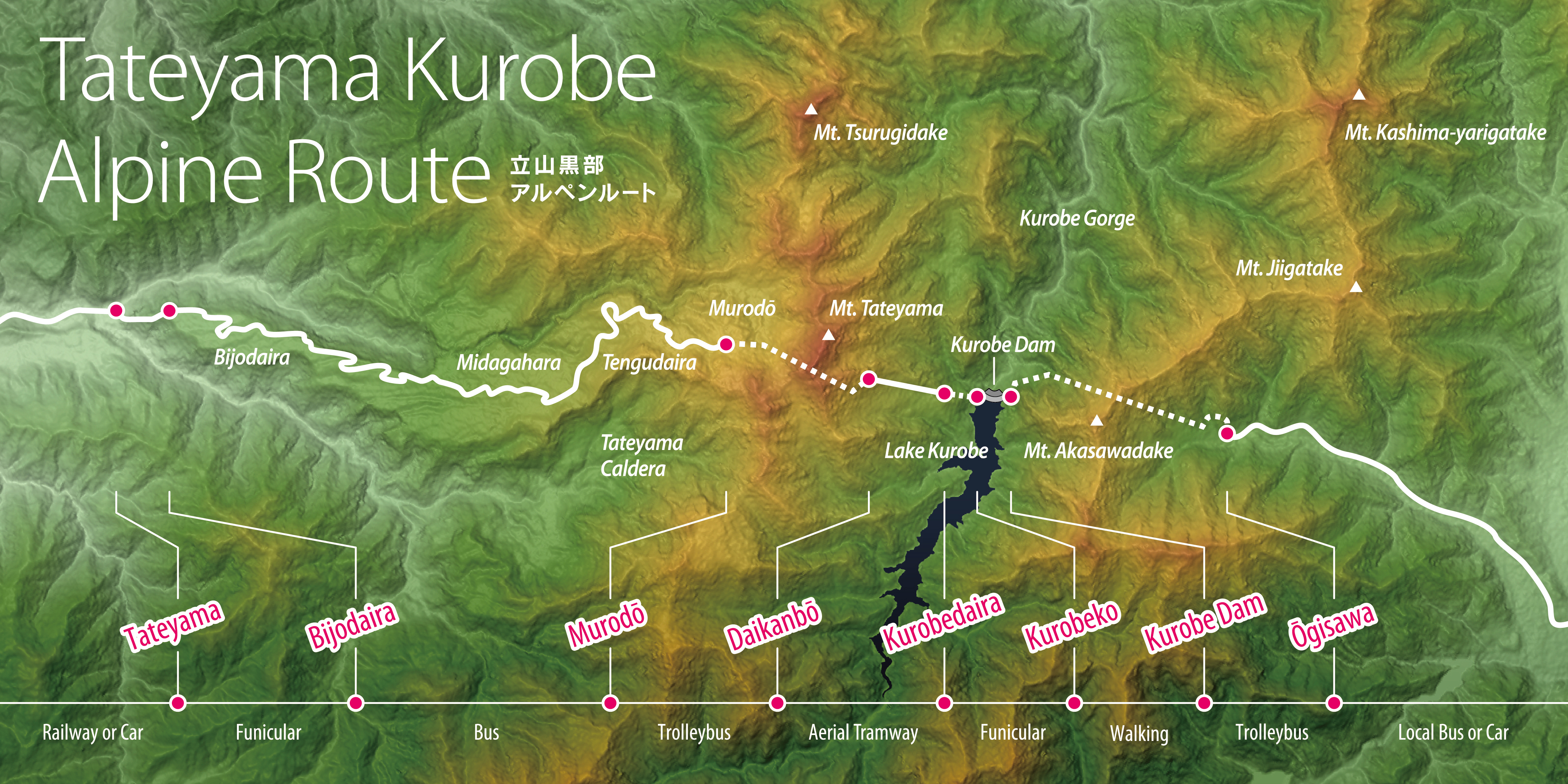
Full map of the Tateyama Kurobe Alpine Route; the Tateyama Tunnel Trolleybus connects Murodō and Daikanbō Stations

The Tateyama Tunnel Trolleybus forms a component of the Tateyama Kurobe Alpine Route, a mountain sightseeing route between Tateyama, Toyama and Ōmachi, Nagano. The trolleybus line connects to the Tateyama Highland Bus at its western terminus, and to the Tateyama Ropeway at its eastern terminus.

The trolleybus line operates in an exclusive tunnel through Tateyama (Mount Tate), whose peak reaches a height of 3,015 m (9,892 ft). Murodō Station, the western terminus, is at an elevation of 2,450 m (8,040 ft), descending to 2,316 m (7,598 ft) at the eastern terminus of Daikanbō Station. Murodō Station is the highest elevation on the Alpine Route, which ascends from near sea level at Toyama Station.

There are no intermediate stations in the tunnel, and all buses run nonstop between the two stations. The 3.7 km (2.3 mi) journey takes approximately 10 minutes. The majority of the tunnel is a single lane, with a passing lane provided.

== Regulation ==
When it was operated with trolleybuses, the Tateyama Tunnel Trolleybus was regulated as a railway under the terms of the Railway Business Law, which contains provisions for "special railways," which also covers monorails, suspension railways, and cable railways.

== Statistics ==
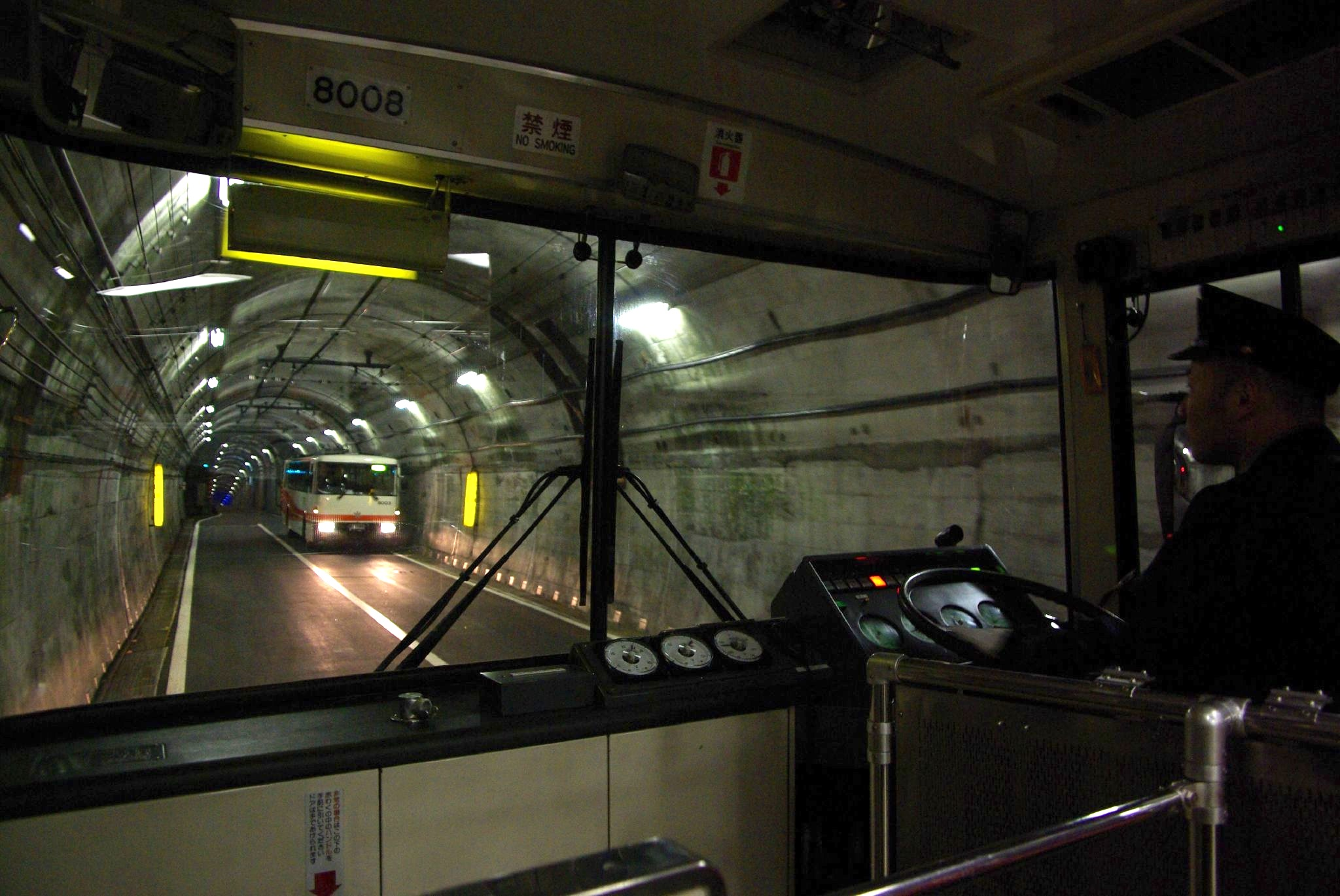
Passing another trolleybus inside the tunnel

- Distance: 3.7 km (2.3 mi)
- Stations: 2
- Double-track line: None
- Electric supply: 600 V DC
- Railway signalling: Automatic signal system
  - Buses start while the signal is clear, and the number of vehicles is counted.
- Fleet (1996–2024): 8 trolleybuses, built in 1995–96 by Osaka Sharyo Kogyo (on Mitsubishi Fuso chassis), numbered 8001–8008.
- Ridership: 735,000 per year (2002)

== Closure as trolleybus ==
On 11 December 2023, Tateyama Kurobe Kankō announced plans to discontinue its trolleybus service on 1 December 2024 and replace it with battery-electric bus service from April 2025. In keeping with plans reported in June 2024, the last day of trolleybus service was 30 November 2024. The line was the last trolleybus service in Japan.

== See also ==
- Mount Tate
- List of trolleybus systems
- List of railway lines in Japan
