= Midagahara =

Wetland on the island of Honshu, Japan

Coordinates: 36.5666°N 137.5333°E

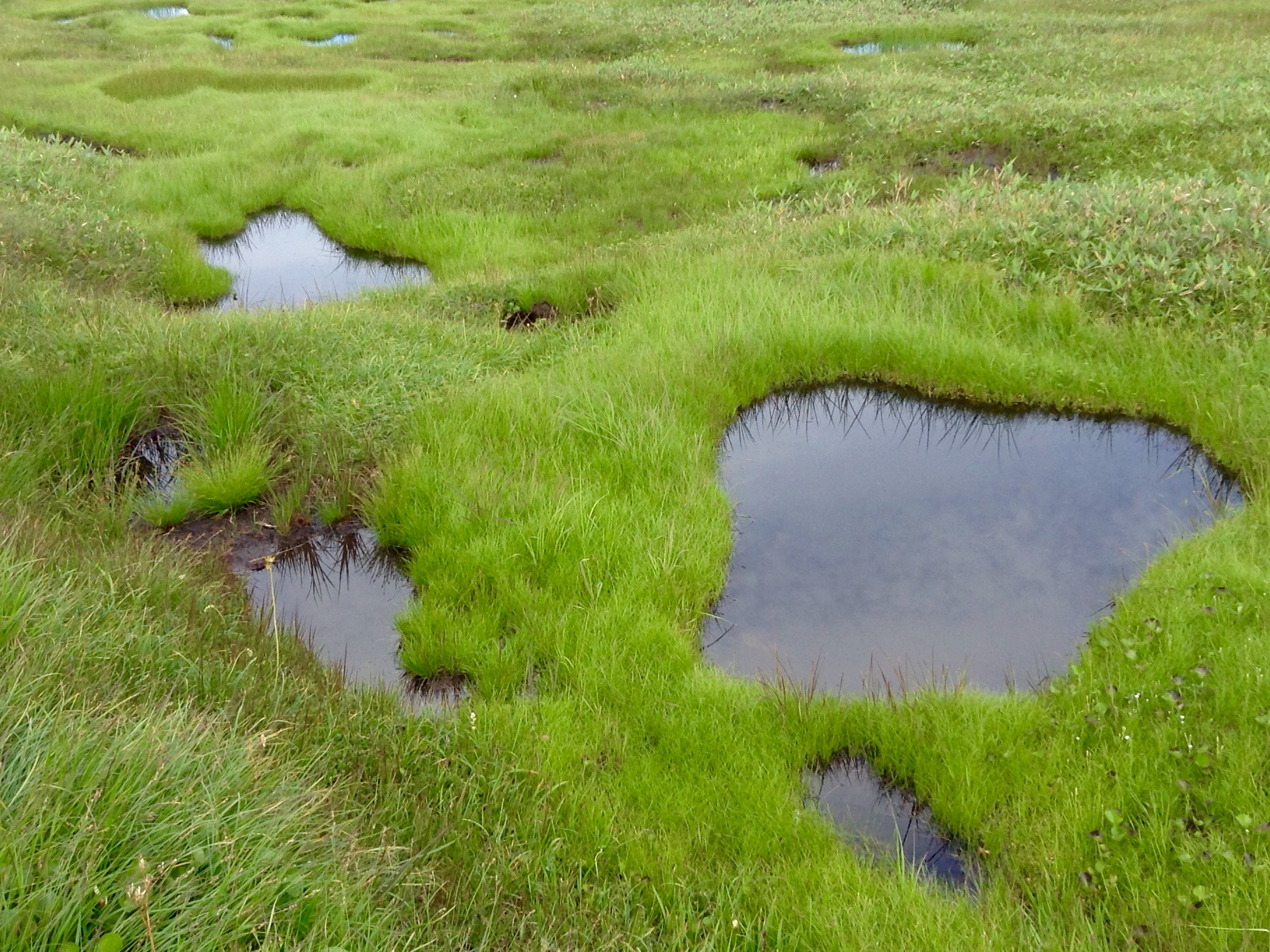
Highland bog typical to the region

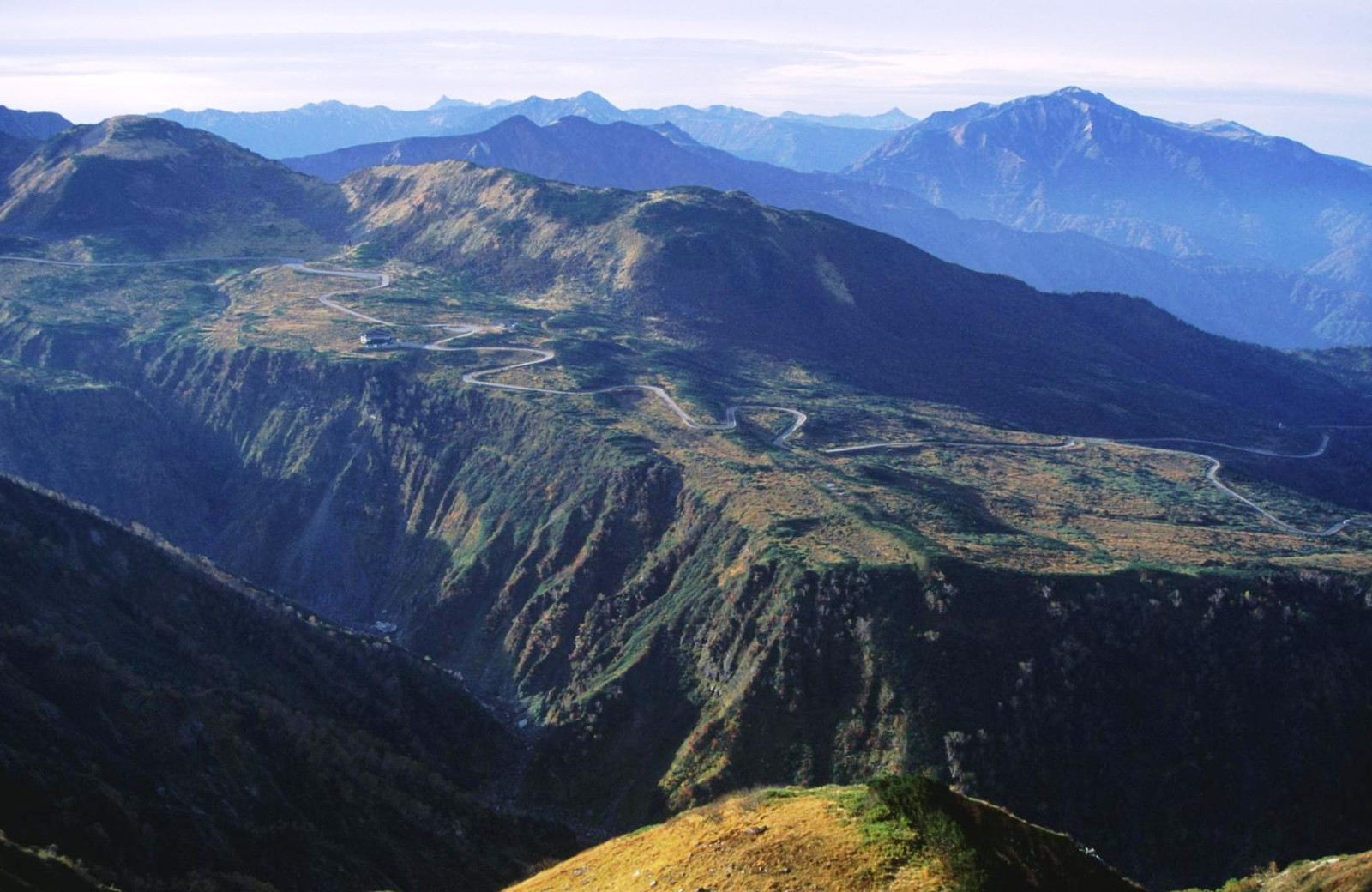
Midagahara seen from Mount Okdainichi

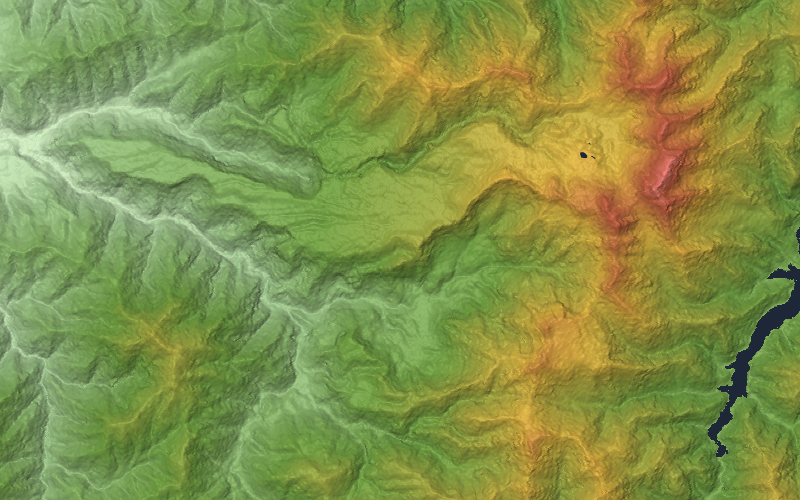
Midagahara Geology

Midagahara (弥陀ヶ原, Midaga-hara) is a wetlands located near Tateyama in Toyama Prefecture, in Japan. the remaining 80,000 ha of wetlands have been designated a Ramsar Site in 2012.

Midagahara is a one of many highlights of Tateyama Kurobe Alpine Route.

== Geography ==
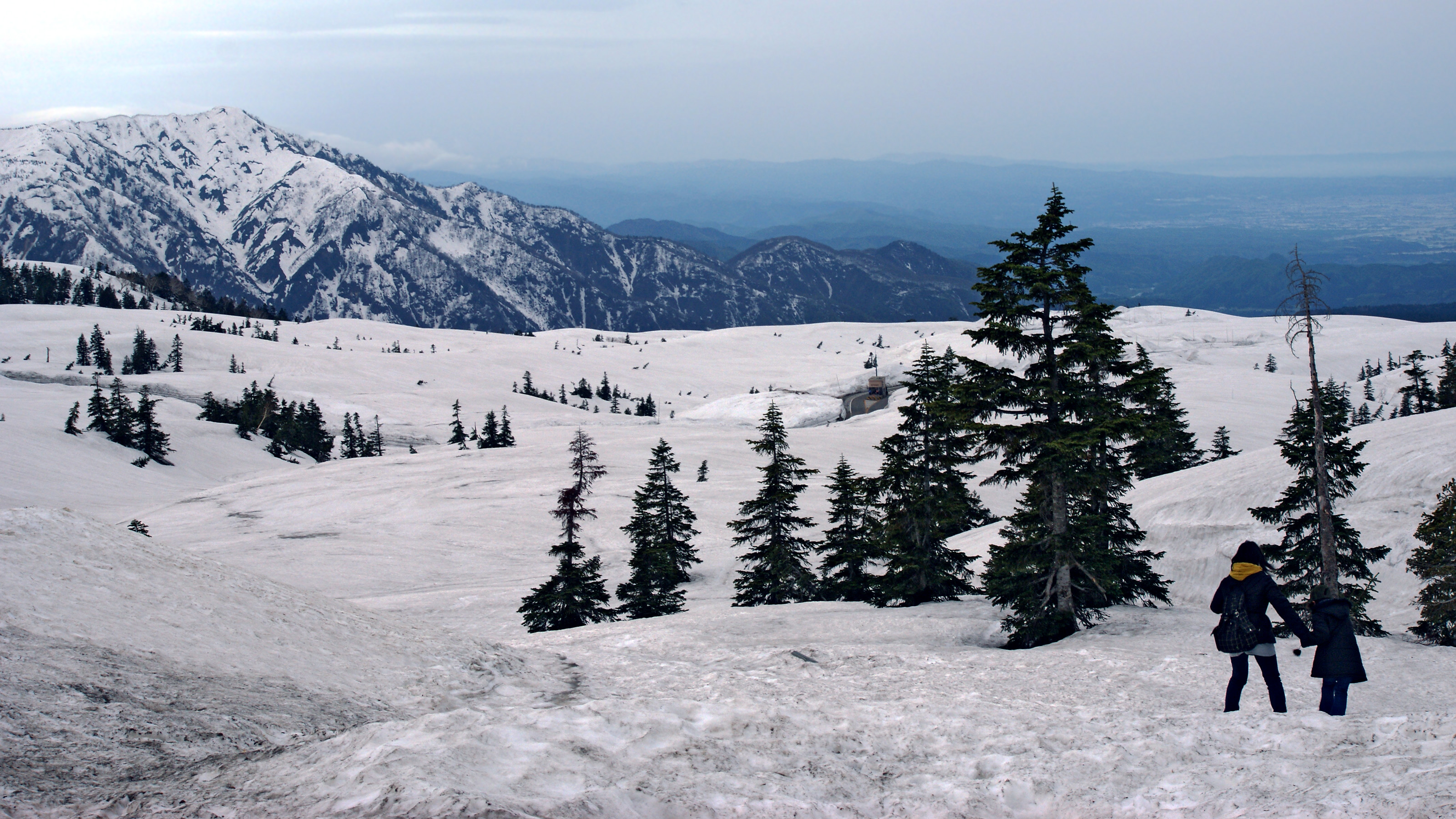
Midagahara in winter

Midagahara is 2 km of Horizontal length and 4 km of vertical length.

Midagahara is a lava plateau formed by Tateyama volcano.

== Biota ==
There are Dactylorhiza aristata, Paris japonica, Lysichiton camtschatcensis, Daylily.

== Facility ==
There are some Hotels.

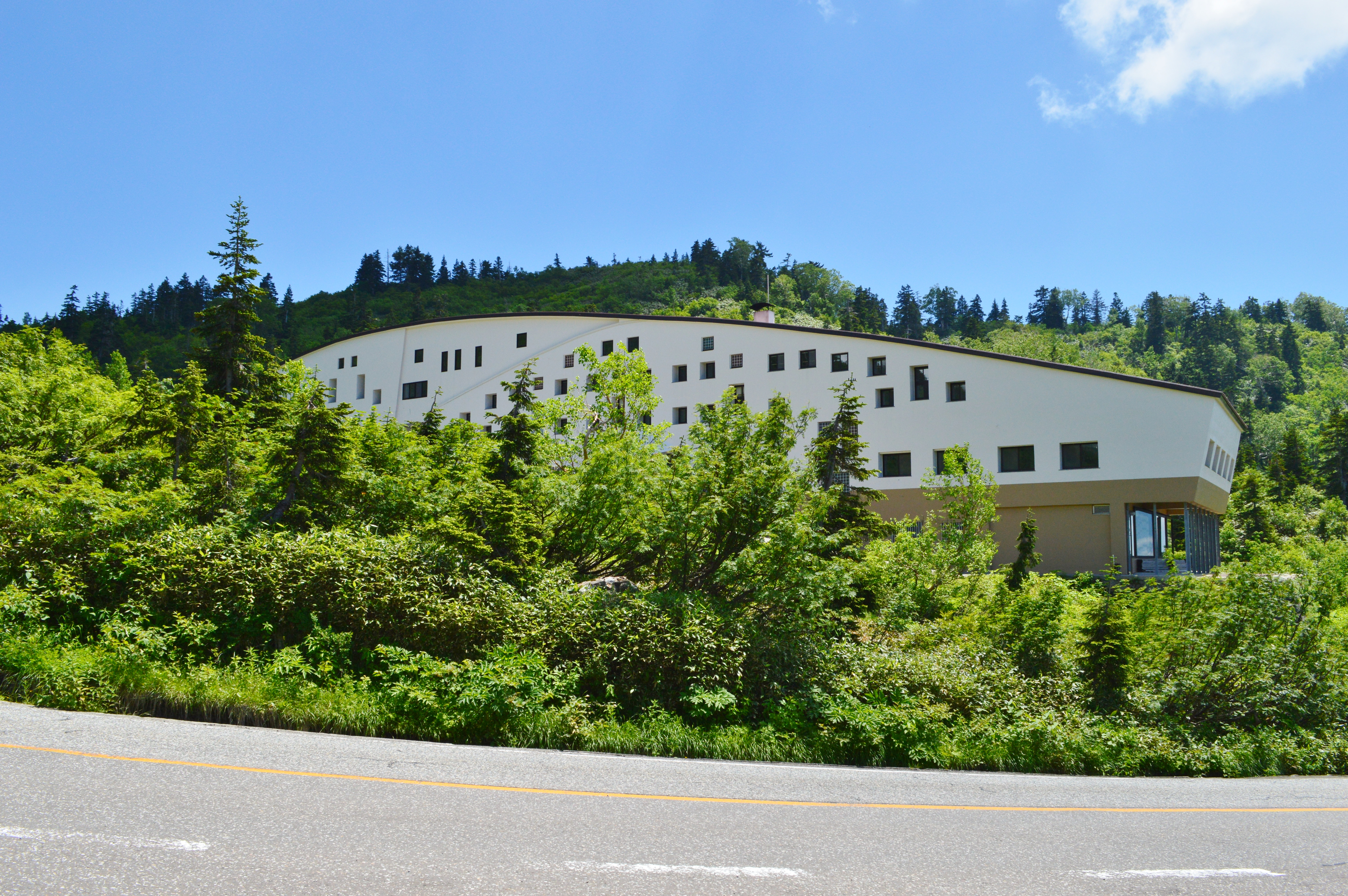
TATEYAMA SOU of National youth hostels

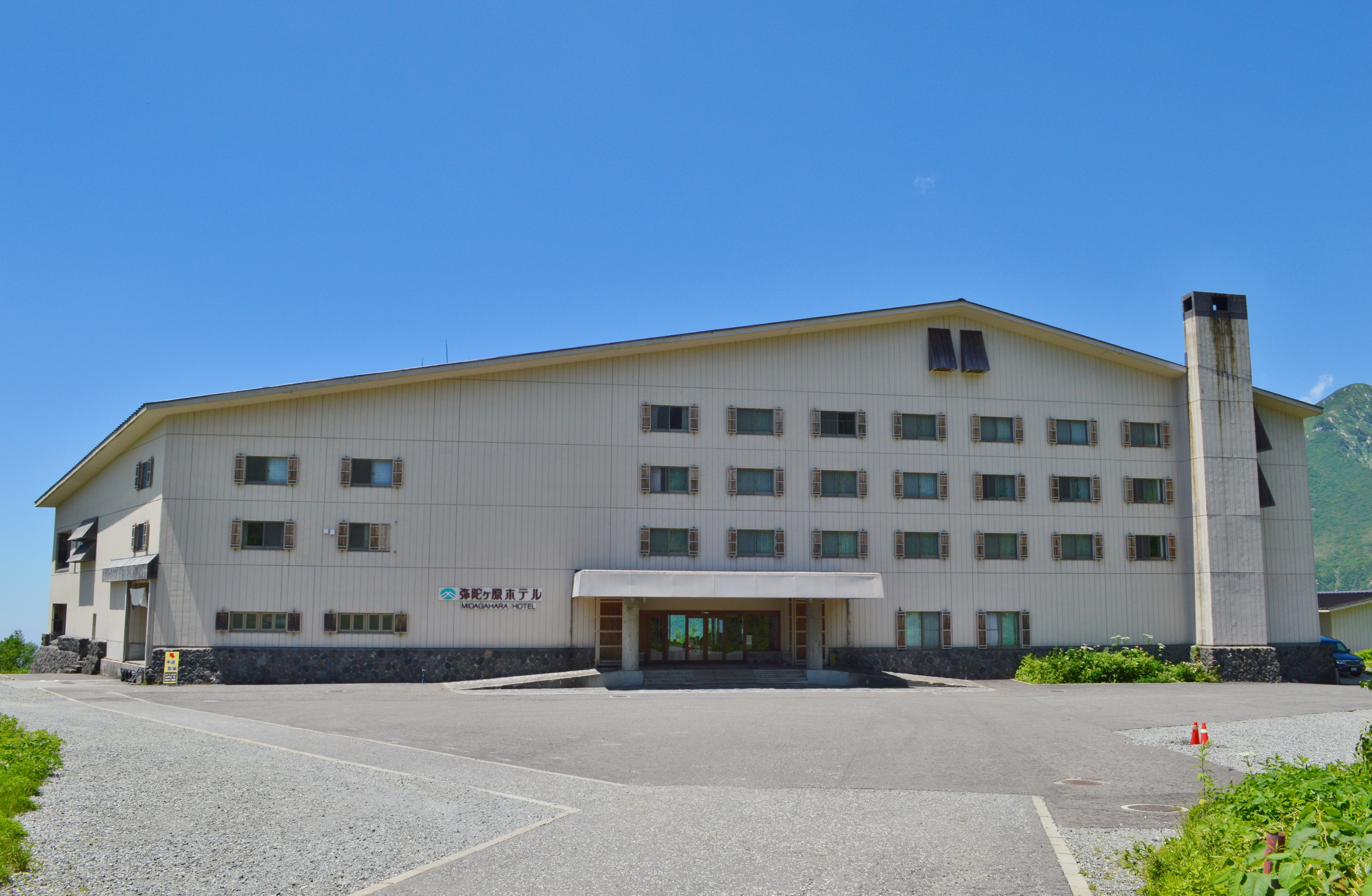
Midagahara Hotel

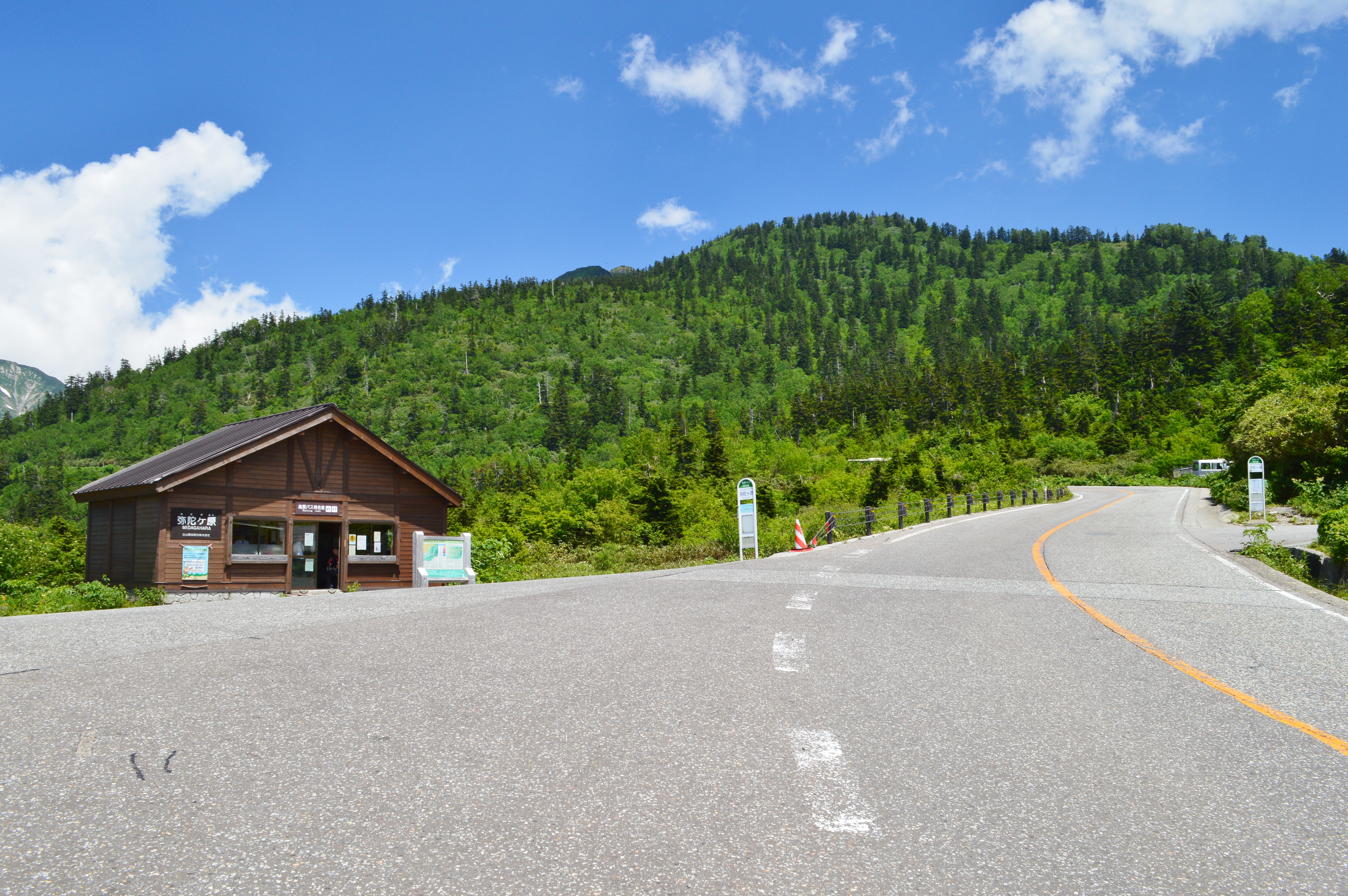
Midagahara bus stop

== Access ==
There are Midagahara bus stops between Bijodaira Station and Murodō Station on Tateyama Kurobe Alpine Route.

Private cars are not allowed to pass in Midagahara to protect the environment.

== See also ==
- List of volcanoes in Japan
- List of lakes in Japan

== See also ==
- Mount Tate
- Chūbu-Sangaku National Park
- Tateyama Kurobe Alpine Route
