= Chūbu-Sangaku National Park =

National Park in Chūbū, Japan

- 中部山岳国立公園; Chūbu-Sangaku Kokuritsu Kōen
- IUCN category II (national park)
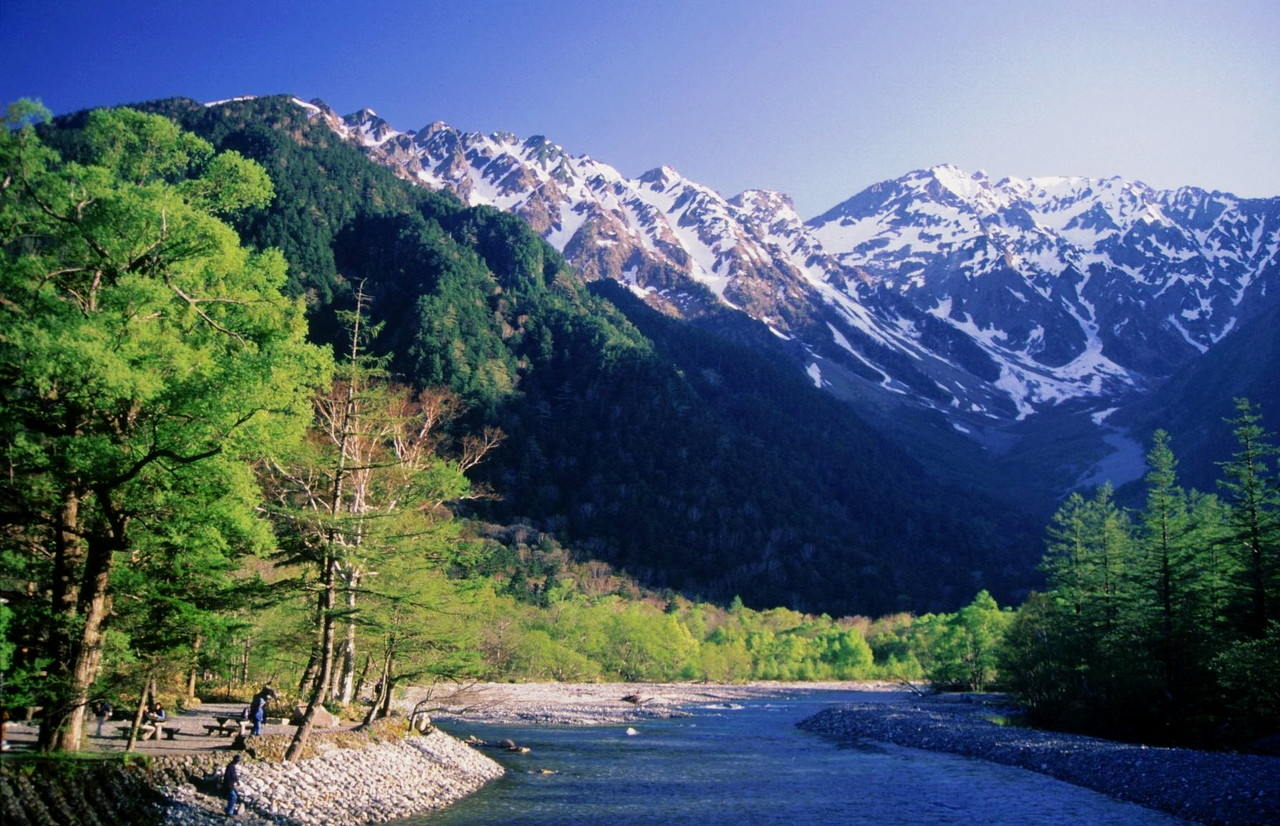
- Kamikochi and Mount Hotaka

- Location within Nagano Prefecture Location within Japan
- Location: Honshū, Japan
- Coordinates: 36°45′30″N 137°47′30″E
- Area: 1,743.23 square kilometres (673.06 mi^{2})
- Established: December 4, 1934
- Governing body: Ministry of the Environment (Japan)

Chūbu-Sangaku National Park (中部山岳国立公園, Chūbu Sangaku Kokuritsu Kōen) is a national park in the Chūbu region of Japan. It was established around the Hida Mountains and encompasses parts of Nagano, Gifu, Toyama and Niigata prefectures. It was designated a national park on December 4, 1934, along with Daisetsuzan National Park, Akan National Park, Nikkō National Park, and Aso Kujū National Park.

== Geography ==
The Hida Mountains, or Northern Alps make up the majority of the park. There are many points in the Hida Mountains within the park that are above 3,000 m (9,843 ft), including Kamikōchi, Mount Norikura, Mount Hotaka and Mount Tate. The park is home to numerous gorges, ravines, and dramatically shaped escarpments, as well as the headwater of Japan's longest river, the Shinano River, which begins here as the Azusa River on the southeastern slope of Mount Yari.

== Recreation ==
The Chūbu-Sangaku National Park has become the most important hiking area in Japan. Often tourists visit the nearby mountainous highland valley, Kamikochi.

== See also ==
- List of national parks of Japan
- Tateyama Kurobe Alpine Route
- Japanese Alps
- Tateyama, Toyama
- Midagahara
- Murodō Station
- Kurobe Gorge
- Kurobe Gorge Railway
- Kurobe dam
- Tourism in Japan
