= Tateyama Kurobe Alpine Route =

Sightseeing route in Japan

Tateyama Snow Walls -> Bijodaira Tenku Road
- Coordinates: 36.56955084306204°N 137.53195795984482°E

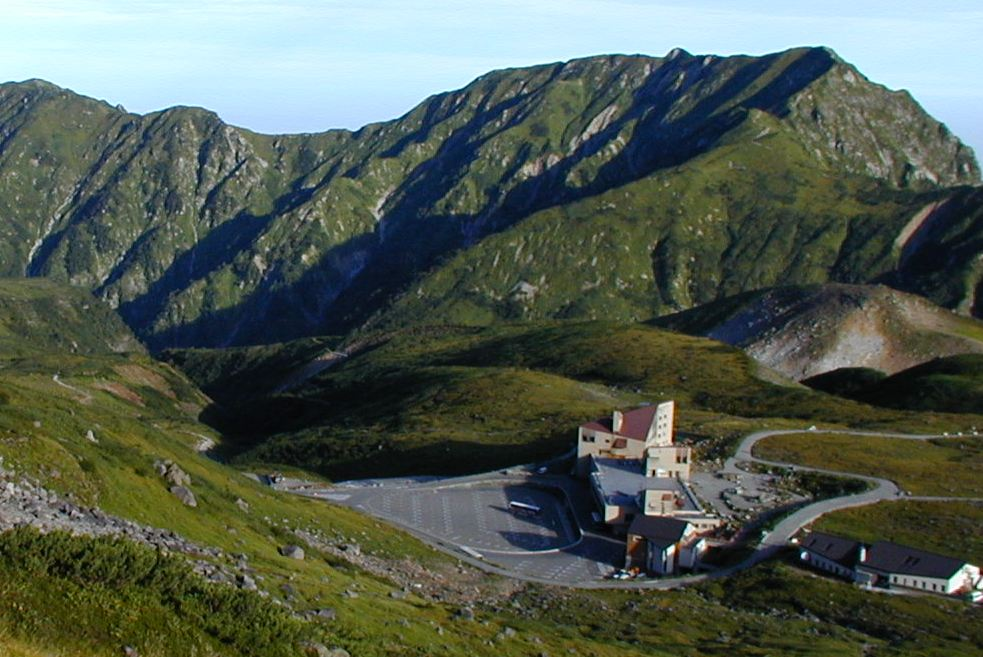
Murodō Station of Tateyama Tunnel trolley bus

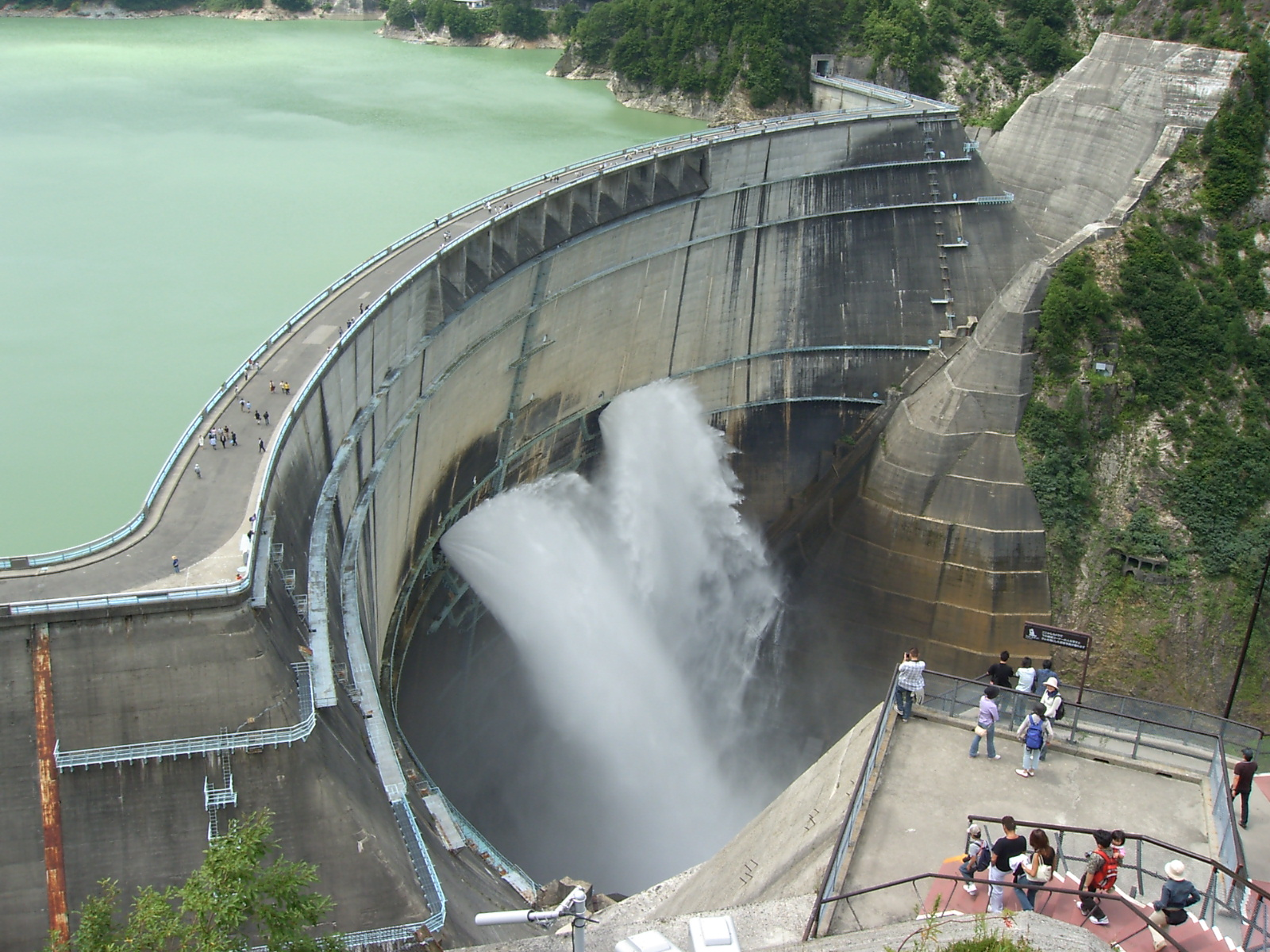
Kurobe dam

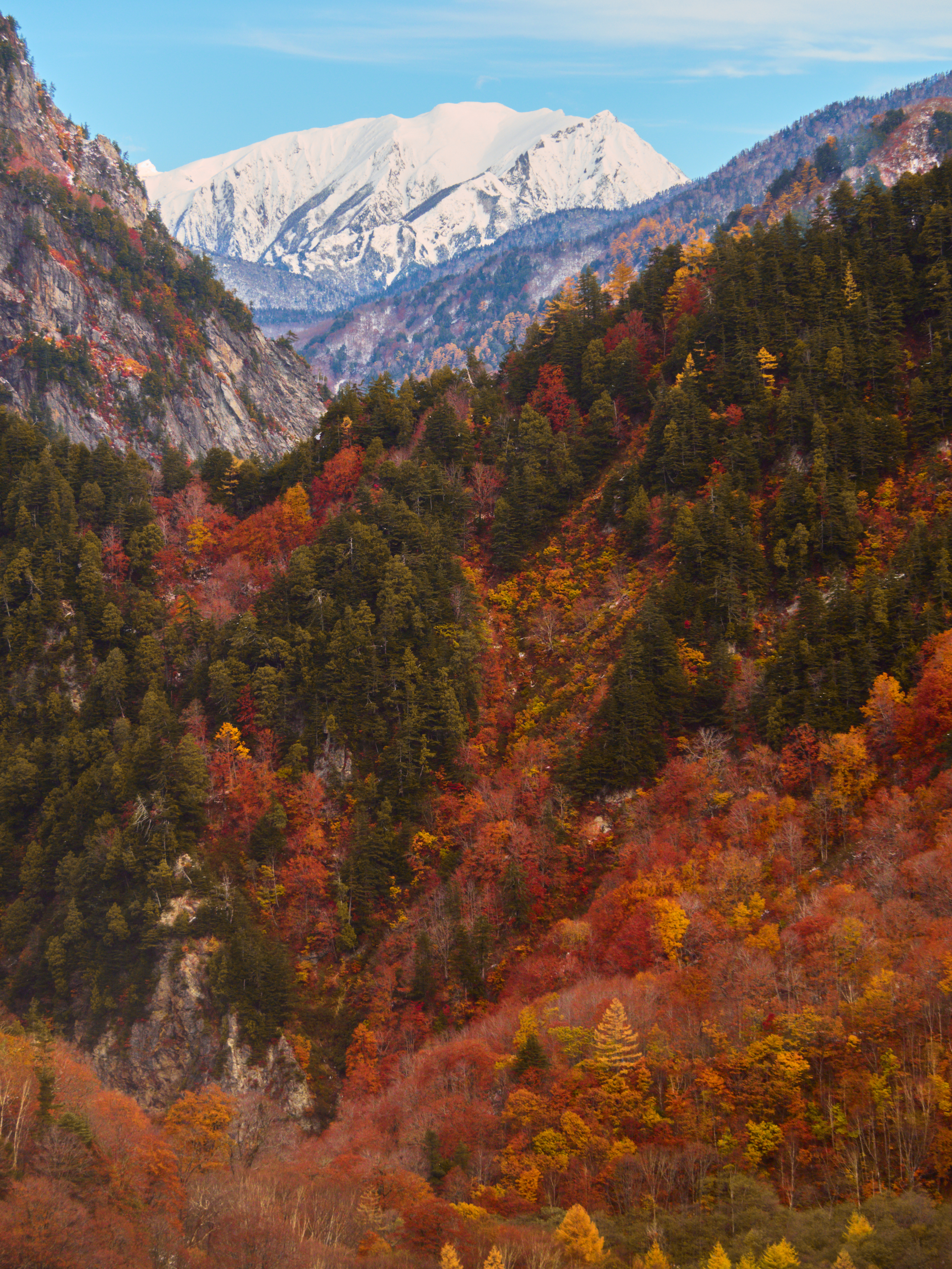
Kurobe Gorge in autumn

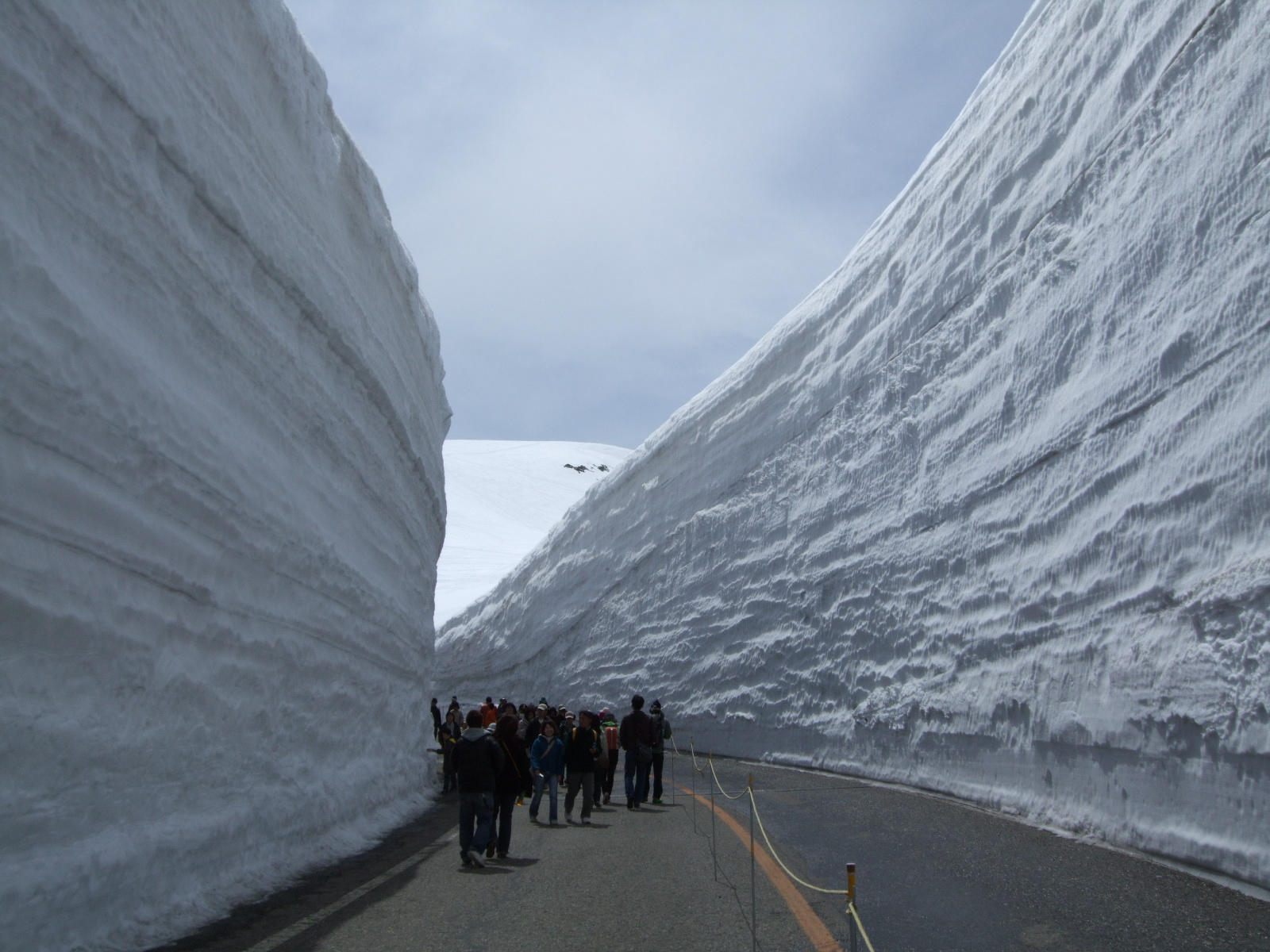
"Snow Walls"

The Tateyama Kurobe Alpine Route (立山黒部アルペンルート, Tateyama Kurobe Arupen Rūto) is a mountain sightseeing route between Tateyama, Toyama and Ōmachi, Nagano, Japan. Opened on June 1, 1971, it is 37 kilometres (23 miles) long, with a difference in elevation of as much as 1,975 metres (6,480 feet).

The Alpine Route goes through Tateyama (Mt. Tate) in the Hida Mountains with many scenic sites as well as walking trails, including Japan's largest dam, Kurobe Dam. Some stations have hotels around them and are used as bases for mountain climbing or trekking. From the top of the mountain, it is possible to see Mount Fuji on a clear day.

== Overview ==
The route is composed of seven different transportation services using five different modes: funicular, bus, trolleybus, aerial tramway, and walking. Three transport lines go through tunnels to protect them from snow: one funicular railway and two bus lines. One of the bus lines is the last trolleybus line in Japan, and the other was converted to all-electric buses in 2018. The bus lines are used because they do not exhaust fumes in the tunnels. During summer, shuttle buses between Toyama and Murodō are also available.

The Tateyama Kurobe Kankō (立山黒部貫光) operates most lines in the route. Its official abbreviation is TKK. The word kankō (貫光) was coined by Muneyoshi Saeki, the first president of the company. According to him, kan (貫) means "time-space", and kō (光) means "outer space", while kan (貫) also (normally) means "to penetrate", as in "to penetrate Tateyama Mountains" and kō (normally) means "light". The word is a homophone to kankō (観光; "sightseeing"), possibly intentionally.

== Lines and stations ==
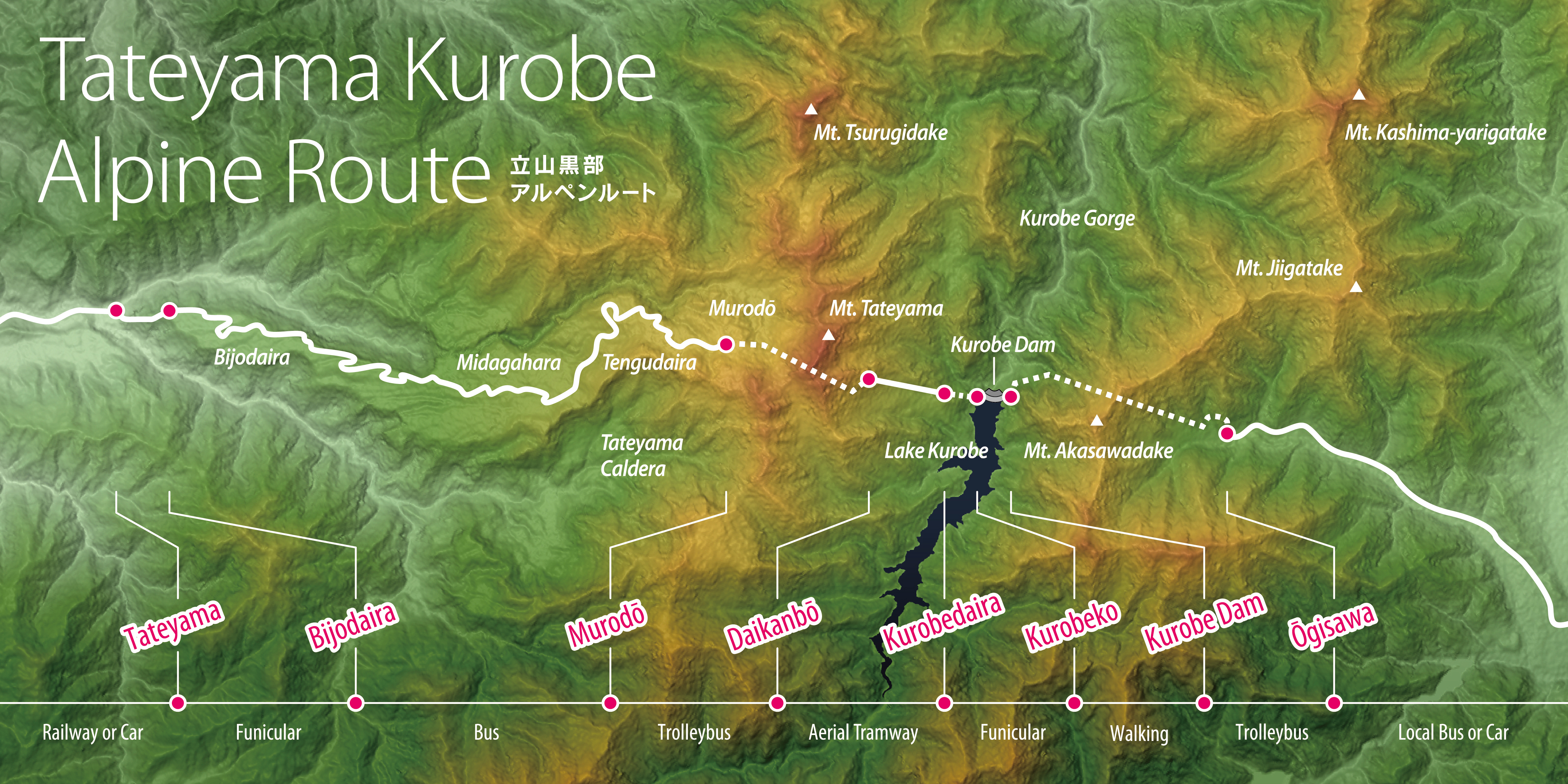

Transfer station / terminus	Japanese	Elevation	Transport mode	Line name	Distance	Location	
Dentetsu-Toyama	電鉄富山	7 m	Railway	Toyama Chiho Railway: Main Line, Tateyama Line ^{1}	34 km	Toyama	Toyama
Tateyama	立山	475 m	Railway	Toyama Chiho Railway: Main Line, Tateyama Line ^{1}	34 km	Tateyama	Toyama
Tateyama	立山	475 m	Funicular	TKK: Tateyama Cable Car	1.3 km	Tateyama	Toyama
Bijodaira	美女平	977 m	Funicular	TKK: Tateyama Cable Car	1.3 km	Tateyama	Toyama
Bijodaira	美女平	977 m	Bus	TKK: Tateyama Highland Bus	23 km	Tateyama	Toyama
Murodō	室堂	2,450 m	Bus	TKK: Tateyama Highland Bus	23 km	Tateyama	Toyama
Murodō	室堂	2,450 m	Trolleybus	TKK: Tateyama Tunnel Trolley Bus ^{2}	3.7 km	Tateyama	Toyama
Daikanbō	大観峰	2,316 m	Trolleybus	TKK: Tateyama Tunnel Trolley Bus ^{2}	3.7 km	Tateyama	Toyama
Daikanbō	大観峰	2,316 m	Aerial tramway	TKK: Tateyama Ropeway	1.7 km	Tateyama	Toyama
Kurobedaira	黒部平	1,828 m	Aerial tramway	TKK: Tateyama Ropeway	1.7 km	Tateyama	Toyama
Kurobedaira	黒部平	1,828 m	Funicular	TKK: Kurobe Cable Car ^{2}	0.8 km	Tateyama	Toyama
Kurobeko	黒部湖	1,455 m	Funicular	TKK: Kurobe Cable Car ^{2}	0.8 km	Tateyama	Toyama
Kurobeko	黒部湖	1,455 m	Walking	(15 minutes walk on Kurobe dam)		Tateyama	Toyama
Kurobe Dam	黒部ダム	1,455 m	Walking	(15 minutes walk on Kurobe dam)		Tateyama	Toyama
Kurobe Dam	黒部ダム	1,455 m	Electric bus	Kansai Electric Power Company: Kanden Tunnel Electric Bus ^{3}	6.1 km	Tateyama	Toyama
Ōgisawa	扇沢	1,433 m	Electric bus	Kansai Electric Power Company: Kanden Tunnel Electric Bus ^{3}	6.1 km	Ōmachi	Nagano
Ōgisawa	扇沢	1,433 m	Bus	Kawanakajima Bus, Kita Alps Kōtsū, and Matsumoto Electric Railway: Ōmachi Alpine Line Bus ^{1}	18 km	Ōmachi	Nagano
Shinano-Ōmachi	信濃大町	713 m	Bus	Kawanakajima Bus, Kita Alps Kōtsū, and Matsumoto Electric Railway: Ōmachi Alpine Line Bus ^{1}	18 km	Ōmachi	Nagano

^{1}: Sometimes considered as a part of the route. However, most guided tours use chartered buses for this section.
^{2}: The line runs entirely in a tunnel.
^{3}: The line is mostly in a tunnel and operated with trolleybuses until November 2018.

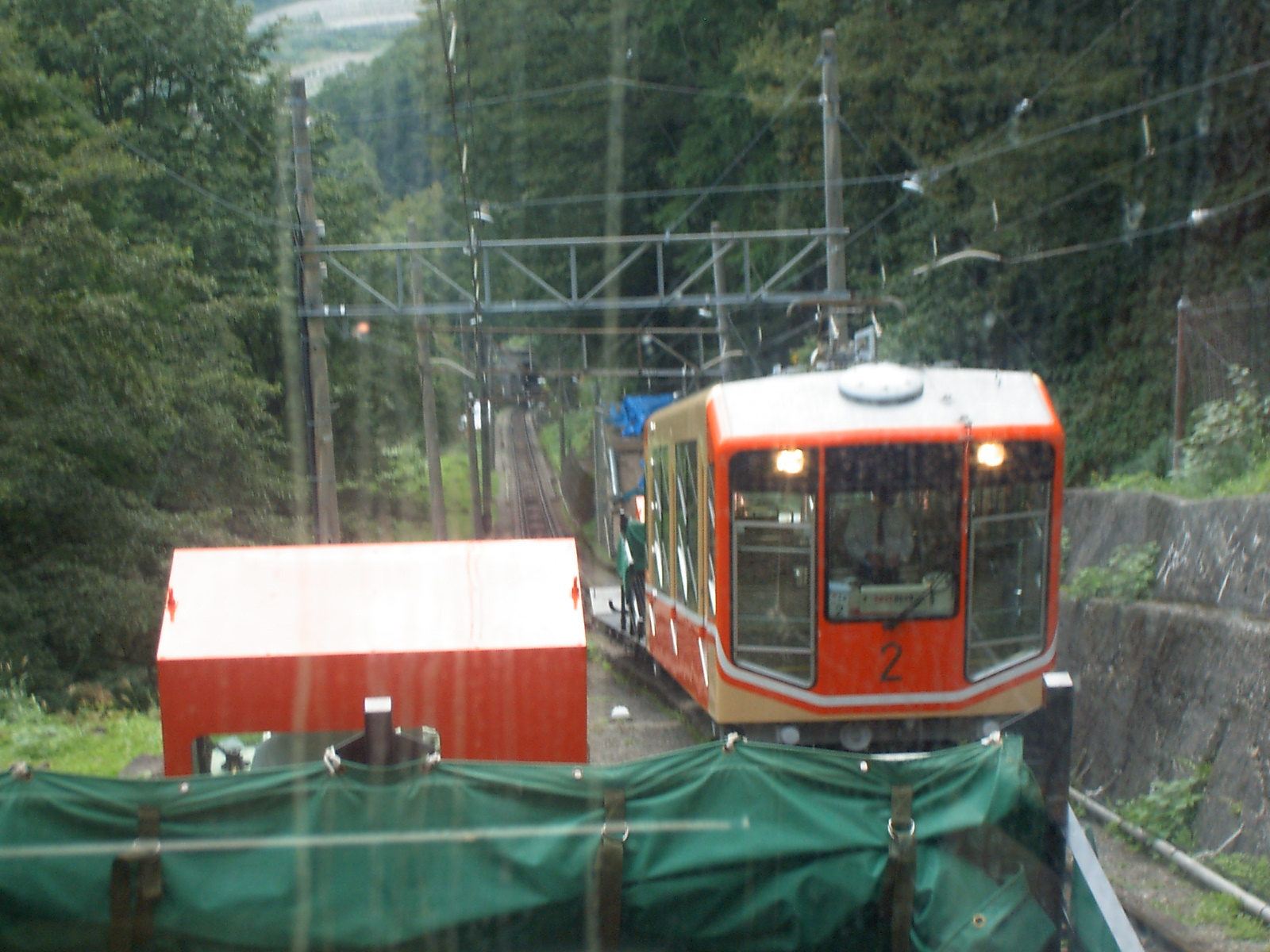
Tateyama cable car

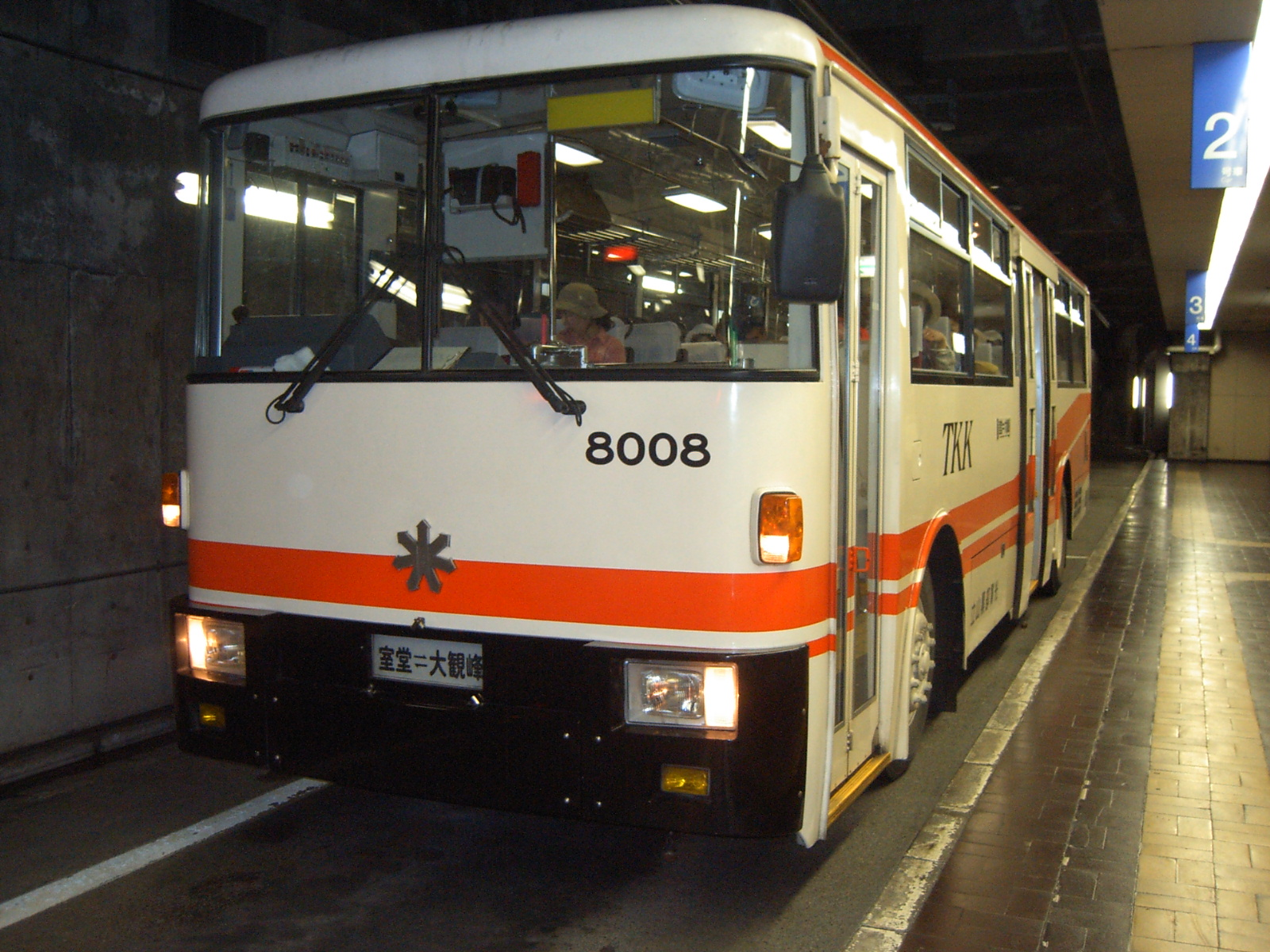
Tateyama Tunnel trolley bus

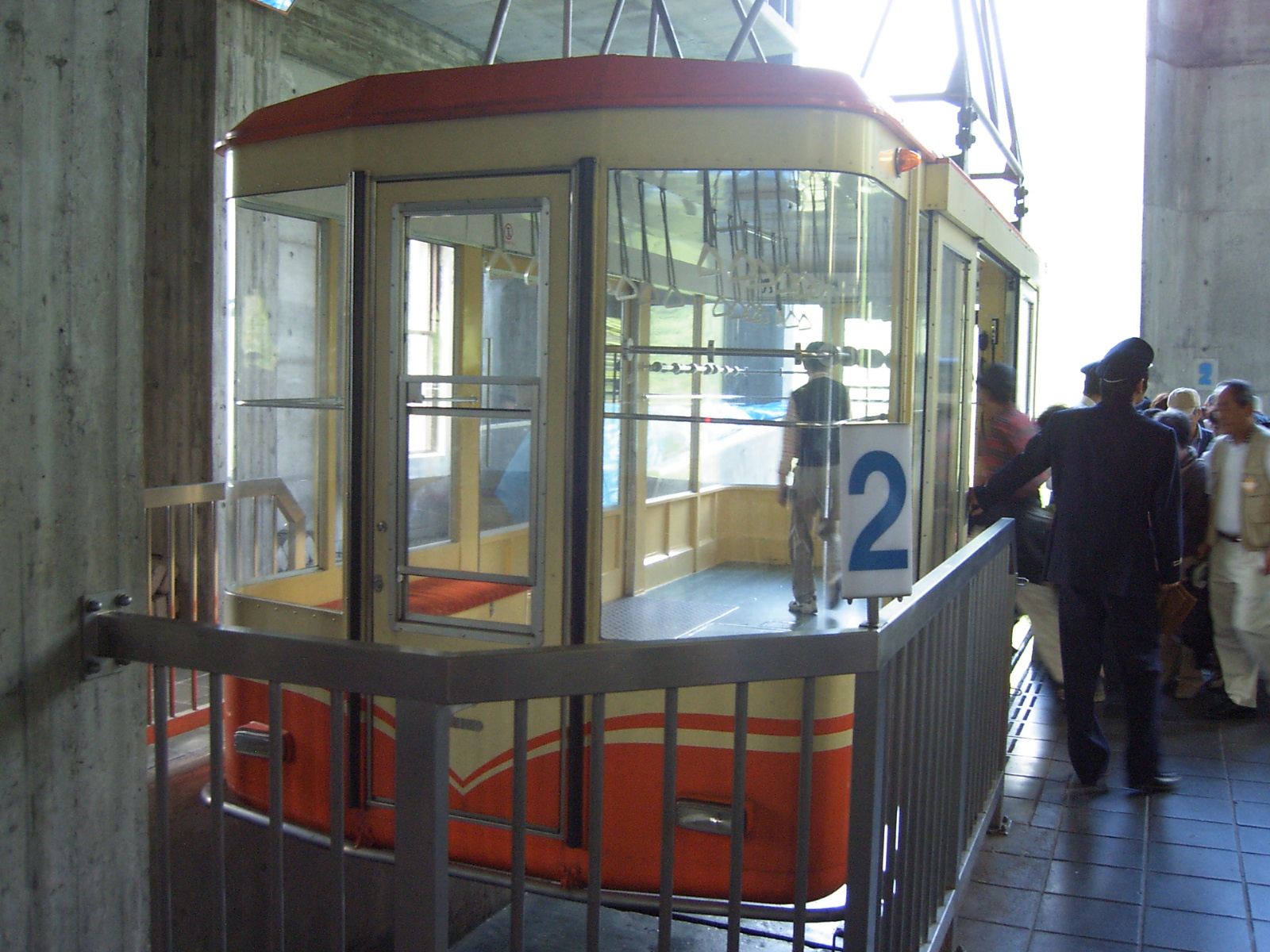
Tateyama ropeway

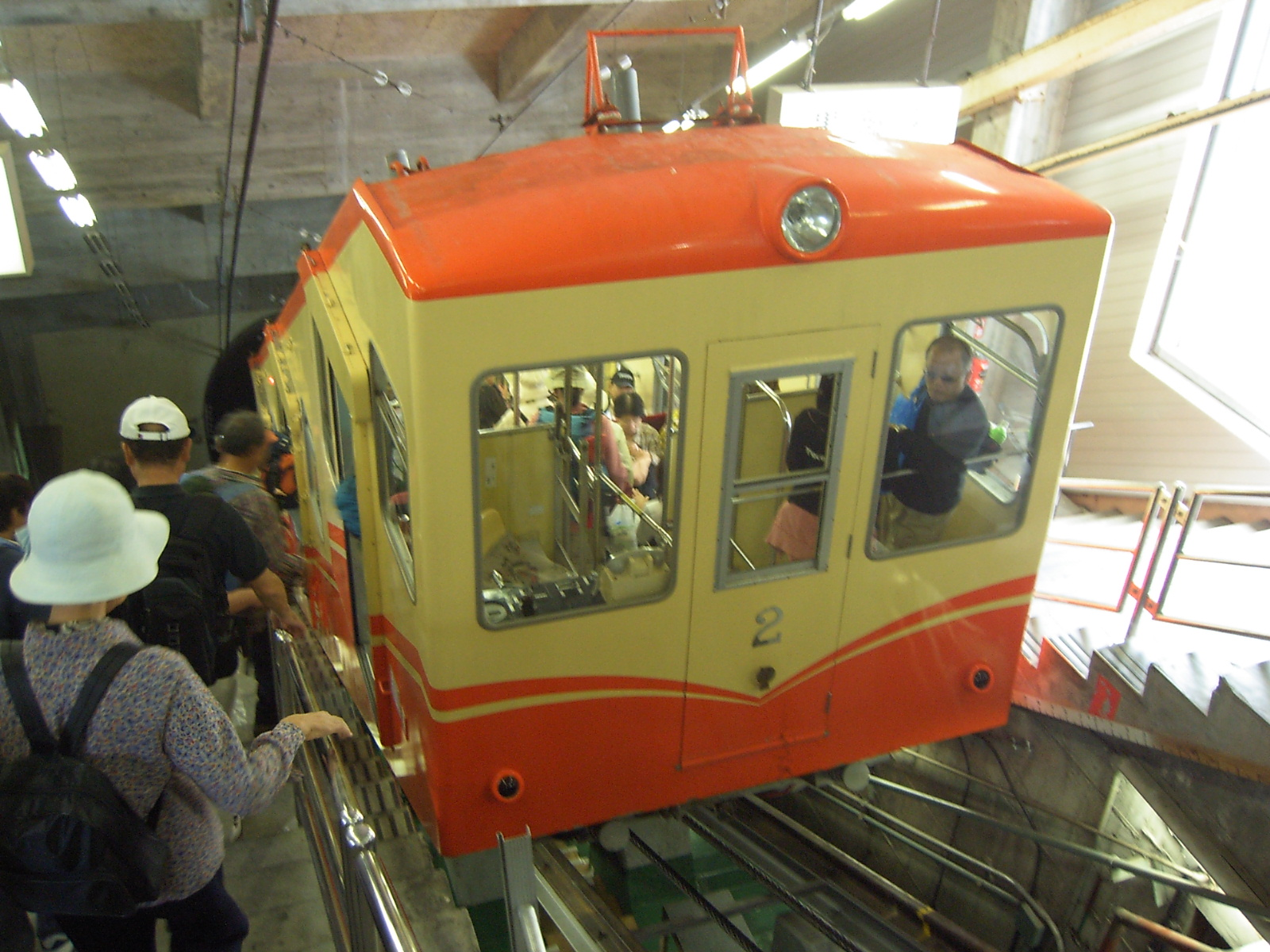
Kurobe cable car

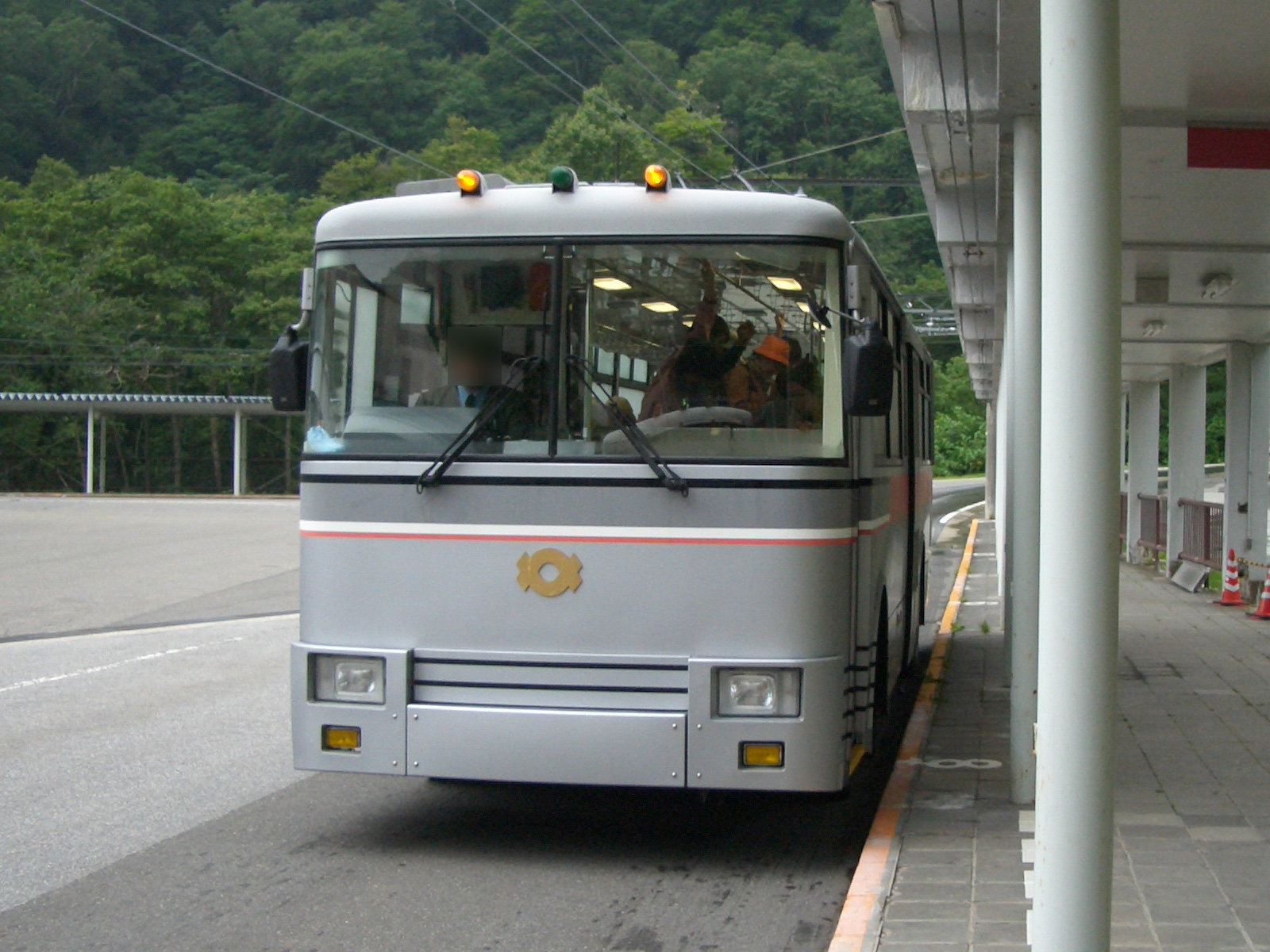
Kanden Tunnel trolley bus

== Sights ==
The Tateyama Kurobe Alpine Route involves many sights and attractions for visitors, including:

- The Oyama Shrine, near the Oyama Peak. This peak is better known but it is not the highest point of the mountain (Onanjiyama).
- A shopping area and onsen bath on Murodo Plateau. The onsen on Tateyama is famous for its use of sulfur spring water for the bath. There are also several hiking and walking paths that visitors can take through Hell's Valley (Jigokudani) and the other valleys. As with many volcanic areas in Japan of the same name, people cannot walk within the sulfur valley due to gas-related safety concerns.
- The snow walls called Yukino-ōtani, which are present from mid-April to June, and which tower anywhere from 15 to 20 meters high (roughly 50 to 65 feet). They flank the road leading to Murodo Station. There are many charter services from Taipei, Incheon and Thailand during the high season to reach Murodo at this time.
- The Kurobe Dam, which stands at 186 meters (610 feet), making it the tallest dam in Japan. From Murodō Station, visitors should take the Tateyama Tunnel Trolleybus (10 minutes), followed by the Tateyama Ropeway (7 minutes), and finally the Kurobe Cable Car (5 minutes).

Midagahara is a flat walking area filled with flowing plains interrupted by blue ponds. Near the bus stop that returns visitors to Bijodaira back down the mountain is a slightly hidden walking path. Midagahara is accessible from Tateyama Station via the Tateyama Cable Car (7 minutes) followed by Tateyama Kurobe Alpine Route bus (about 40 minutes) that goes in the direction of Murodō Station.

Shōmyō Falls (the tallest waterfall in Japan) is visible across the valley while traveling along the main road from Tateyama Station to the Murodo Plateau.

The section between Kurobe Dam and Ōgisawa was originally made for construction of the dam, while the section between Tateyama and Kurobeko was for tourists from the beginning.

Today, the entire route serves exclusively as a scenic sightseeing journey through the Japanese Alps, popular with tourists. Most travelers complete the route in one direction, either east to west or vice versa. It can be done in a single day or at a more relaxed pace, with an overnight stay at one of the lodges or hotels along the way.

== Gallery ==
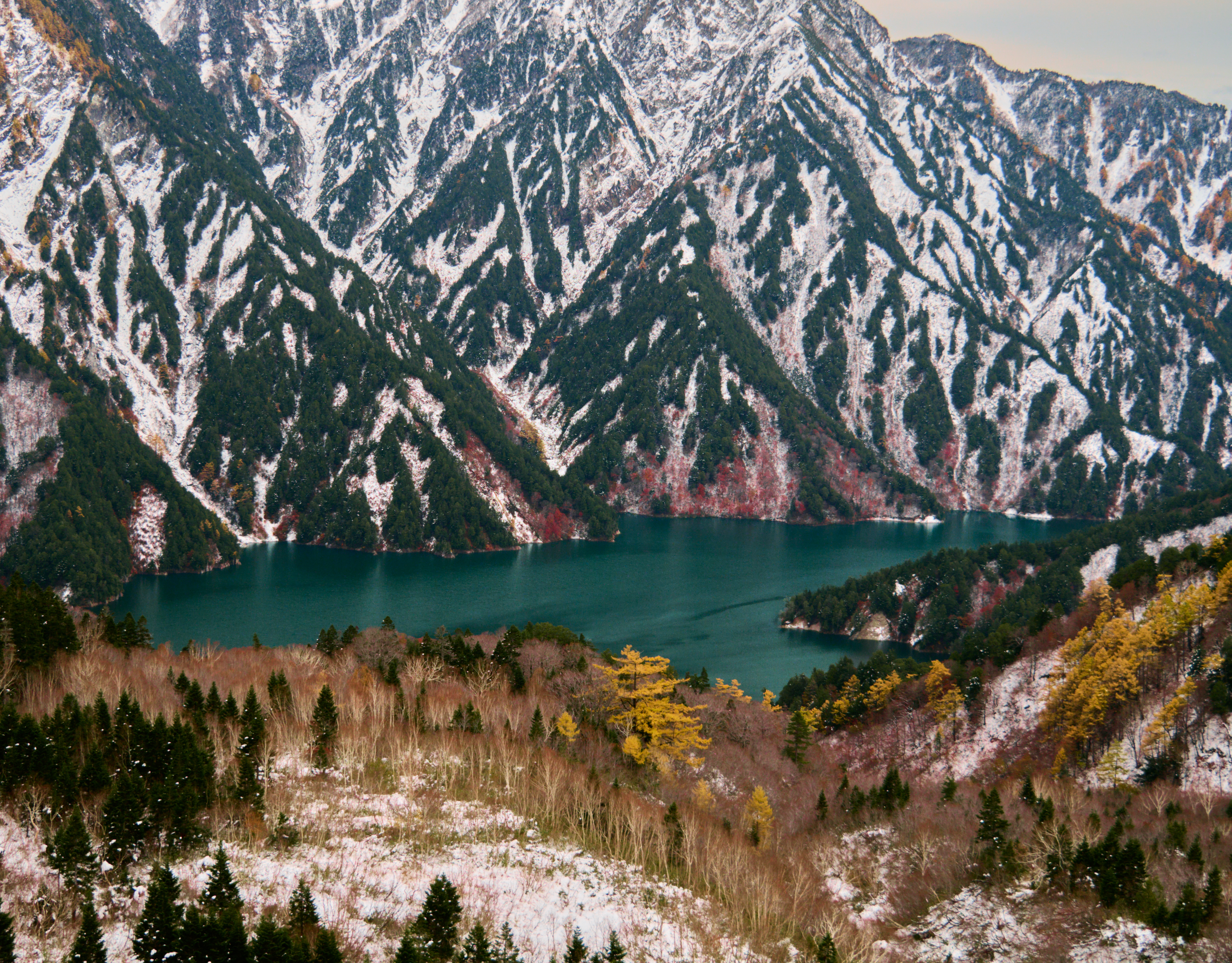
Lake Kurobe in autumn

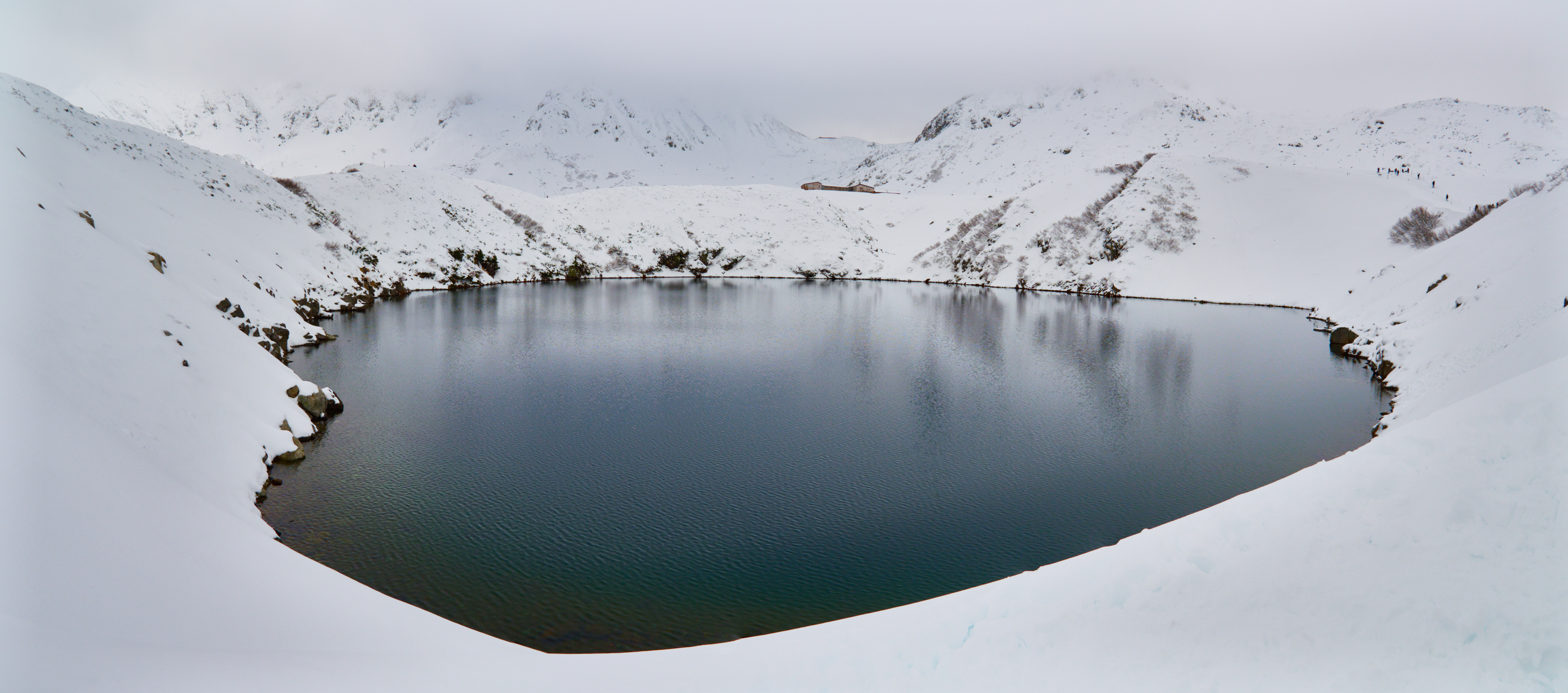
Murodo Mikurigaike in early winter

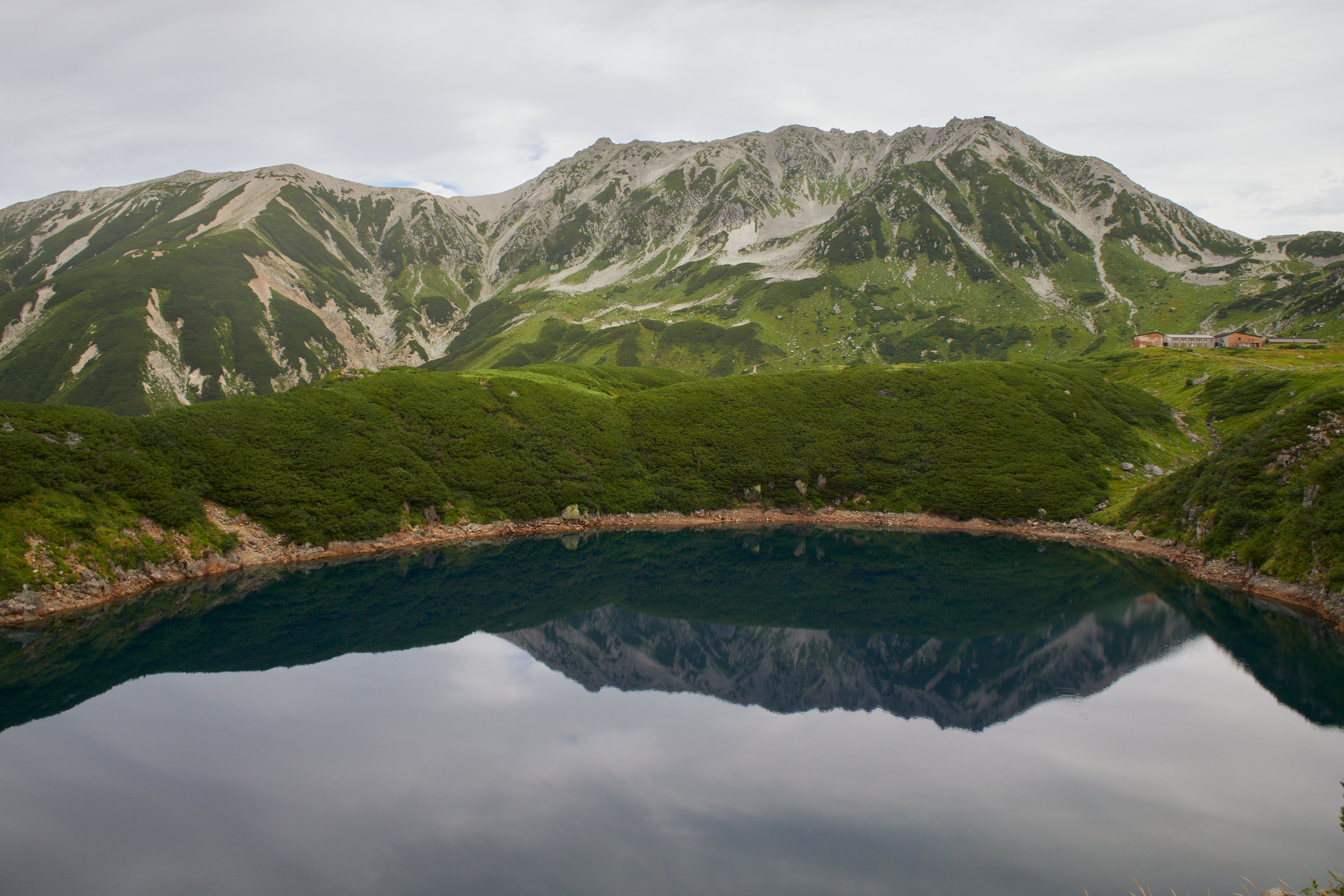
Murodo Murodo Mikurigaike in summer, with Mt. Tate in the background

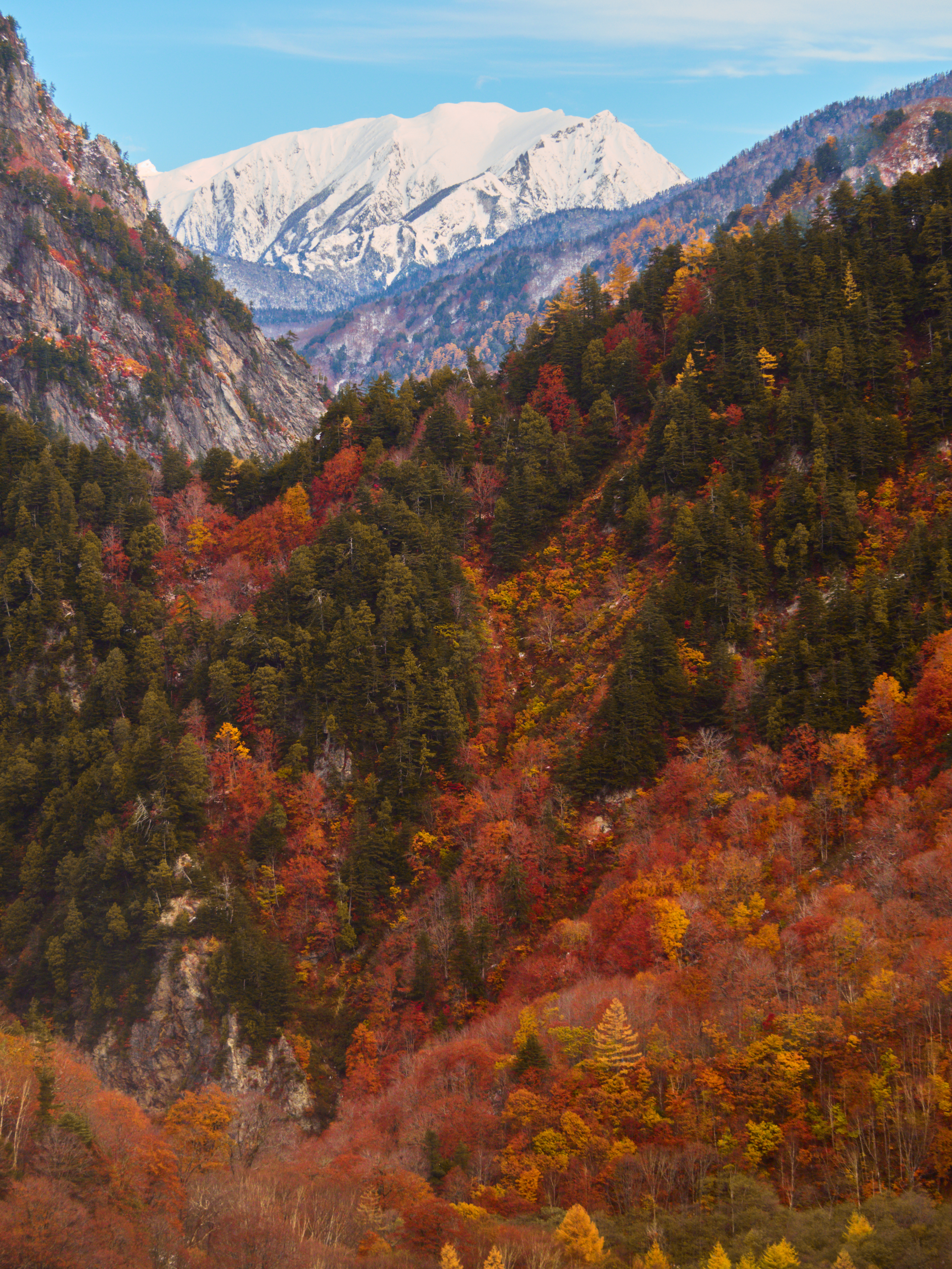
Kurobe Gorge in autumn

== See also ==
- Chūbu-Sangaku National Park
- Kurobe Senyō Railway
- Tourism in Japan
