= Senyo =

Senyo may refer to:

- Sényő, a village in the Northern Great Plain region of eastern Hungary
- Senyo Kogyo, Ltd., Japanese entertainment group and giant Ferris wheel constructor
- Kurobe Senyō Railway, in Toyama Prefecture, Japan
