= Kurobe Cable Car =

Japanese funicular line in Tateyama, Toyama

Coordinates: 36°34′0.6″N 137°39′16.3″E

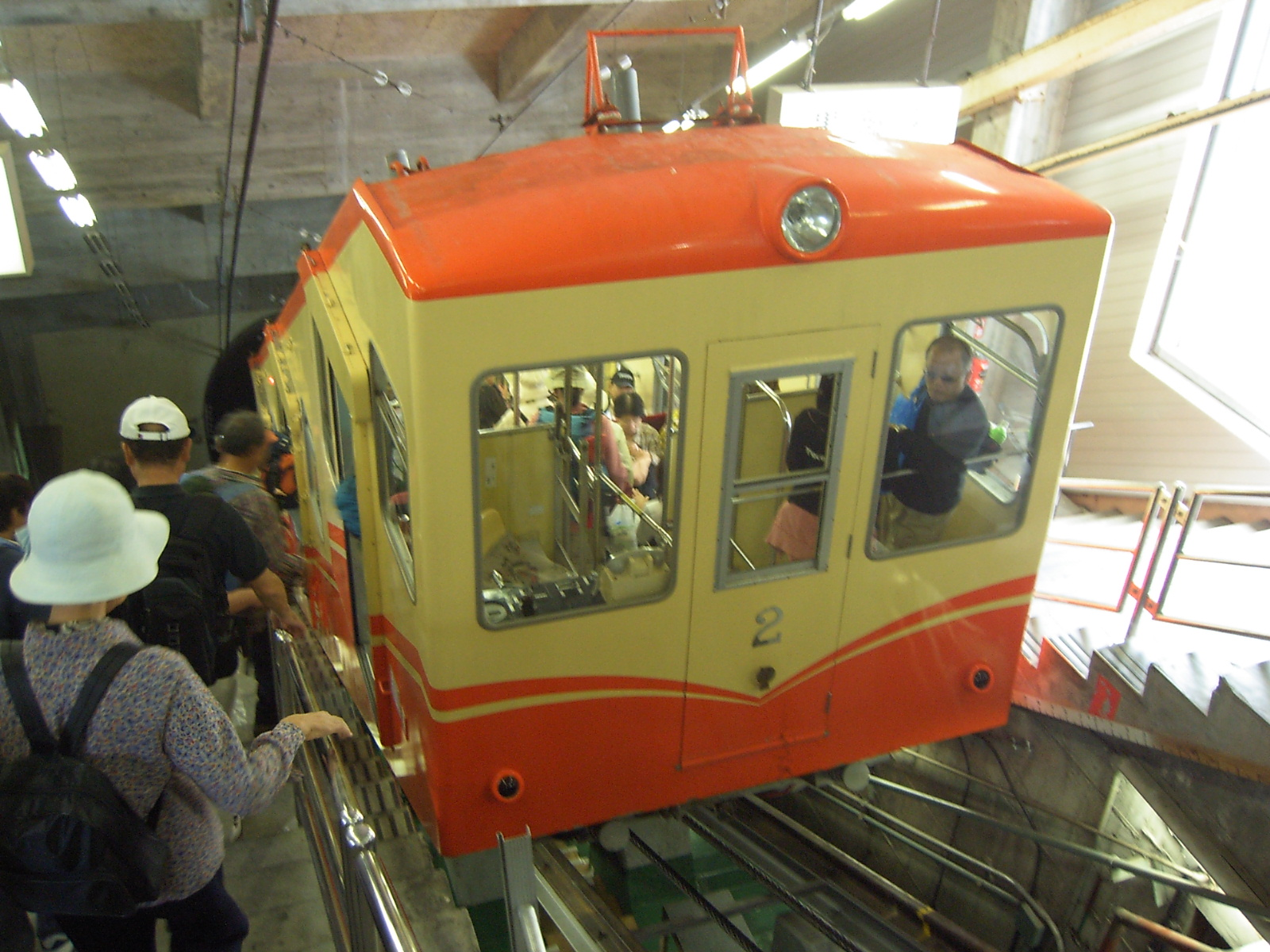
Kurobe Cable Car funicular

The Kurobe Cable Car (黒部ケーブルカー, Kurobe Kēburukā), officially the Cable Line (鋼索線, Kōsaku-sen), is a Japanese funicular line in Tateyama, Toyama, operated by Tateyama Kurobe Kankō. The company also operates another funicular with the same official name. The line is a part of Tateyama Kurobe Alpine Route. The line goes entirely under a tunnel to protect it from snow. It opened in 1969.

== Basic data ==
- Distance: 0.8 km (0.5 mi)
- Gauge: 1,067 mm (3 ft 6 in)
- Stations: 2
- Vertical interval: 373 m (1,224 ft)

== See also ==
- Mount Tate
- List of funicular railways
- List of railway lines in Japan
