= Murodō Station =

Trolleybus station in Japan

Coordinates: 36.5773°N 137.5955°E

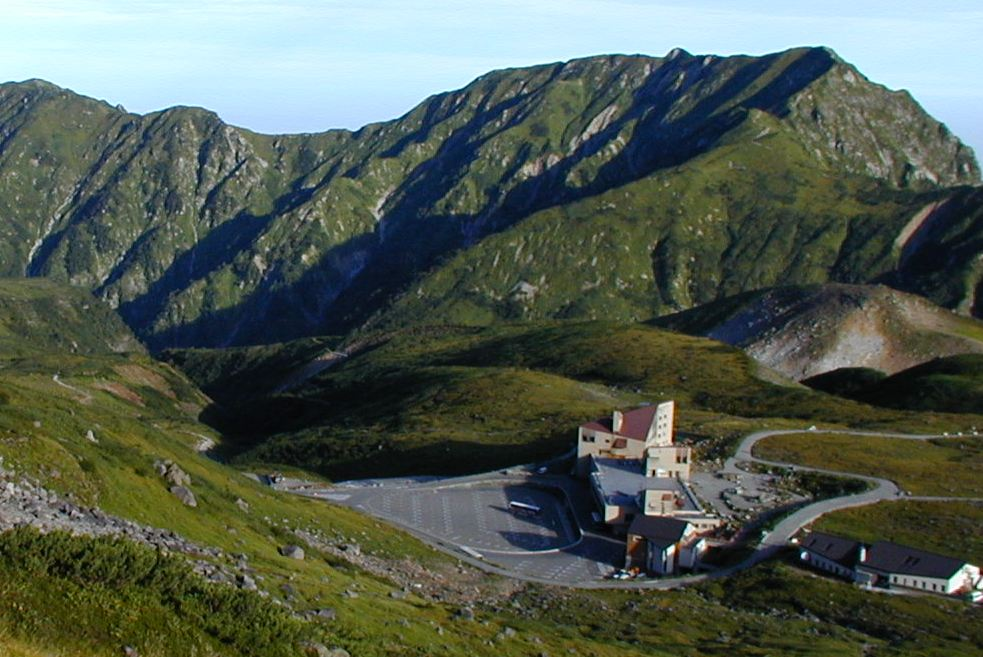
Murodo Station

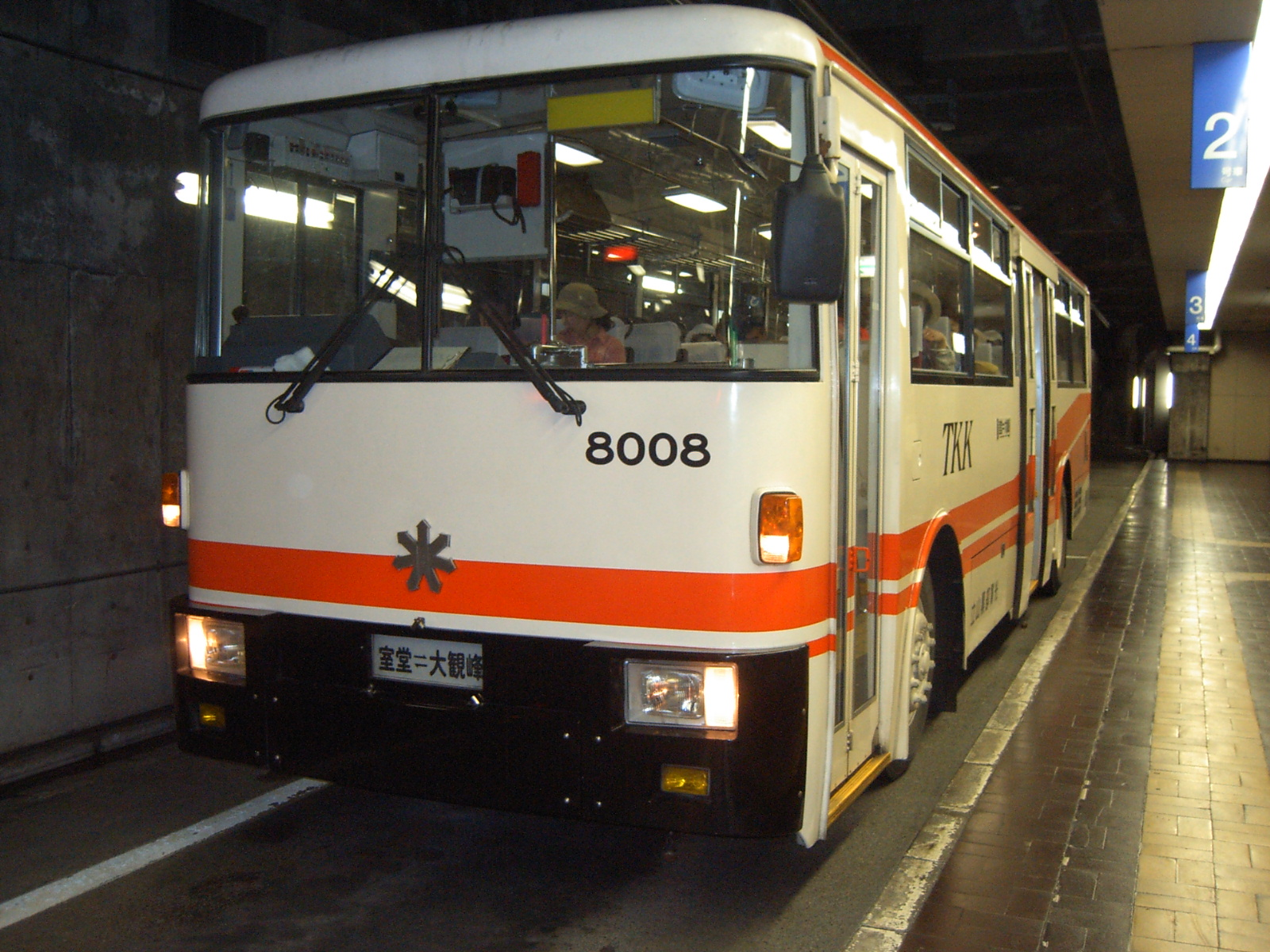
Tateyama Tunnel Trolley Bus at Murodo Station

Murodō Station (室堂駅, Murodō-eki) is a trolleybus station in Tateyama, Toyama, Japan. It is situated on the Murodō Plateau, 2,400m above sea level.

Murodō is the main station providing access to the Japanese Alps, including Mount Tate and Mount Tsurugi.

== History ==
April 25, 1971: The station opened. At that time, it was operated by diesel buses and was positioned as a bus terminal.

April 23, 1996: The buses were converted to trolleybuses, and the tunnel became a station under the Railway Business Act.

December 1, 2024: Due to the conversion of the Tateyama Tunnel trolleybuses to electric buses, it will cease operating as a railway station.

== Lines ==
- Tateyama Kurobe Kankō
  - Tateyama Tunnel Trolley Bus (Tateyama Kurobe Alpine Route)

== Adjacent stations ==
«	Service	»
Tateyama Tunnel Trolley Bus
Terminus	-	Daikanbō
