= Tateyama Ropeway =

Japanese aerial lift line in Tateyama, Toyama, Japan

Coordinates: 36°34′6.1″N 137°38′27.9″E

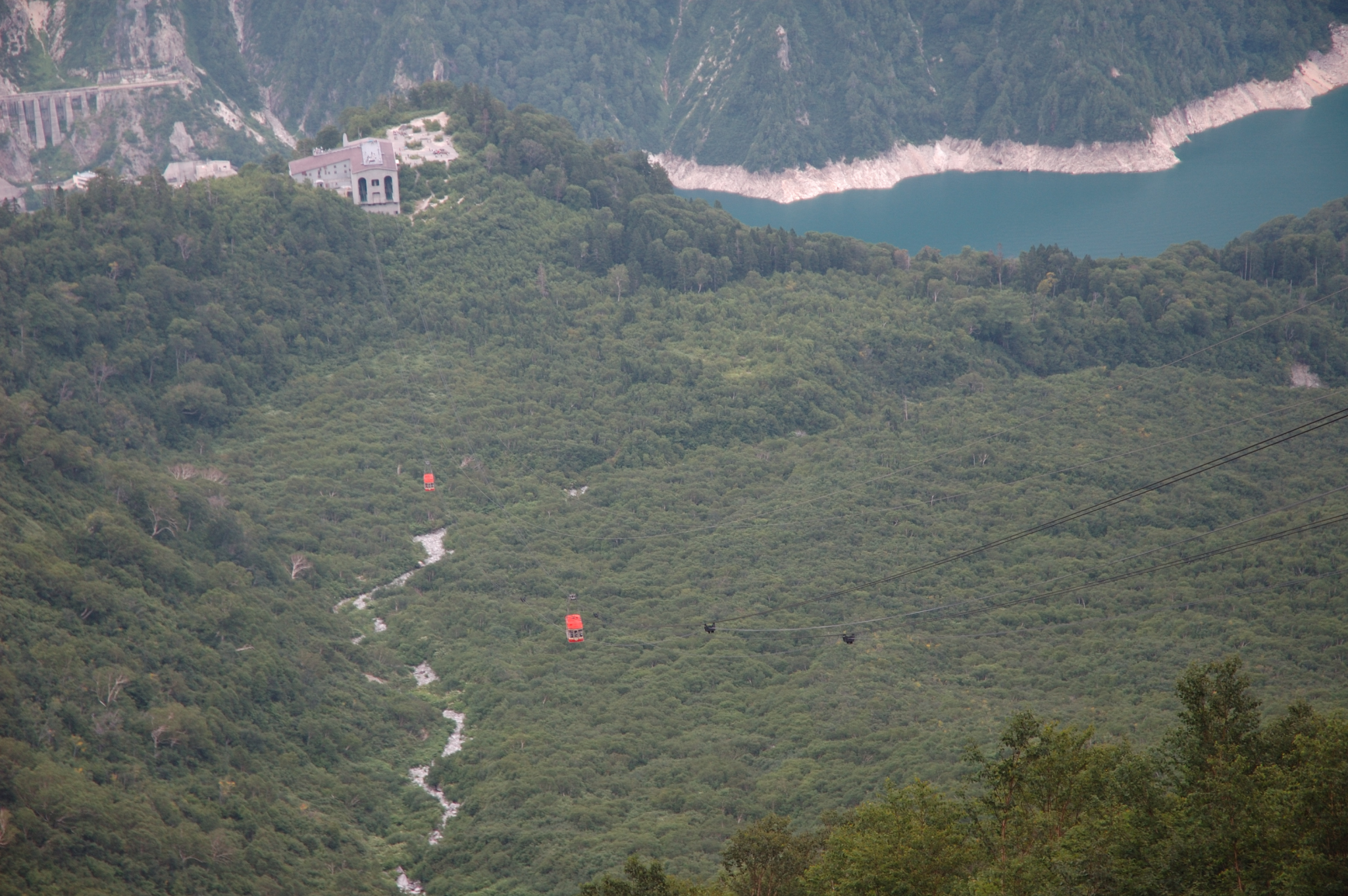
Tateyama Ropeway.

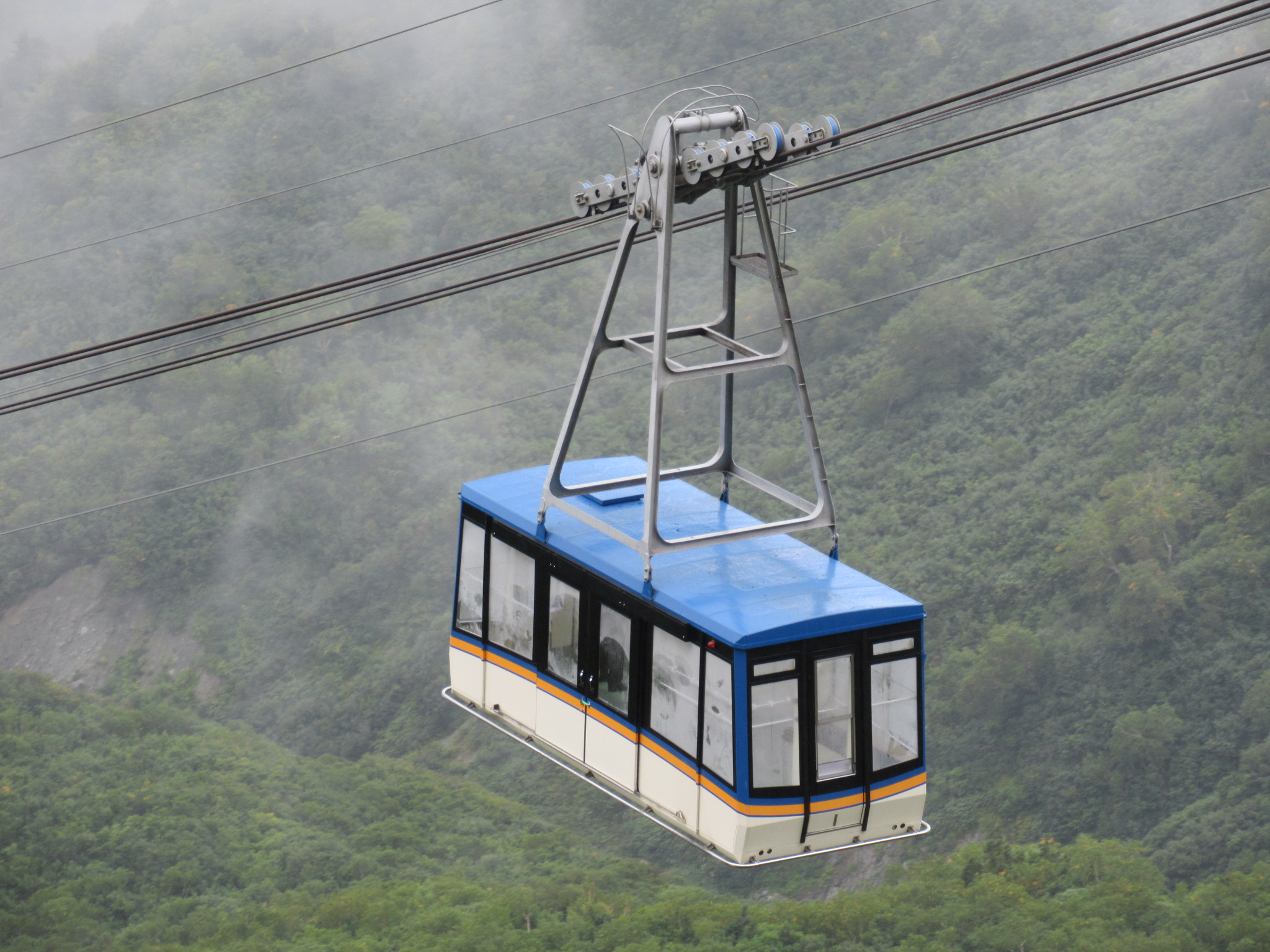
Close up on one of the cabins.

The Tateyama Ropeway (立山ロープウェイ, Tateyama Rōpuwei) is a Japanese aerial lift line in Tateyama, Toyama, operated by Tateyama Kurobe Kankō. The line, opened in 1970, makes a part of Tateyama Kurobe Alpine Route. It is famous for being the single span line without any aerial lift pylon.

== Basic data ==
- System: Aerial tramway
- Cable length: 1.7 kilometres (1.1 mi)
- Distance: 1.7 kilometres (1.1 mi)
- Vertical interval: 488 m (1,601 ft)
- Passenger capacity per a cabin: 80
- Stations: 2
- Time required for single ride: 7 minutes

== See also ==
- Tateyama Kurobe Alpine Route
- List of aerial lifts in Japan
