= Yoshihisa =

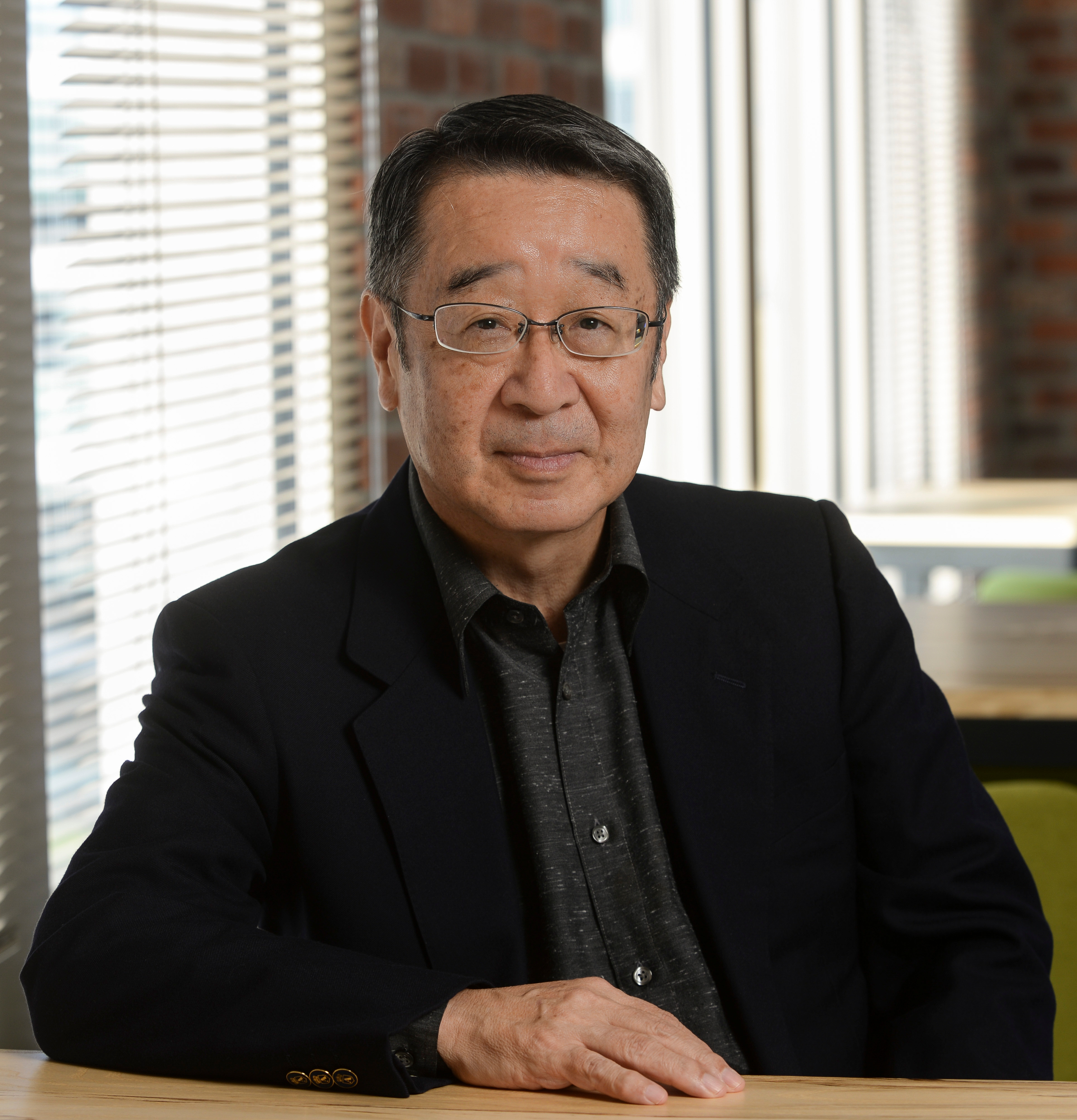
- Yoshihisa Yamamoto, director of Physics & Informatics Laboratories (PHI Labs)
- Pronunciation: joɕiçisa (IPA)
- Gender: Male

Origin
- Origin: Japanese
- Meaning: Different meanings depending on the kanji used

Other names
- Alternative spelling: Yosihisa (Kunrei-shiki) Yosihisa (Nihon-shiki) Yoshihisa (Hepburn)

Yoshihisa is a masculine Japanese given name.

== Written forms ==
Yoshihisa can be written using many different combinations of kanji characters. Here are some examples:

- 義久, "justice, long time"
- 義尚, "justice, still"
- 吉久, "good luck, long time"
- 吉尚, "good luck, still"
- 善久, "virtuous, long time"
- 善尚, "virtuous, still"
- 芳久, "virtuous/fragrant, long time"
- 芳尚, "virtuous/fragrant, still"
- 良久, "good, long time"
- 良尚, "good, still"
- 喜久, "rejoice, long time"
- 慶久, "congratulate, long time"
- 嘉久, "excellent, long time"

The name can also be written in hiragana よしひさ or katakana ヨシヒサ.

== Notable people with the name ==
- Yoshihisa Amago (尼子 義久; 1540–1610), Japanese warlord
- Yoshihisa Ashikaga (足利 義尚; 1465–1489), Japanese shōgun
- Prince Kitashirakawa Yoshihisa (北白川宮 能久親王; 1847–1895), Japanese prince and general
- Yoshihisa Shimazu (島津 義久; 1533–1611), Japanese daimyō
- Yoshihisa Furukawa (古川 禎久; born 1965), Japanese politician
- Yoshihisa Hirano (平野 義久; born 1971), Japanese composer
- Yoshihisa Kishimoto (岸本 良久; born 1961), Japanese video game developer
- Yoshihisa Taira (平 義久; 1937–2005), Japanese-born French composer
- Yoshihisa Hirano (baseball) (平野 佳寿; born 1984), Japanese baseball player
- Yoshihisa Inoue (井上 義久; born 1947), Japanese politician
- Yoshihisa Ishida (石田 義久; born 1944), Japanese shot putter and hammer thrower
- Yoshihisa Miyaji (宮地 由久; born 1973), Japanese weightlifter
- Yoshihisa Naruse (成瀬 善久; born 1985), Japanese baseball player
- Yoshihisa Yamamoto (scientist) (山本 喜久; born 1950), Japanese scientist and engineer
- Yoshihisa Yamamoto (wrestler) (山本 宜久, born 1970), Japanese mixed martial artist and professional wrestler
- Yoshihisa Yoshikawa (吉川 貴久; born 1936), Japanese sport shooter

== See also ==
- Yoshihisa Station, a city tram station on the Takaoka Kidō Line located in Takaoka, Toyama Prefecture, Japan
- Shin Yoshihisa Station, a city tram station on the Takaoka Kidō Line located in Takaoka, Toyama Prefecture, Japan
