= Ejiri Station (disambiguation) =

Ejiri Station is a tram station in Toyama Prefecture, Japan.

Ejiri Station could also refer to:

- Ejiri-juku, the 18th station of the Tōkaidō
- Shimizu Station (Shizuoka), a train station in Shizuoka Prefecture, Japan, named Ejiri Station from 1889 to 1934
