= Kaetsunou Bus =

Bus company in Toyama prefecture, Japan

Kaetsunou Bus Co., Ltd.
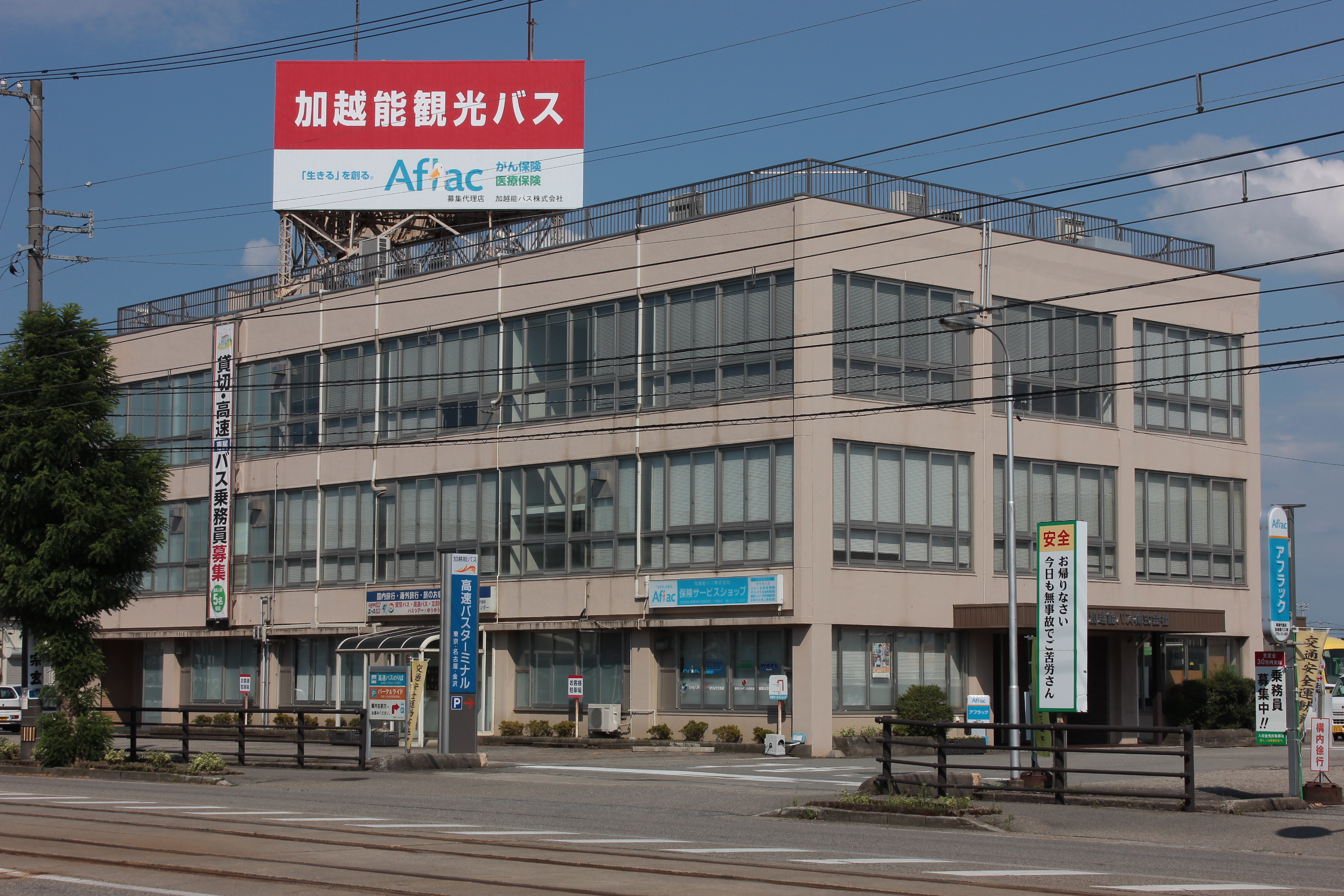
- Headquarters building
- Parent: Toyama Chihō Railway
- Founded: 23 October 1950
- Headquarters: 1243-1 Muranaka, Ejiri Aza, Takaoka, Toyama, Japan
- Service area: Toyama
- Service type: Bus
- Chief executive: Yuji Inada
- Website: Kaetsuno Bus(in Japanese)

Kaetsunō Railway (加越能鉄道株式会社, Kaetsunō Tetsudō Kabushiki Kaisha) is a bus company operating in the central and western parts of Toyama Prefecture, Japan. Contrary to its name, the company no longer operates railway lines. Its last Manyō Line was handed over to Manyōsen in 2002.

== Outline ==
As it discontinued all railway lines in 2002 due to serious deficit, the company changed its corporation name from Kaetsunō Railway (加越能鉄道) to Kaetsunō Bus (加越能バス).

== Business in the past ==
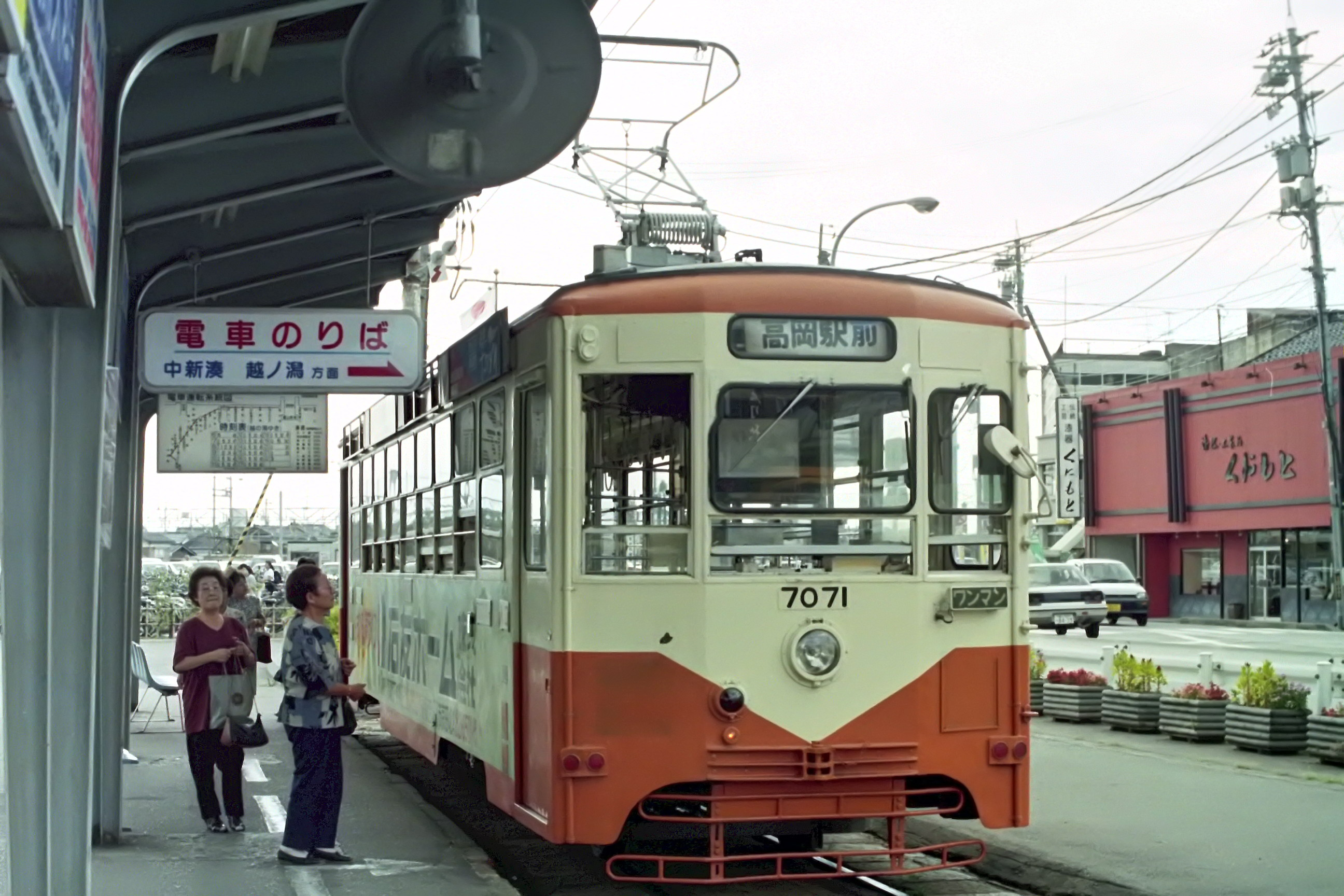
Takaoka Station

=== Railway ===
==== Routes ====
- Man'yōsen Shinminatokō Line (Transferred to Manyosen in 2002)
- Man'yōsen Takaoka Kidō Line (Transferred to Manyosen in 2002)
- Kaetsu Line (discontinued in 1972)
- Fushiki Line (discontinued in 1971)

=== Manyō Line ===
The Takaoka Kidō Line and the Shiminatoko Line were operated by Kaetsuno Railway and was called the Manyō Line. As the number of passengers decreased, the railway company discontinued these lines and replaced them by route buses. In 2001, due to local opposition, Kaetsuno Railway, Toyama Chiho Railway, Toyama Prefecture, and Takaoka City established the third sector company named Manyosen Company which now operates Manyō Line, after it was transferred to Manyosen from Kaetsuno Railway in 2002.

== Bus routes ==
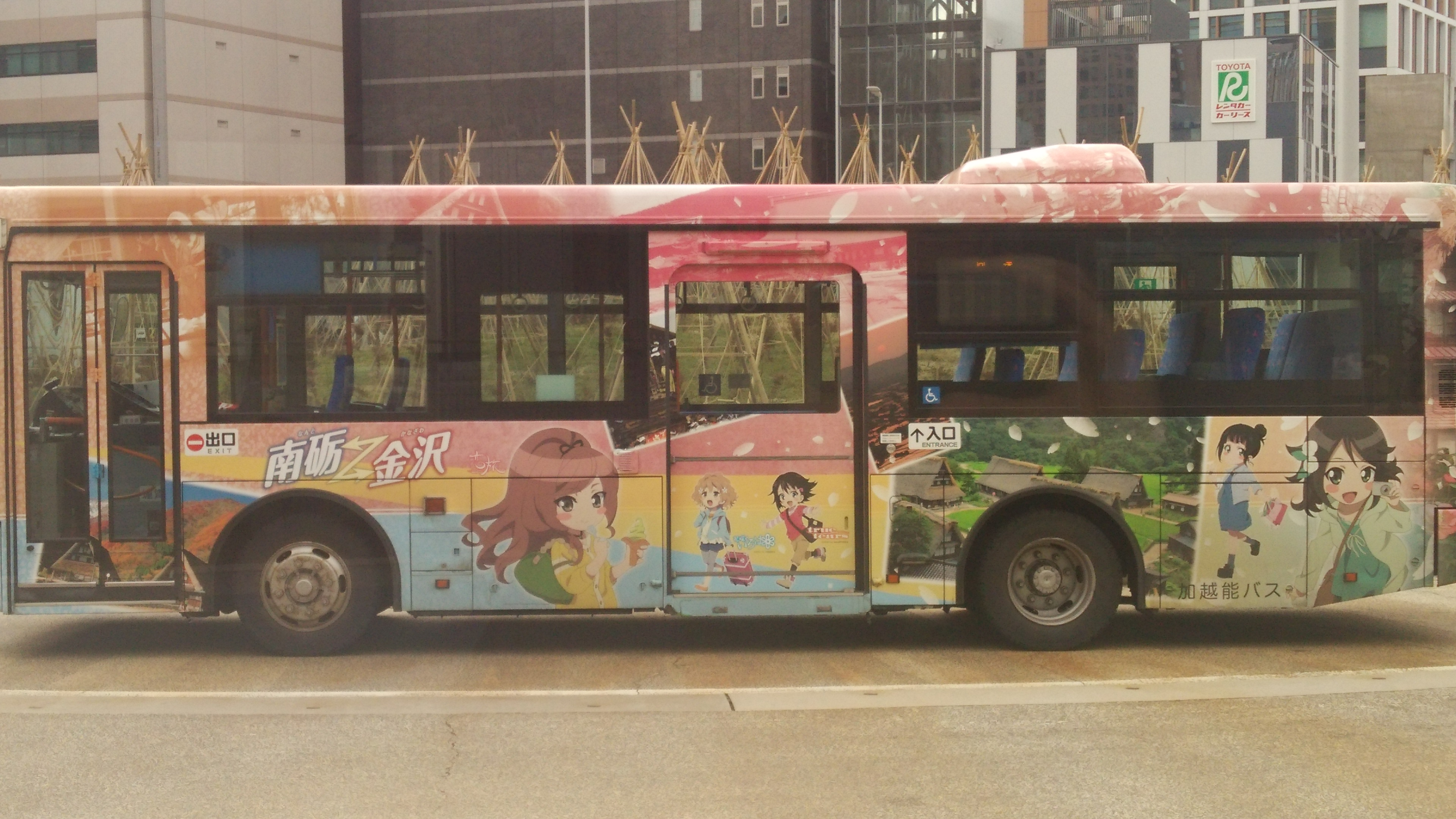
collaborated with Hanasaku Iroha and True Tears

Kaetsuno Bus Company runs buses bound for Gokayama and Shirakawa-gō that are World Heritage Sites.
