= Shikino Chūgakkō-mae Station =

City tram station in Toyama Prefecture, Japan

Coordinates: 36°45′20″N 137°01′25″E

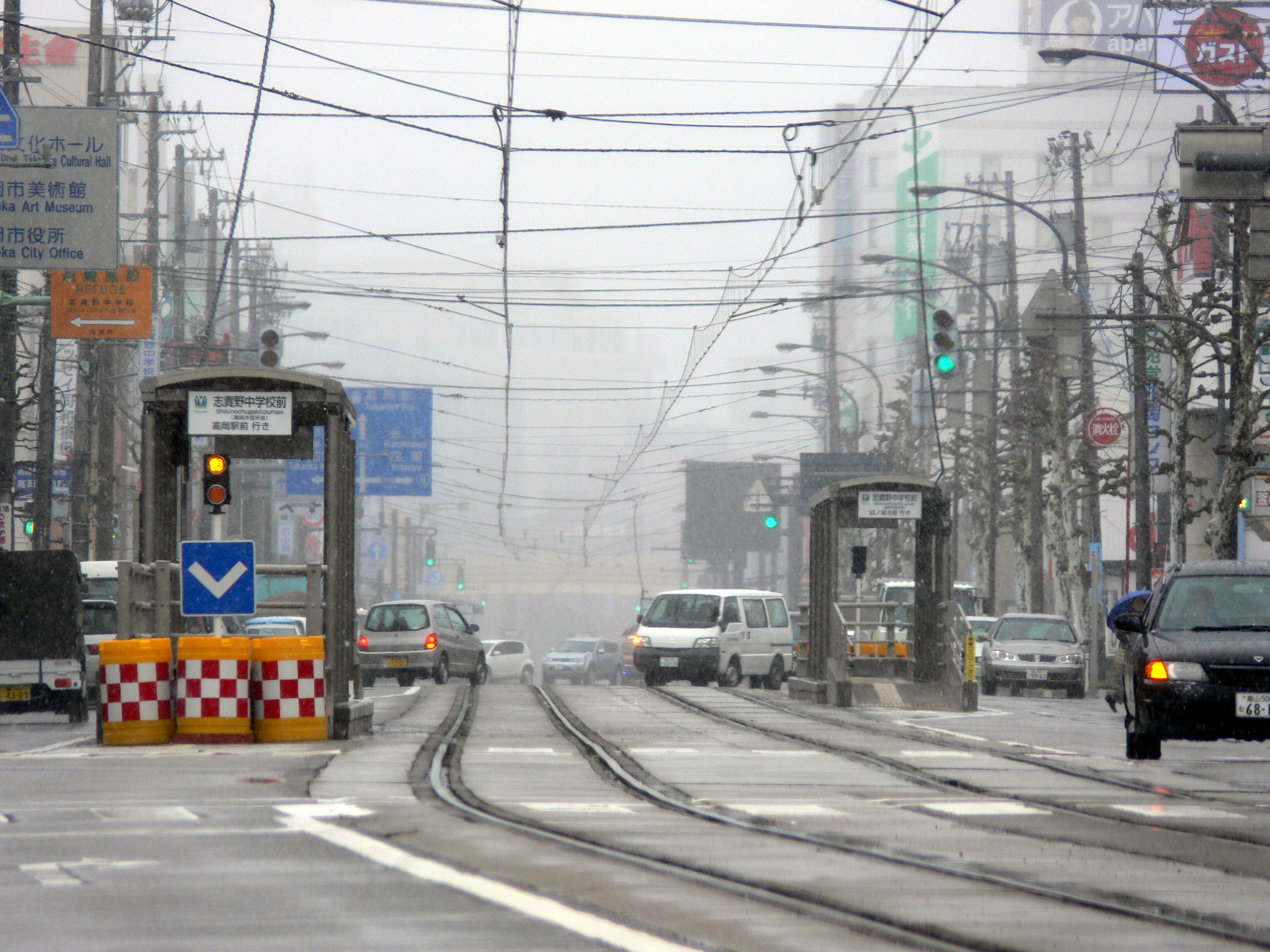
Shikino Chūgakkō-mae Station

The Shikino Chūgakkō-mae Station (志貴野中学前駅, Shikino Chūgakkō-mae Eki) is a city tram station on the Takaoka Kidō Line located in Takaoka, Toyama Prefecture, Japan. The station is sometimes called Takaoka-shi Yakusho-mae (高岡市役所前) because it's closer to the city offices than Honmaru Kaikan-mae Station.

== Surrounding area ==
- Takaoka City Offices

←	Service	→
Hirokōji	Takaoka Kidō Line	Shiminbyōin-mae
