= Suehirochō Station =

Suehirochō Station (末広町駅(すえひろちょうえき)) is the name of four train stations in Japan.

- Suehirochō Station (Kanagawa)
- Suehirochō Station (Tokyo)
- Suehirochō Station (Hokkaido) (tram)
- Suehirochō Station (Toyama) (tram)
