= Nakafushiki Station =

Tram station in Imizu, Toyama prefecture, Japan

Coordinates: 36°47′18″N 137°03′42″E

Nakafushiki Station 中伏木駅
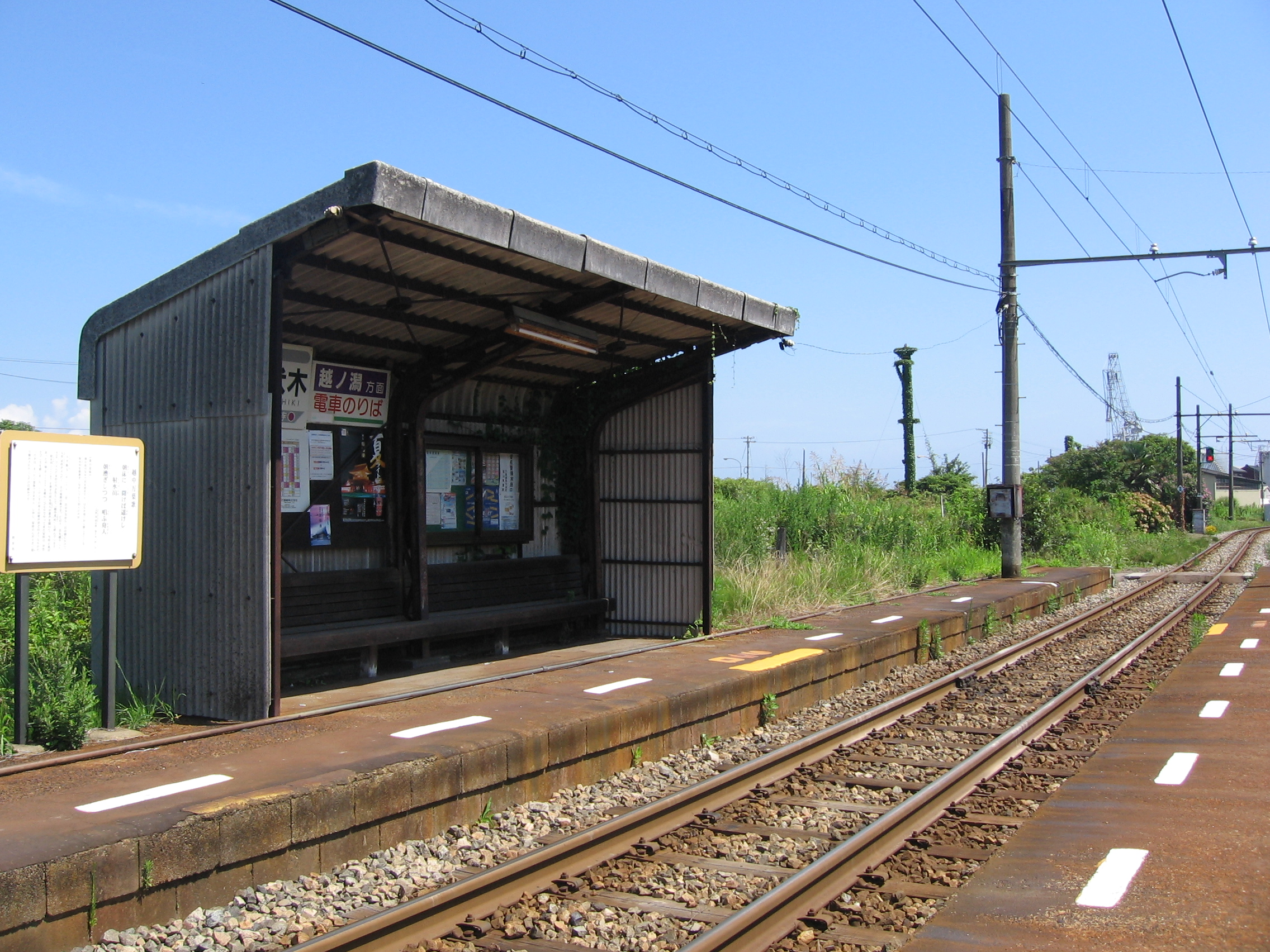

General information
- Location: Takaoka, Toyama Prefecture; Japan
- Operator: Man'yōsen
- Line: Takaoka Kidō Line
Location

The Naka Fushiki Station (中伏木駅, Naka Fushiki Eki) is a city tram station on the Takaoka Kidō Line located in Takaoka, Toyama Prefecture, Japan.

== Surrounding area ==
Near the JR West Himi Line Fushiki Station and the ferry port.

←	Service	→
Yoshihisa	Takaoka Kidō Line	Rokudōji
