= Ejiri =

Ejiri (江尻) is a Japanese surname. Notable people with the surname include:

- Atsuhiko Ejiri (江尻 篤彦) (born 1967), Japanese footballer
- Tatsuma Ejiri (江尻 立真) (born 1975), Japanese manga artist

== See also ==
- Ejiri-juku (江尻宿, Ejiri-juku), Tōkaidō station in Shizuoka, Shizuoka Prefecture, Japan
- Ejiri Station (江尻駅, Ejiri-eki), city tram station in Takaoka, Toyama Prefecture, Japan
