= Kataharamachi Station (Toyama) =

City tram station in Toyama Prefecture, Japan

Coordinates: 36°44′47.34″N 137°0′46.72″E

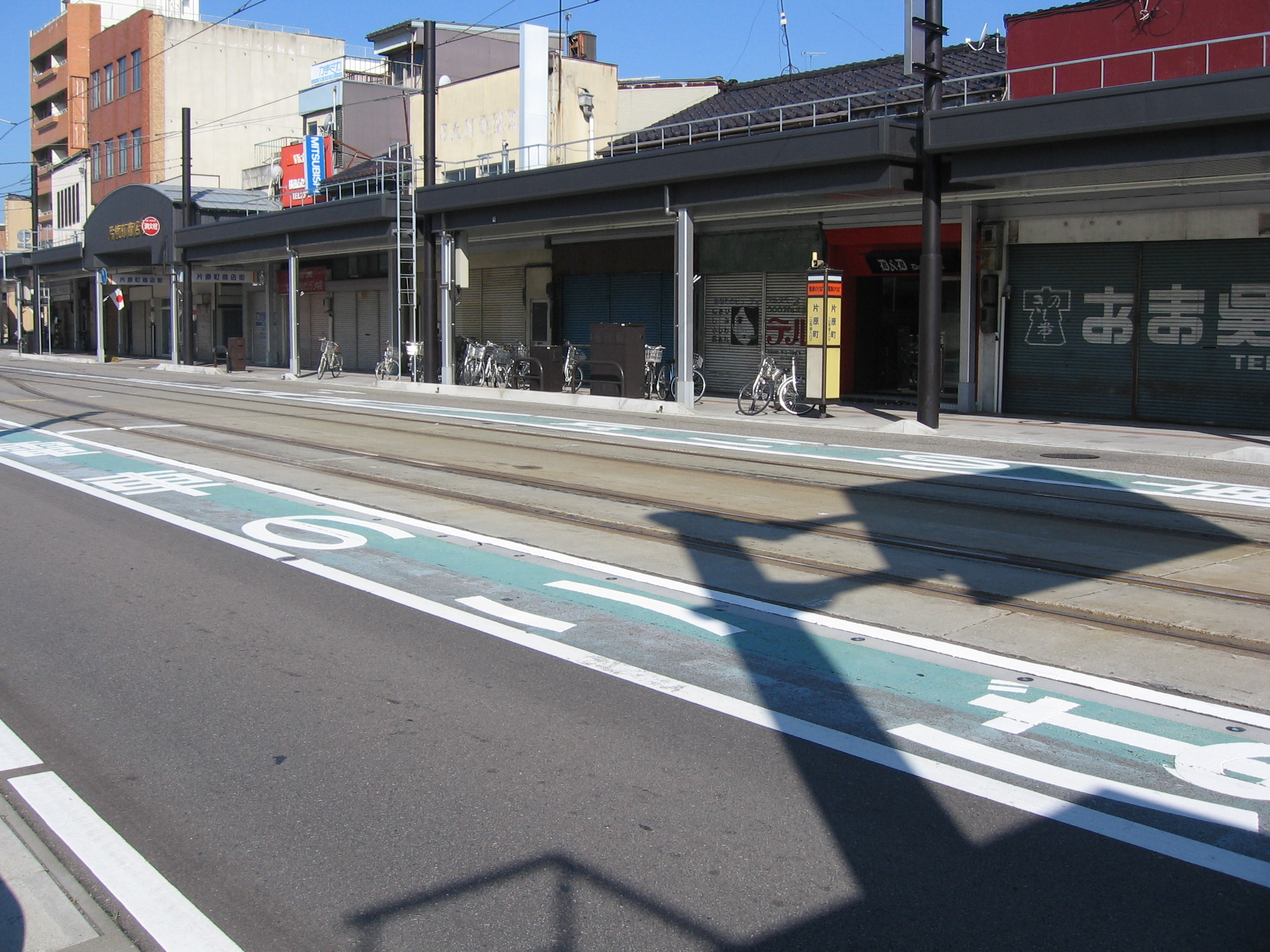
Katahara-machi Station

The Katahara-machi Station (片原町駅, Katahara-machi Eki) is a city tram station on the Takaoka Kidō Line located in Takaoka, Toyama Prefecture, Japan. The station is sometimes called Yamachōsuji Entrance (山町筋入り口, Yamachōsuji Iriguchi).

== Structure ==
Kataharamachi Station has two tracks with side platforms on street level.

== Adjacent stations ==
←	Service	→
Suehirochō	Takaoka Kidō Line	Sakashita-machi
