= Nōmachiguchi Station =

Tram station in Takaoka, Toyama prefecture, Japan

Coordinates: 36°46′24″N 137°02′56″E

Nōmachiguchi Station 能町口駅
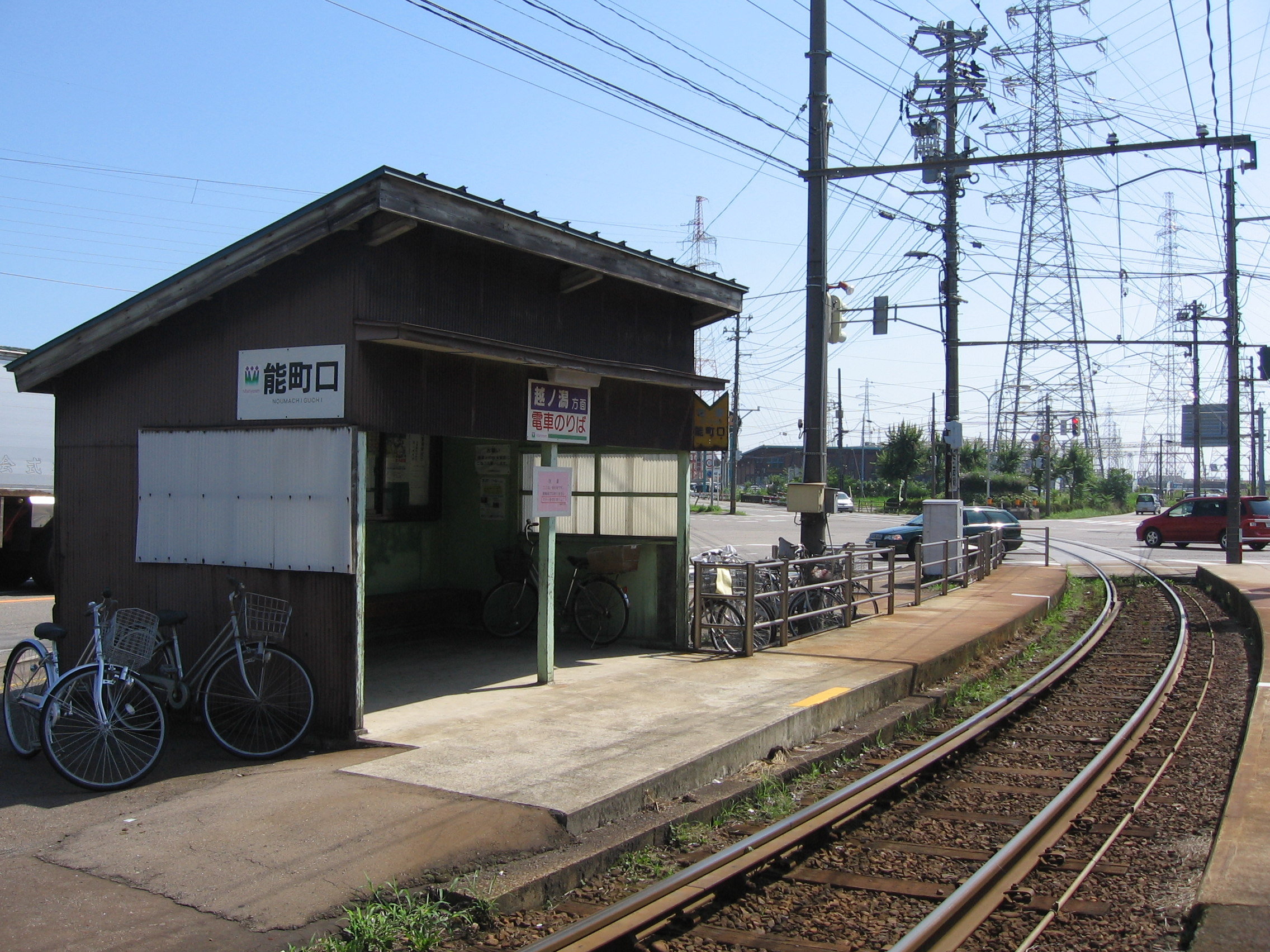

General information
- Location: Takaoka, Toyama Prefecture; Japan
- Operated by: Man'yōsen
- Line: Takaoka Kidō Line
Location

The Nōmachiguchi Station (能町口駅, Nōmachiguchi Eki) is a city tram station on the Takaoka Kidō Line located in Takaoka, Toyama Prefecture, Japan.

←	Service	→
Yonejimaguchi	Takaoka Kidō Line	Shin Yoshihisa
