= Shin-Nōmachi Station =

Tram station in Takaoka, Toyama, Japan

Coordinates: 36°46′12.66″N 137°2′15.60″E

Shin-Nōmachi Station 米島口駅
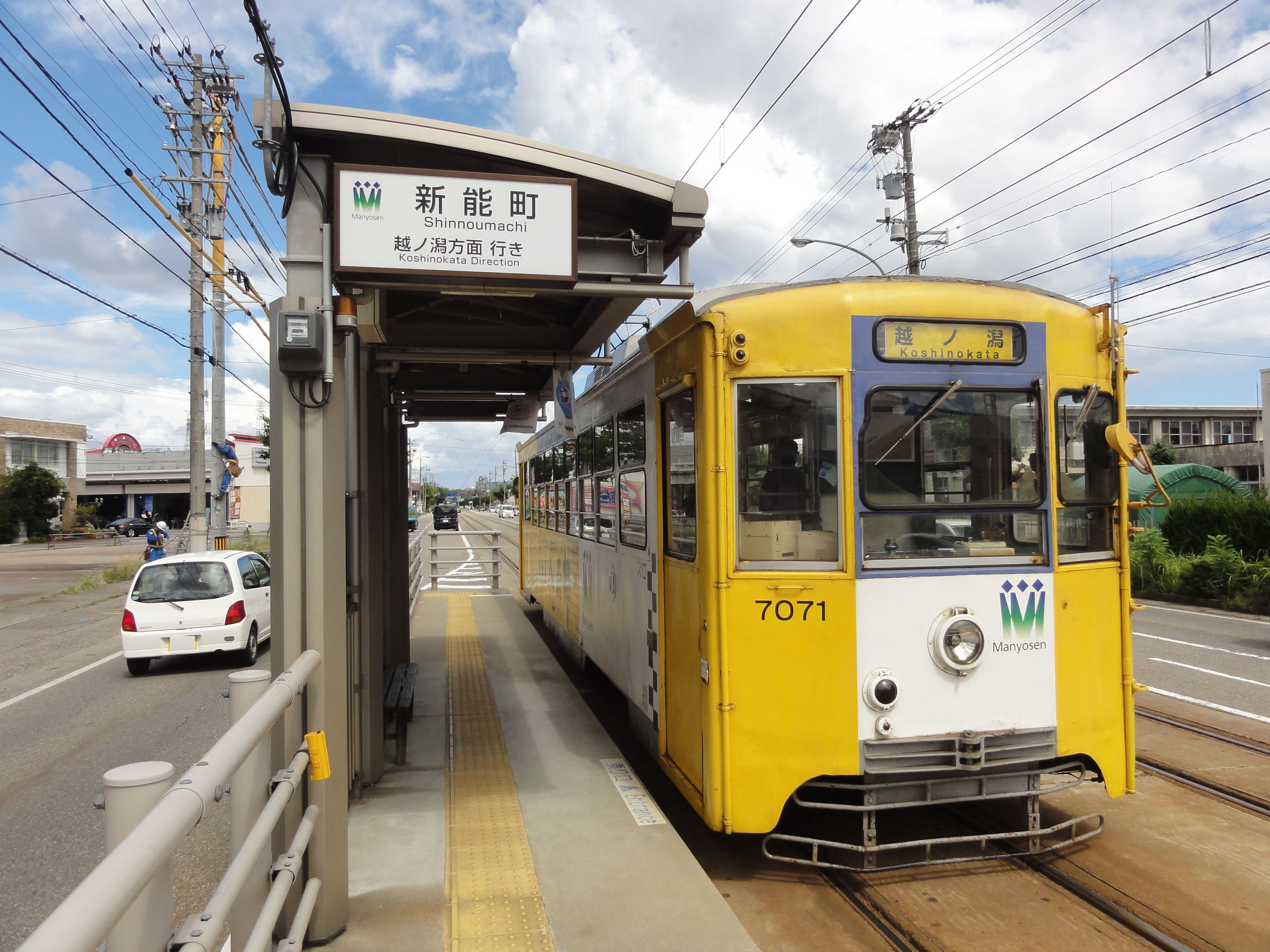

General information
- Location: Takaoka, Toyama Prefecture; Japan
- Operated by: Man'yōsen
- Line: Takaoka Kidō Line
Location

Shin Nōmachi Station (新能町駅, Shin Nōmachi Eki) is a city tram station on the Takaoka Kidō Line located in Takaoka, Toyama Prefecture, Japan.

== Surrounding area ==
- JR West Himi Line Nōmachi Station

| ← | Service | → |
|---|---|---|
| Ogino | Takaoka Kidō Line | Yonejimaguchi |
