= Asahigaoka Station (Toyama) =

Tram station in Takaoka, Toyama prefecture, Japan

Asahigaoka 旭ヶ丘駅
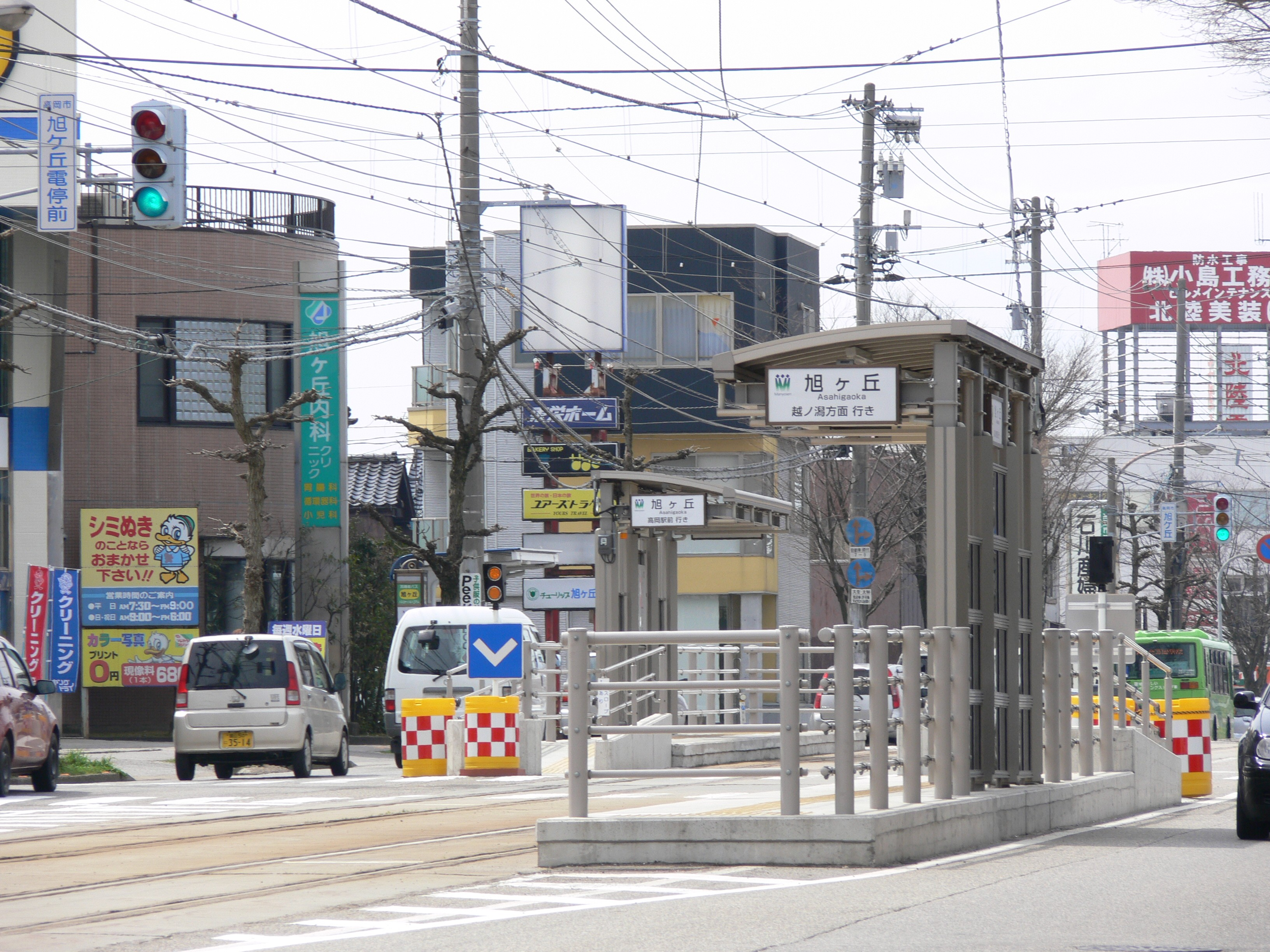

General information
- Location: Takaoka, Toyama Prefecture; Japan
- Coordinates: 36°45′50″N 137°1′57″E
- System: tram stop
- Line: Takaoka Kidō Line

Services
Preceding station	Manyōsen	Following station
Ejiri	Takaoka Kidō Line	Ogino
Location

Asahigaoka Station (旭ヶ丘駅, Asahigaoka Eki) is a city tram station on the Takaoka Kidō Line located in Takaoka, Toyama Prefecture, Japan.
