= Takaoka Station (Manyosen) =

City train station located in Takaoka, Toyama, Japan

Coordinates: 36°44′31.8″N 137°0′53.4″E

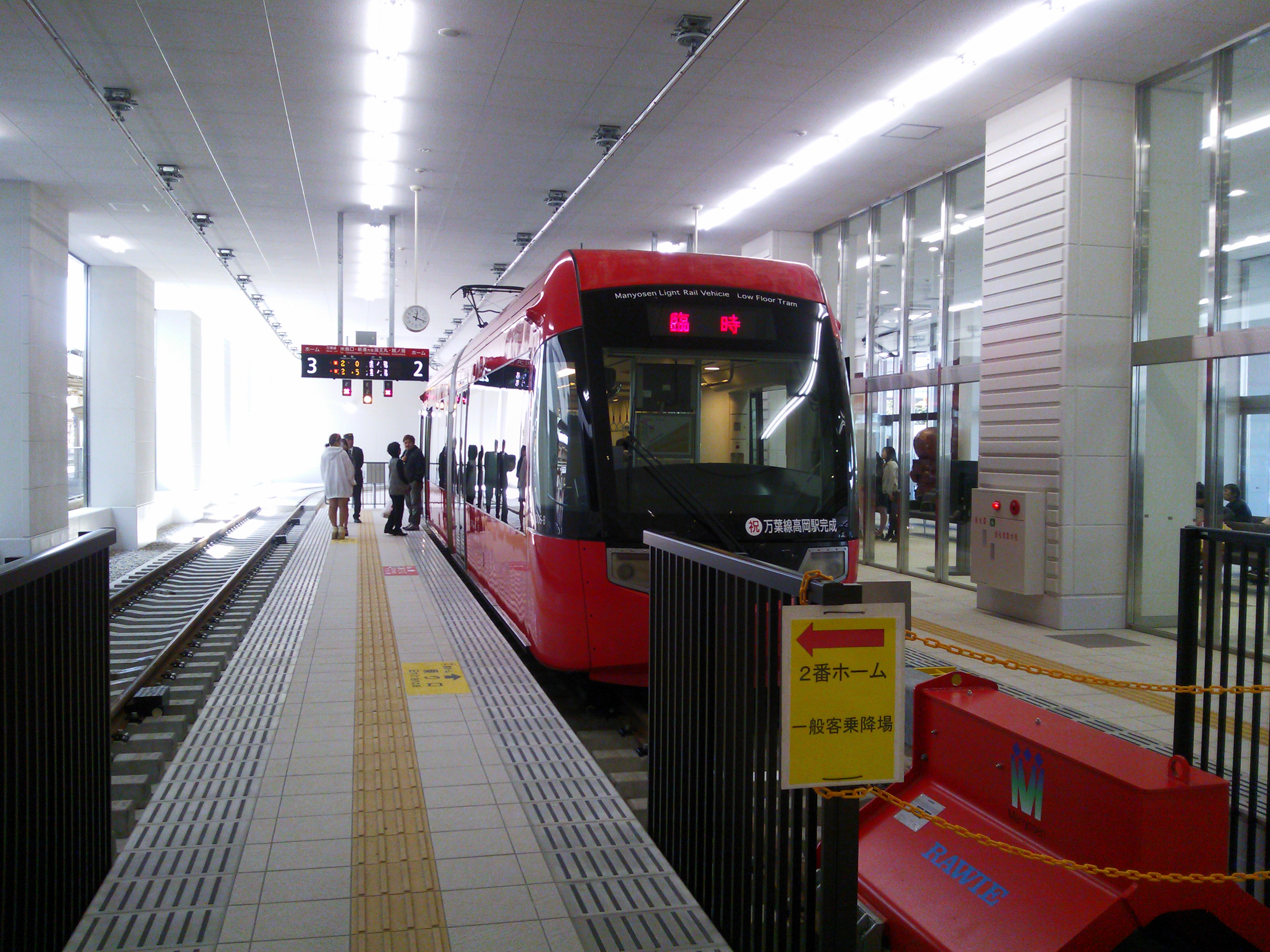
Tram at platform, April 2014

The Takaoka Station (高岡駅, Takaoka-eki) is a city tram station on the Manyosen Takaoka Kidō Line located in Takaoka, Toyama Prefecture, Japan. This tram stop was created in order to service the shopping area between Katahara-machi and Otaya Avenue, and to service the JR West & Ainokaze Toyama Railway Takaoka Station.

It was called Takaoka-Eki-mae Station (高岡駅前駅, Takaoka-eki-mae-eki) before the platform was relocated from the street outside the station to the first (i.e. ground) floor of the "curun Takaoka" Building (due to differing translations it is also known as "Krun Takaoka" or "Krung Takaoka") which is attached to Takaoka Station, on March 29, 2014.

== Name ==
Unlike other station names of the Manyōsen, the word "Station," which refers to the JR West & Ainokaze Toyama Railway station, is a part of the name of the tram stop.

== Structure ==
There are two tracks served by three platforms. The track closest to the waiting room has a platform on both sides (Platforms 1 & 2), while the other track only has a platform on one side (Platform 3).

== History ==
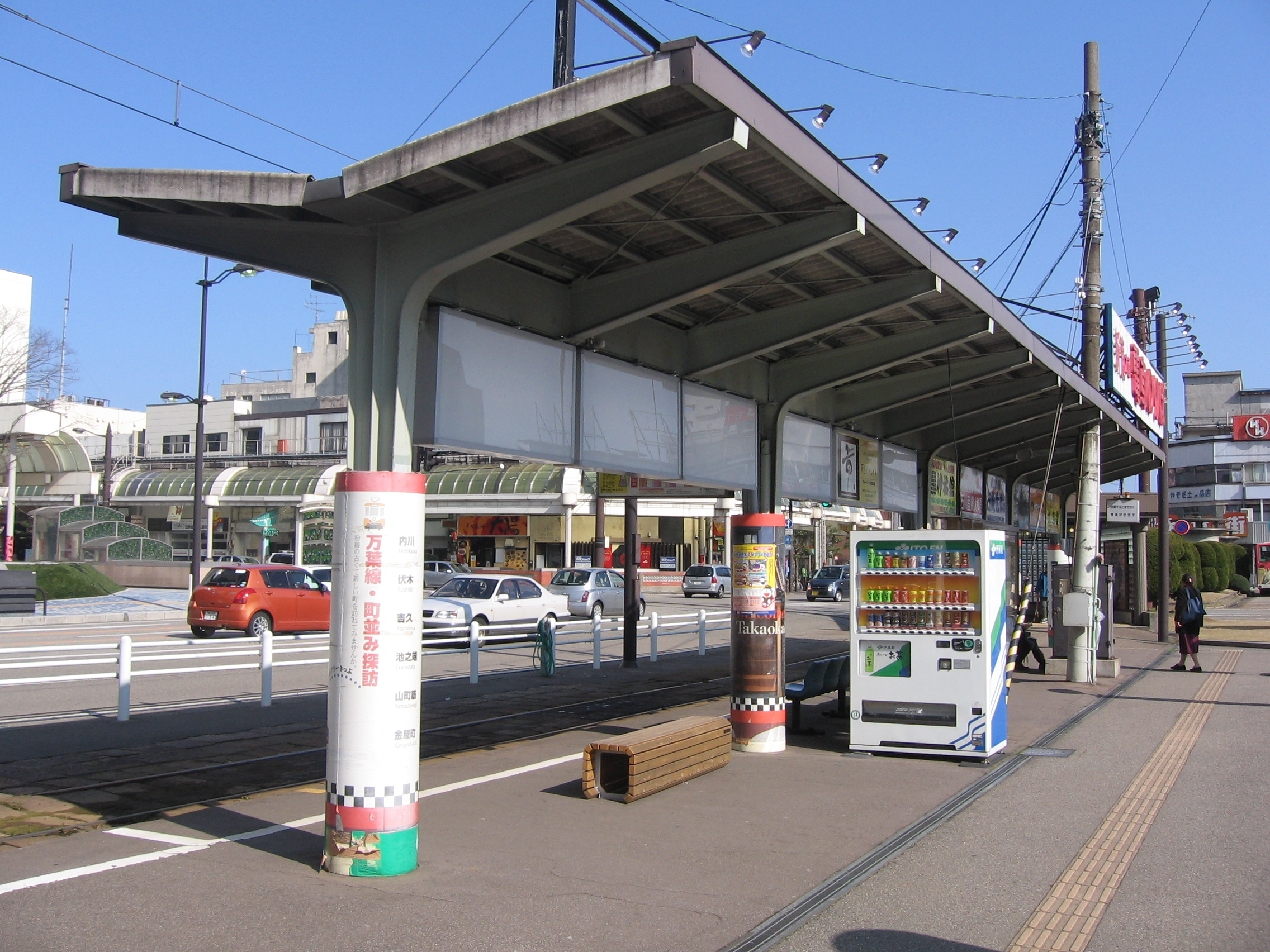
Takaoka-Eki-mae Station, February 2009

- April 10, 1948: Toyama Chihō Railway opens Chitetsu-Takaoka Station
- April 1, 1959: Station renamed Shin-Takaoka Station when the line is transferred to Kaetsunō Railway
- 1979: Station renamed Takaoka-Eki-mae Station
- April 1, 2002: Station becomes a part of Manyosen
- March 29, 2014: Station moves from the street to the current building.

== Surrounding area ==
JR West Takaoka Station, terminus for the Jōhana and Himi Lines, is located right in front of this station.

== Adjacent stations ==
←	Service	→
Terminus	Takaoka Kidō Line	Suehirochō
