= Sosen Mishima =

Japanese author

Sosen Mishima (三島 霜川, Mishima Sōsen, July 30, 1876–March 7, 1934) was a Japanese writer from Takaoka, Toyama, Japan.
