= Zuiryū-ji (Toyama) =

Buddhist temple in Takaoka, Toyama, Japan

- 瑞龍寺
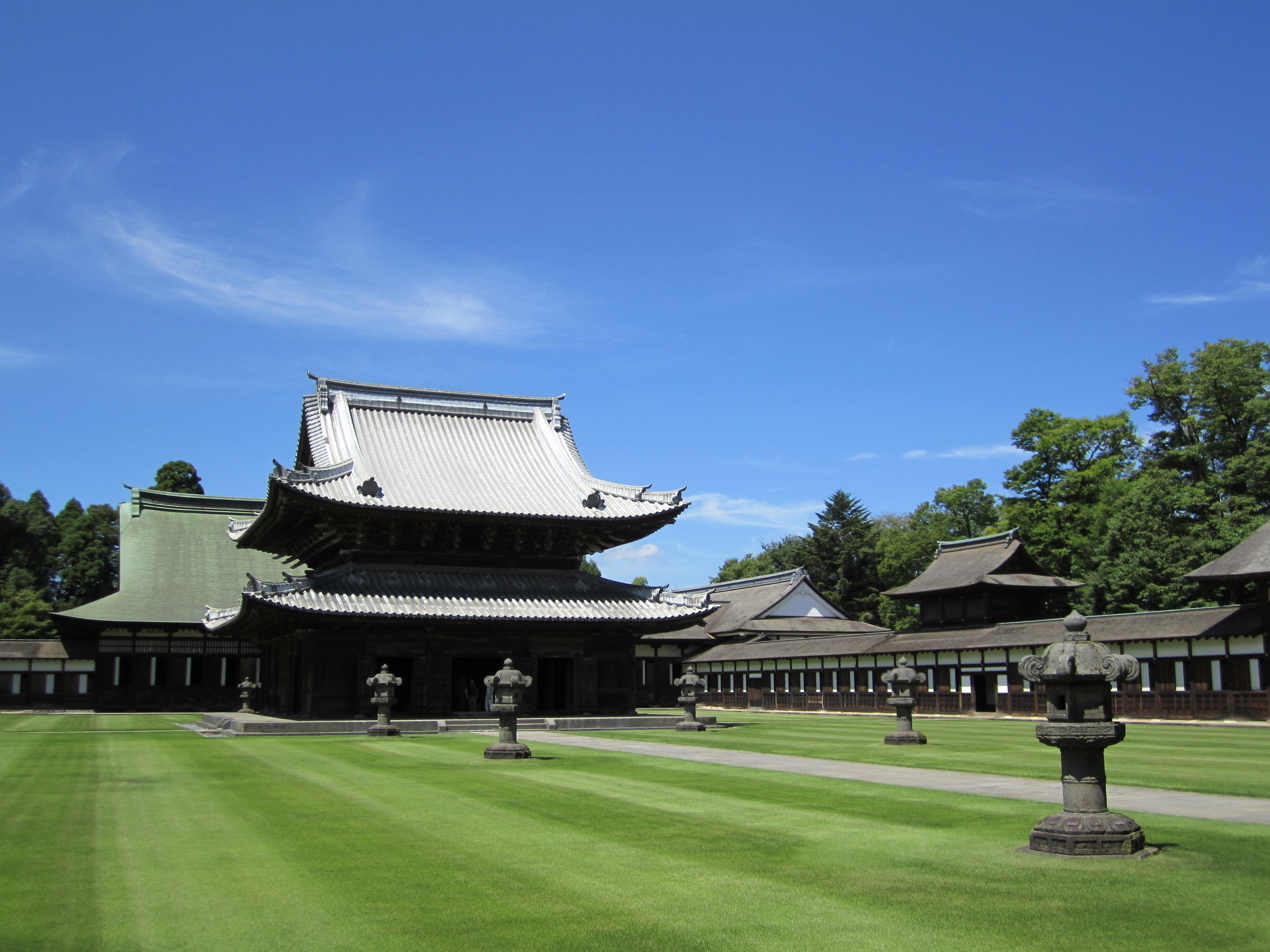
- Zuiryū-ji, Butsuden main hall

- Location within Toyama Prefecture Location within Japan

Religion
- Affiliation: Buddhist
- Deity: Shaka Nyorai
- Rite: Sōtō
- Status: functional

Location
- Location: Takaoka, Toyama
- Country: Japan
- Interactive map of Zuiryū-ji
- Coordinates: 36.735595°N 137.010504°E

Architecture
- Founder: Maeda Toshinaga
- Completed: 1613

Website
- Official website

Zuiryū-ji (瑞龍寺) is a Buddhist temple in Takaoka, Toyama Prefecture, Japan. The temple belongs to the Sōtō-school of Japanese Zen Buddhism.

== History ==
The second daimyō of Kaga Domain, Maeda Toshinaga (1562–1614) after retiring to Takaoka, had a temple, Hōen-ji (法円寺) built, which was completed in 1613. After Toshinaga's death in 1614, the temple was renamed to Zuiryū-ji after his posthumous name, Zuiryū-in (瑞龍院). His younger brother, Maeda Toshitsune, and third daimyō of Kaga, in commemoration of Toshinaga, had the temple expanded starting in 1645. The extensions were supervised by Yamagami Zen’emon Yoshihiro (山上善右衛門嘉広) who completed the works for the 50th anniversary in 1663. The temple complex at the time covered an area of 118,800 m^{2} (1,279,000 sq ft) and — similar to a castle — was surrounded by two moats.

== Temple complex ==
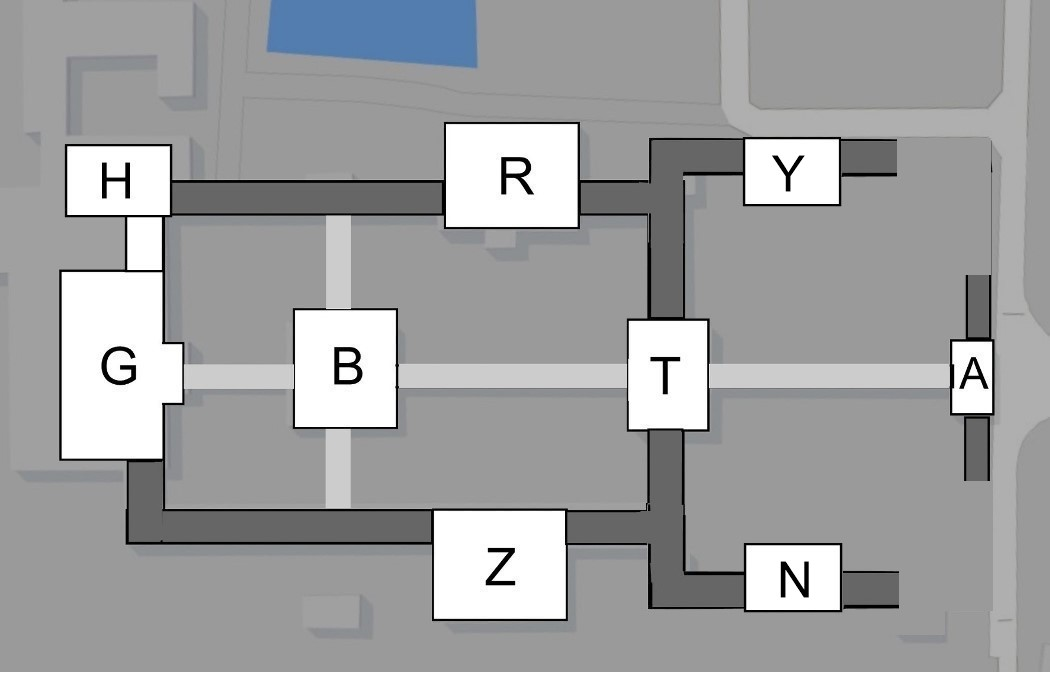
Temple layout

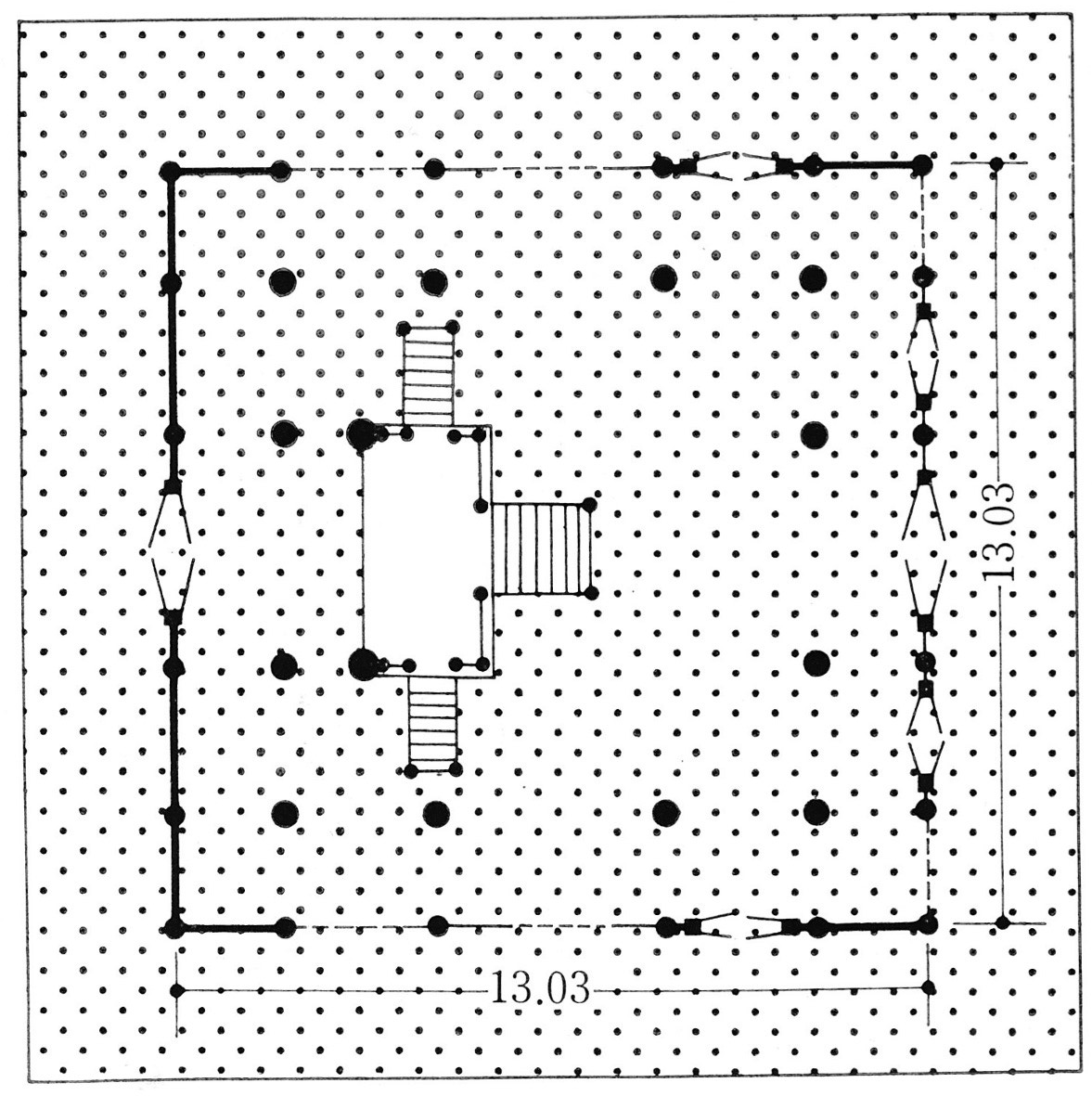
Buddha Hall

The temple compound or garan in the zen style is modeled after the Zen temple Jingshanshou (径山寿寺) in Hangzhou.

- The main entrance gate (総門, sōmon) (A) outside of the actual complex has a kirizuma style, (Note: (kirizuma-zukuri, 切妻造): a gabled roof with equal lengths from the ridge to the eaves) gabled roof with thin shingles (杮葺き, kokera-buki). It is a 3 ken wide yakuimon. (Note: (yakuimon, 薬医門): gate with gabled roof resting on two square or rectangular main posts and two square or circular secondary posts) Decorated with the emblem (mon) of the Maeda clan, plum blossom and lions on either end, it is a good example of Momoyama and early Edo period ornamentation.
- Built in 1645, the High gate (山門, sanmon) (T) was lost in fire in 1746. It was rebuilt from 1814 to 1818 by Yamagami Zen’emon Yoshihiro. The gate is a two-storied 3 ken wide main gate to the temple and has an irimoya style roof (Note: (irimoya-zukuri, 入母屋造): a hip-and-gable roof combining a ridge and two gable pediments on the upper part with a hipped roof on all sides in the lower part of the roof) with thin shingles (杮葺き, kokera-buki). On either side it is connected to a 3 ken wide, 1 ken deep single-storied corridor (kairō) with 'kirizuma-style roof, which connects most of the structures in the complex.
- The main hall or Buddha-Hall (仏殿, butsuden) (B) is located in the centre of the temple compound. Made of elm wood, it measures 3×3 ken or 13 by 13 m (43 by 43 ft). The roof is in irimoya-style with a pent roof enclosure, (Note: (mokoshi, 裳階): a pent roof enclosure, generally one ken deep) lead plate roofing. Inside it is a mixture of Japanese and Indian style with good carvings; a masterpiece of Yamagami.
- The Dharma Hall (法堂, hattō) (G) is the main assembly and lecture hall of the complex and dates to the year 1655. It is single-storied and measures 11×9 ken. The roof is in irimoya-style with a 2×1 step canopy and karahafu gable. (Note: (karahafu, 唐破風): an undulating bargeboard flowing downwards from the top center with convex curves on each side that change to concave curves which either level off or turn upward at the ends) It is roofed with copper plates. The ceiling of the central room has been decorated in floral motif by Kanō Yasunobu. At the end of the room in the central alcove there is a stele commemorating Maeda Toshinaga. The alcove to the right has been used for receptions by the Maeda, the one to the left was reserved for the priests and higher ranking cohorts of the Maeda.
- Other buildings in the complex that are connected by the corridor are the large kitchen-residence (大庫裏, daikuri) (R), the meditation hall (禅堂, zen-dō) (Z), the large tea house (大茶堂, dai-chadō) (H).

Close to the entrance on the eastern side of the complex, the following buildings have been renovated recently: the bathhouse (浴室, yokushitsu) (Y) and the toilet (七間浄頭, shichiken chinjū) (N). (Note: At a zen temple, the toilet is variously paraphrased as (浄頭; lit. peace of mind) or tōchin (東浄; lit. eastern peace) or eastern office (東司).)

In 1997 the High gate, the Buddha-Hall, and the Dharma-Hall were designated as National Treasure. The sōmon, the meditation hall, the large tea house and the corridors have been designated as Important Cultural Property. The temple owns a painting of Daruma by Sesshū, a Kannon by Kanō Tan'yū and other paintings.

== See also ==
- List of National Treasures of Japan (temples)
