= Sakashitamachi Station =

City tram station in Toyama Prefecture, Japan

Coordinates: 36°44′51″N 137°00′53″E

The Sakashita-machi Station (坂下町駅, Sakashita-machi Eki) is a city tram station on the Takaoka Kidō Line located in Takaoka, Toyama Prefecture, Japan. The station is sometimes called Takaoka Daibutsuguchi (高岡大仏口).

== Surrounding area ==
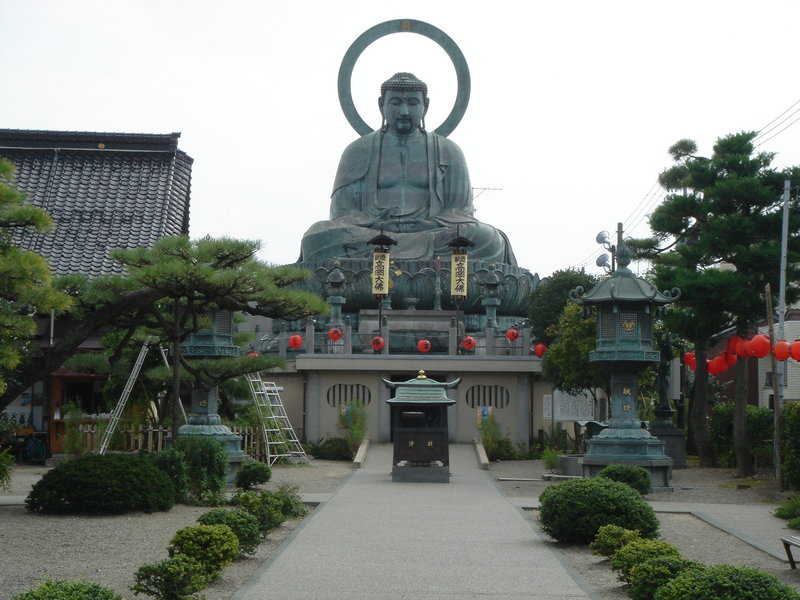
Takaoka City's Great Buddha statue.

- Takaoka Daibutsu (Great Buddha statue)

←	Service	→
Katahara-machi	Takaoka Kidō Line	Kyūkan Iryō Center-mae
