= Rokudōji Station =

Railway station in Imizu, Toyama prefecture, Japan

Coordinates: 36°47′20″N 137°03′57″E

Rokudōji Station 六渡寺駅
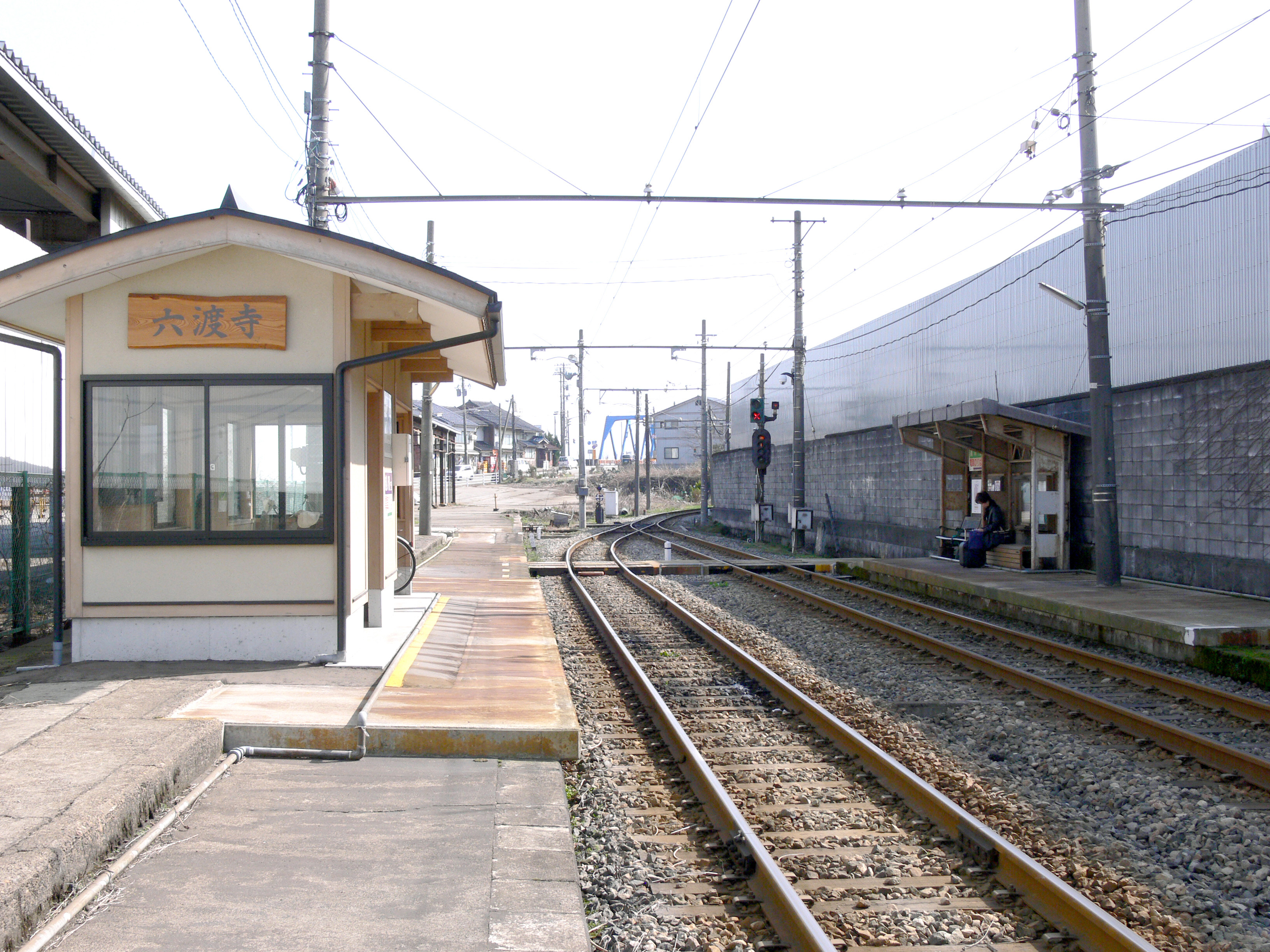

General information
- Location: Imizu, Toyama Prefecture; Japan
- System: Tram Station
- Operator: Manyosen
Location

The Rokudōji Station (六渡寺駅, Rokudōji Eki) is a city tram station located in Imizu, Toyama Prefecture, Japan. The Takaoka Kidō Line and Shin-Minato Harbor Line meet at this station. The station's name was changed from Shin-Minato Station in March 1985.

== Structure ==
Rokudōji Station has two side platforms serving a track each. The station is unstaffed.

== Surrounding area ==
Rokudōji Station is located just off Route 472, and is an important storage location for lumber and other materials. JFE Materials has an office near the station.

== Adjacent stations ==
| ← | Service | → |
|---|---|---|
| Naka Fushiki | Takaoka Kidō Line | Terminus |
| Shōgawaguchi | Shin-Minato Harbor Line | Terminus |
