= Manyosen =

Tram line in Japan

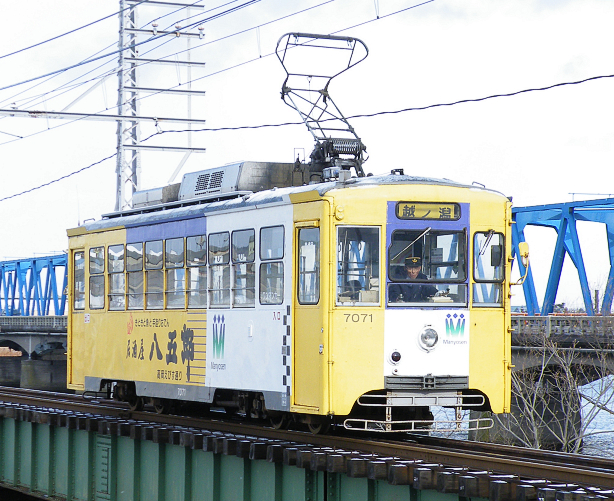

Overview
- Other name(s): Takaoka Kido Line; Shin-Minatoko Line
- Native name: 万葉線
- Status: Operational
- Locale: Toyama Prefecture
- Termini: Koshinokata Station; Takaoka Station
- Stations: 25

Service
- Type: Commuter rail Tram
- Operator(s): Manyosen Co, Ltd.

History
- Opened: 23 December 1930

Technical
- Line length: 12.9 km (8.0 mi)
- Track gauge: 1,067 mm (3 ft 6 in)
- Electrification: 600V DC Overhead catenary

Manyosen (万葉線, Man'yōsen) is a third-sector electric railway (tram) line in Takaoka, Toyama, Japan. The name Manyosen, which literally translates to Manyo Line, is used to refer to both the company and the name of the tram line they operate. Their head office, depot and maintenance facility is located adjacent to the Yonejimaguchi tram stop.

== History ==
The first sections of the line opened on October 12, 1930. The section from Takaoka to Yonejimaguchi opened in 1948. The new line also continued to Fukishi-ko station, but the section beyond Yonejimaguchi was closed in 1971. The former operator Kaetsunō Railway considered closing the line due to heavy deficits and the end of government aid in 1997. In February 1998, Kaetsuno Railway announced their decision to cease all railway services. The two tram and railway lines were transferred to the newly established Manyosen, a third-sector railway on April 1, 2002.

== Services ==
Although Manyosen is a combination of the two lines, a railway and a tram line, the two lines are operated together as one route between Takaoka Station and Koshinokata. As of January 2025, the service operates every 15 minutes (every 30 minutes in the early morning and at night). Travel time is 49 minutes.

=== Station list ===
All stations are located in Toyama Prefecture.

Picture	Station	Japanese	Distance (km)	Location
Takaoka Kidō Line
	Takaoka-eki	高岡駅	0.0	Takaoka
	Suehirocho	末広町	0.5	Takaoka
	Kataharamachi	片原町	0.7	Takaoka
	Sakashitamachi	坂下町	0.9	Takaoka
	Kyukan-iryou center-mae	急患医療センター前	1.3	Takaoka
	Hirokouji	広小路	1.7	Takaoka
	Shikinochugakkoumae	志貴野中学校前	2.1	Takaoka
	Shiminbyouinmae	市民病院前	2.4	Takaoka
	Ejiri	江尻	3.0	Takaoka
	Asahigaoka	旭ヶ丘	3.3	Takaoka
	Ogino	荻布	3.8	Takaoka
	Shinnoumachi	新能町	4.1	Takaoka
	Yonejimaguchi	米島口	4.4	Takaoka
	Nōmachiguchi	能町口	5.5	Takaoka
	Shin-yoshihisa	新吉久	6.0	Takaoka
	Yoshihisa	吉久	6.7	Takaoka
	Naka-fushiki	中伏木	7.5	Imizu
	Rokudōji	六渡寺	8.0	Imizu
Shinminatokō Line
	Shōgawaguchi	庄川口	8.6	Imizu
	Daiichi-Inn-Shinminato Crossbay-mae	第一イン新湊 クロスベイ前駅	9.4	Imizu
	Shimmachiguchi	新町口	10.0	Imizu
	Naka-shimminato	中新湊	10.6	Imizu
	Higashi-shimminato	東新湊	11.6	Imizu
	Kaiōmaru	海王丸	12.2	Imizu
	Koshinokata	越ノ潟	12.9	Imizu
