= Shimin Byōin-mae Station (Toyama) =

City tram station in Toyama Prefecture, Japan

Coordinates: 36°45′29″N 137°01′33″E

The Shimin Byōin-mae Station (市民病院前駅, Shimin Byōin-mae Eki) is a city tram station on the Takaoka Kidō Line located in Takaoka, Toyama Prefecture, Japan.

== Surrounding area ==
- Shimin Byōin (Shimin Hospital or Takaoka Municipal Hospital)
- Hello Work Takaoka

←	Service	→
Shikino Chūgakkō-mae	Takaoka Kidō Line	Ejiri
