= Ogino Station (Toyama) =

Tram station in Takaoka, Toyama, Japan

Coordinates: 36°46′1.09″N 137°2′8.70″E

Ogino Station 荻布駅
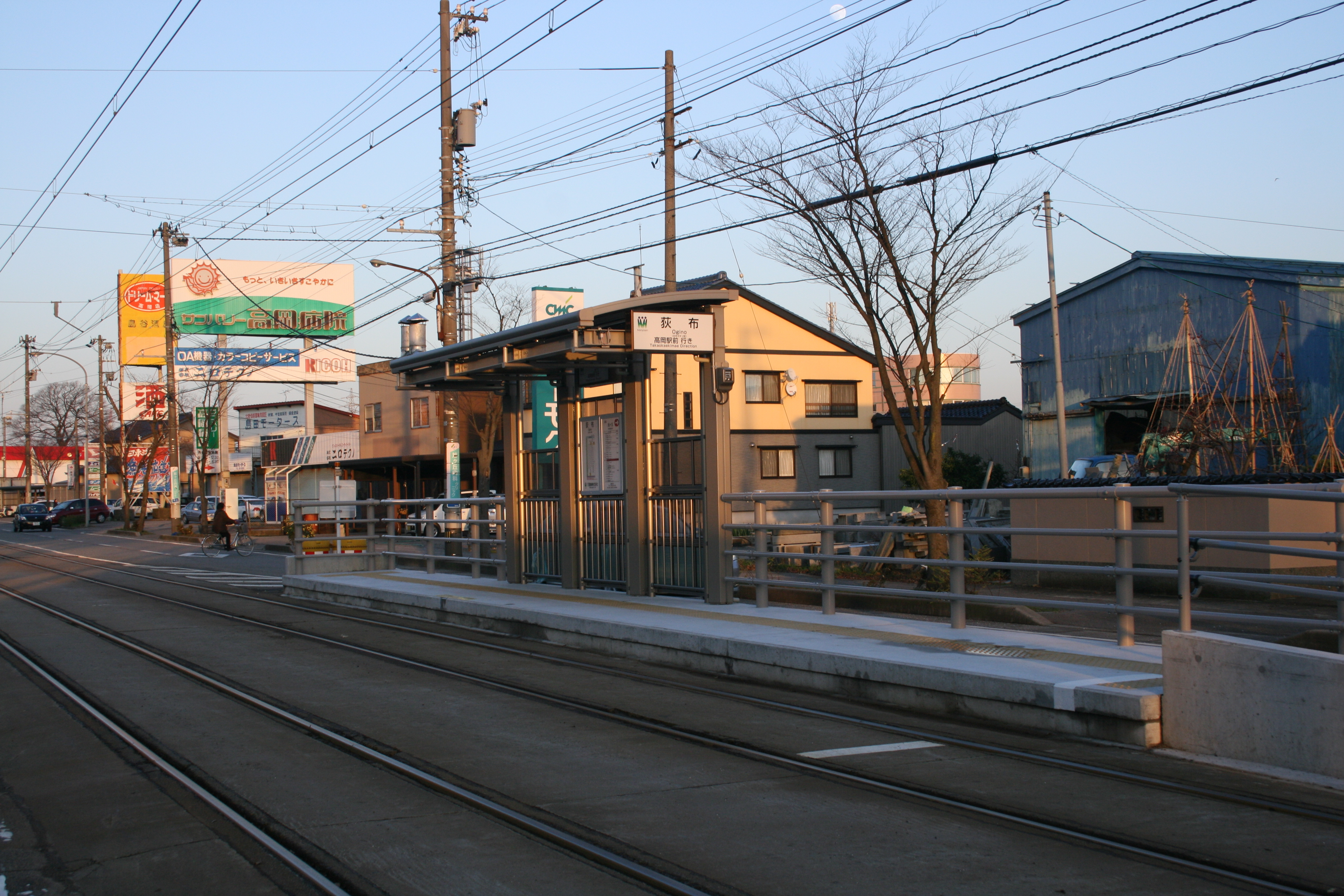

General information
- Location: Takaoka, Toyama Prefecture; Japan
- Operated by: Man'yōsen
- Line: Takaoka Kidō Line
Location

Ogino Station (荻布駅, Ogino Eki) is a city tram station on the Takaoka Kidō Line located in Takaoka, Toyama Prefecture, Japan.

←	Service	→
Asahigaoka	Takaoka Kidō Line	Shin Nōmachi
