= Yonejimaguchi Station =

Tram station in Takaoka, Toyama prefecture, Japan

Coordinates: 36°46′22″N 137°02′19″E

Manyosen yonejimaguchieki.jpg 米島口駅
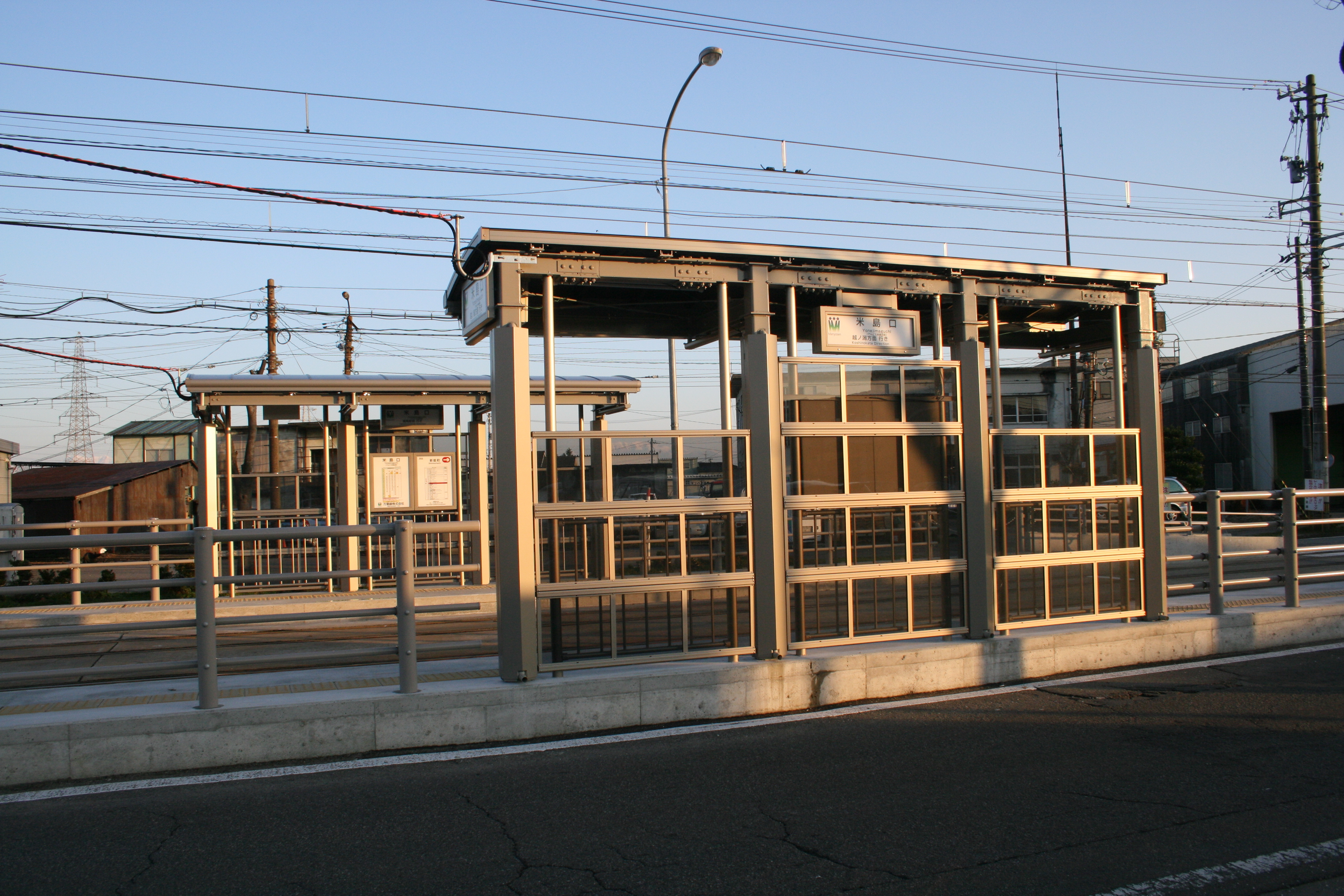

General information
- Location: Takaoka, Toyama Prefecture; Japan
- Operated by: Man'yōsen
- Line: Takaoka Kidō Line
Location

Yonejimaguchi Station (米島口駅, Yonejimaguchi-eki) is a city tram station on the Takaoka Kidō Line in Takaoka, Toyama, Japan.

== Surrounding area ==
- Manyosen Yonejima Depot
- Quattroboom Pachinko

←	Service	→
Shin Nōmachi	Takaoka Kidō Line	Nōmachiguchi
