= Hirokōji Station (Toyama) =

City tram station in Toyama Prefecture, Japan

Coordinates: 36°45′9.54″N 137°1′14.62″E

Hirokōji Station 広小路停留場
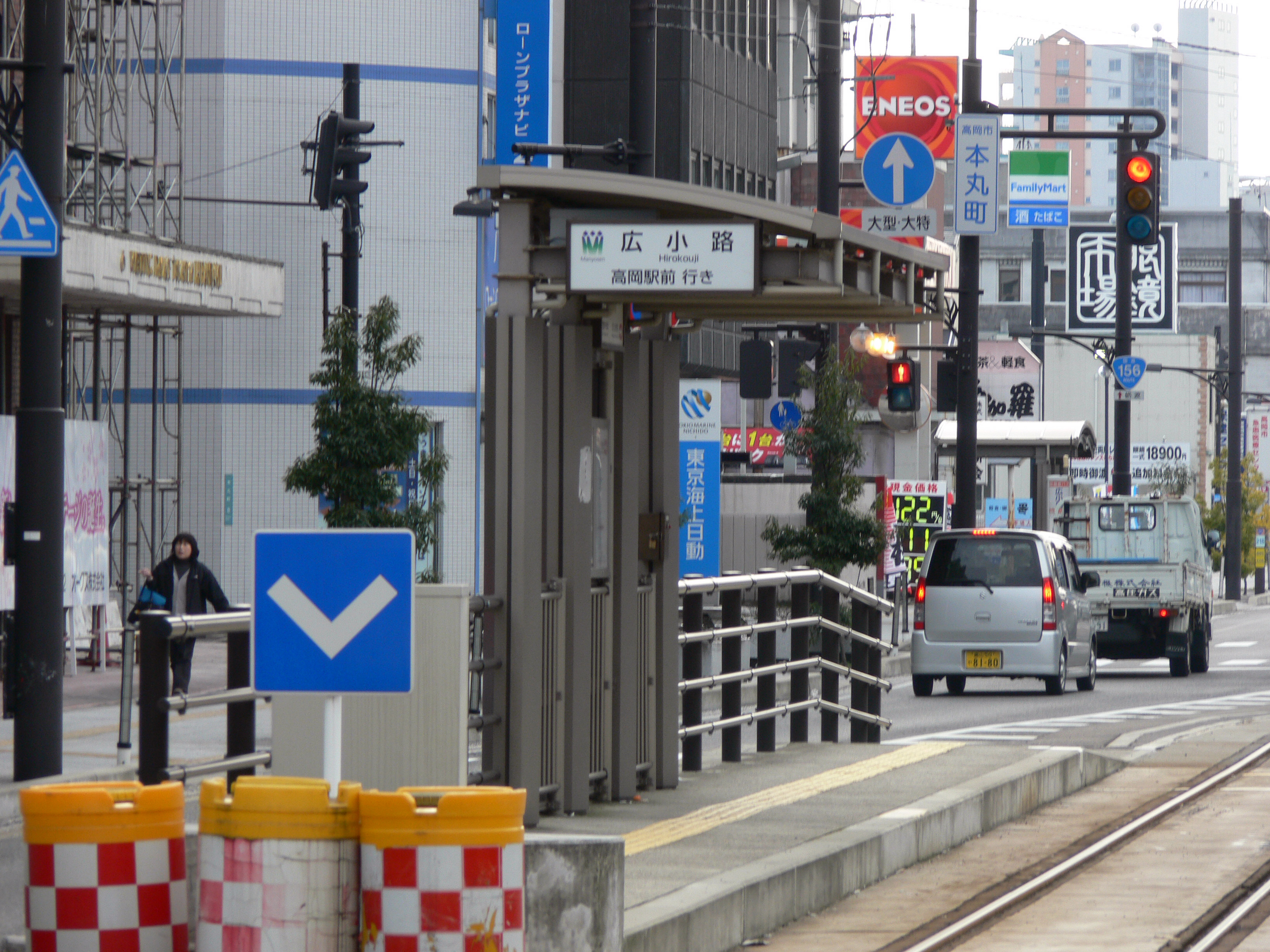
- Platform for Takaoka Station (before the Takaoka Station stop was renamed)

General information
- Location: 1 Marunouchi, Takaoka, Toyama 933-0912, Japan; Takoaka, Toyama Prefecture; Japan
- Line: Man'yōsen Takaoka Kidō Line
- Distance: 1.7km from Takaoka Station
- Platforms: 2
- Tracks: 2
- Train operators: Manyosen

Construction
- Structure type: At-grade

History
- Opened: April 10, 1948; 77 years ago
Location

The Hirokōji Station (広小路駅, Hirokōji Eki) is a city tram station on the Takaoka Kidō Line located in Takaoka, Toyama Prefecture, Japan. The station was renamed from Izumi-chō on May 7, 1958.

== Surrounding area ==
- Takaoka Police Station
- Takaoka City Agricultural Cooperative
- Takaoka Commerce Building

| ← | Service | → |
|---|---|---|
| Kyūkan Iryō Center-mae | Takaoka Kidō Line | Shikino Chūgakkō-mae |
