= Kyūkan Iryō Center-mae Station =

Tram station in Takaoka, Toyama prefecture, Japan

Coordinates: 36°45′2.49″N 137°1′7.43″E

Kyūkan Iryō Center-mae Station (急患医療センター前駅, Kyūkan Iryō Sentā-mae eki)

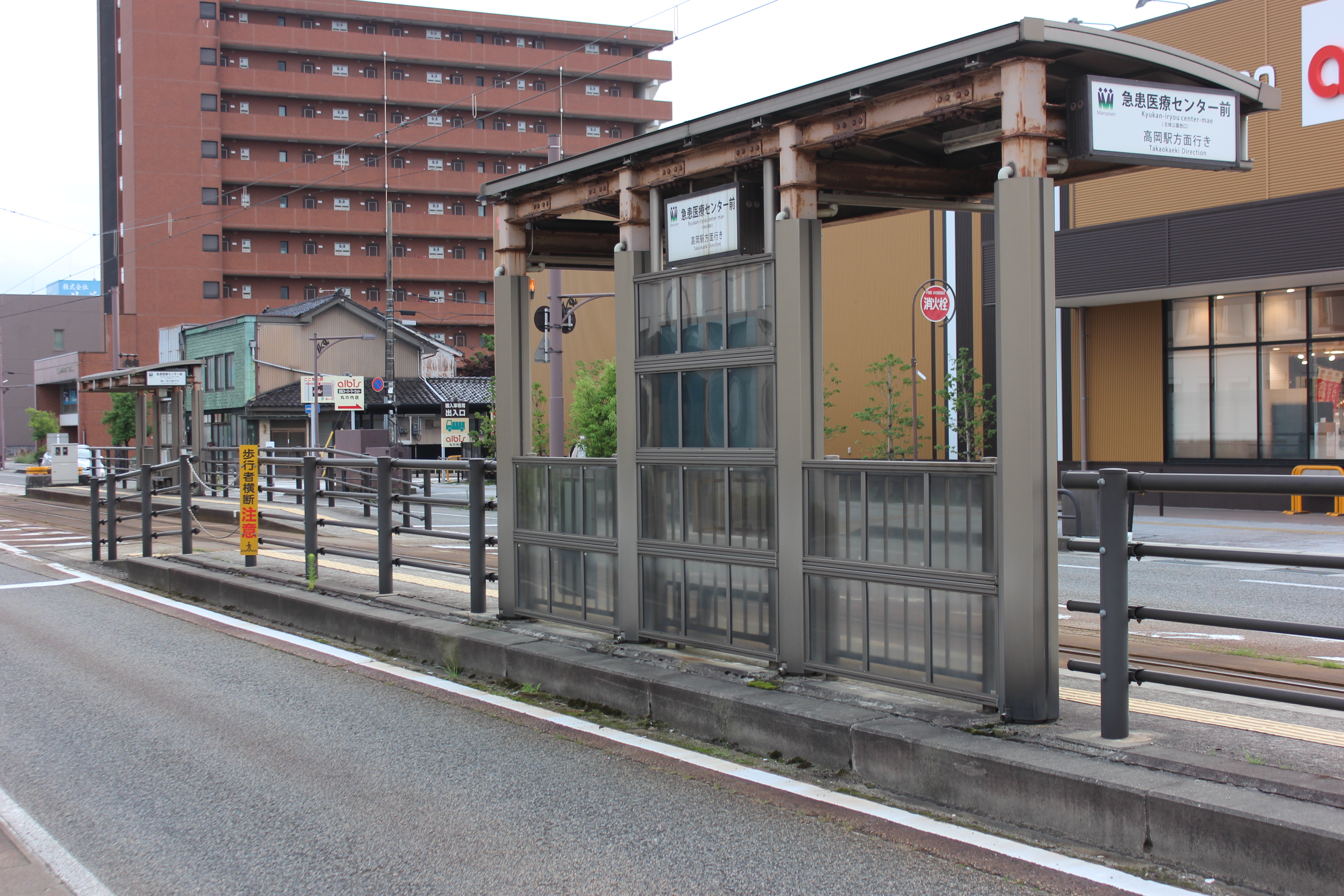
Station in 2020

is a city tram station on the Takaoka Kidō Line located in Takaoka, Toyama Prefecture, Japan. The station was once named Takaoka Shichō-mae and then renamed to Honmaru Kaikan-mae (本丸会館前, Honmaru Kaikan-mae) on October 1, 1977. The present name is from March 29, 2014.

== Surrounding area ==
- Takaoka City Emergency Medical Center
  - Located in the former site of Honmaru Kaikan Hall

←	Service	→
Sakashita-machi	Takaoka Kidō Line	Hirokōji
