= Shin-Yoshihisa Station =

Tram station in Takaoka, Toyama prefecture, Japan

Coordinates: 36°46′34.67″N 137°3′10.74″E

Shin-Yoshihisa Station 新吉久駅
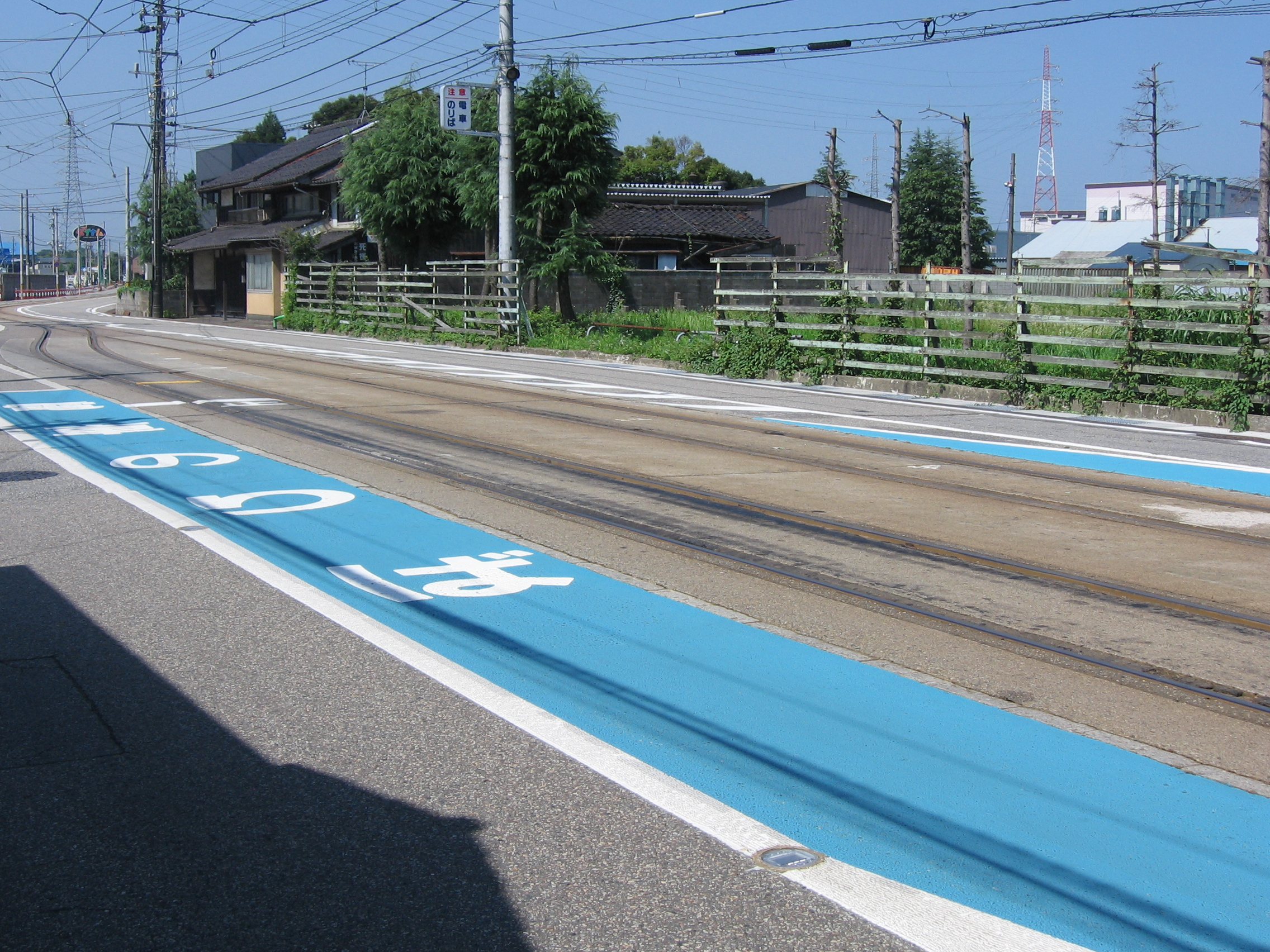

General information
- Location: Takaoka, Toyama Prefecture; Japan
- Operated by: Man'yōsen
- Line: Takaoka Kidō Line
Location

The Shin Yoshihisa Station (新吉久駅, Shin Yoshihisa Eki) is a city tram station on the Takaoka Kidō Line located in Takaoka, Toyama Prefecture, Japan.

←	Service	→
Nōmachiguchi	Takaoka Kidō Line	Yoshihisa
