= Suehirochō Station (Toyama) =

Tram station in Takaoka, Toyama prefecture, Japan

Coordinates: 36°44′39″N 137°00′49″E

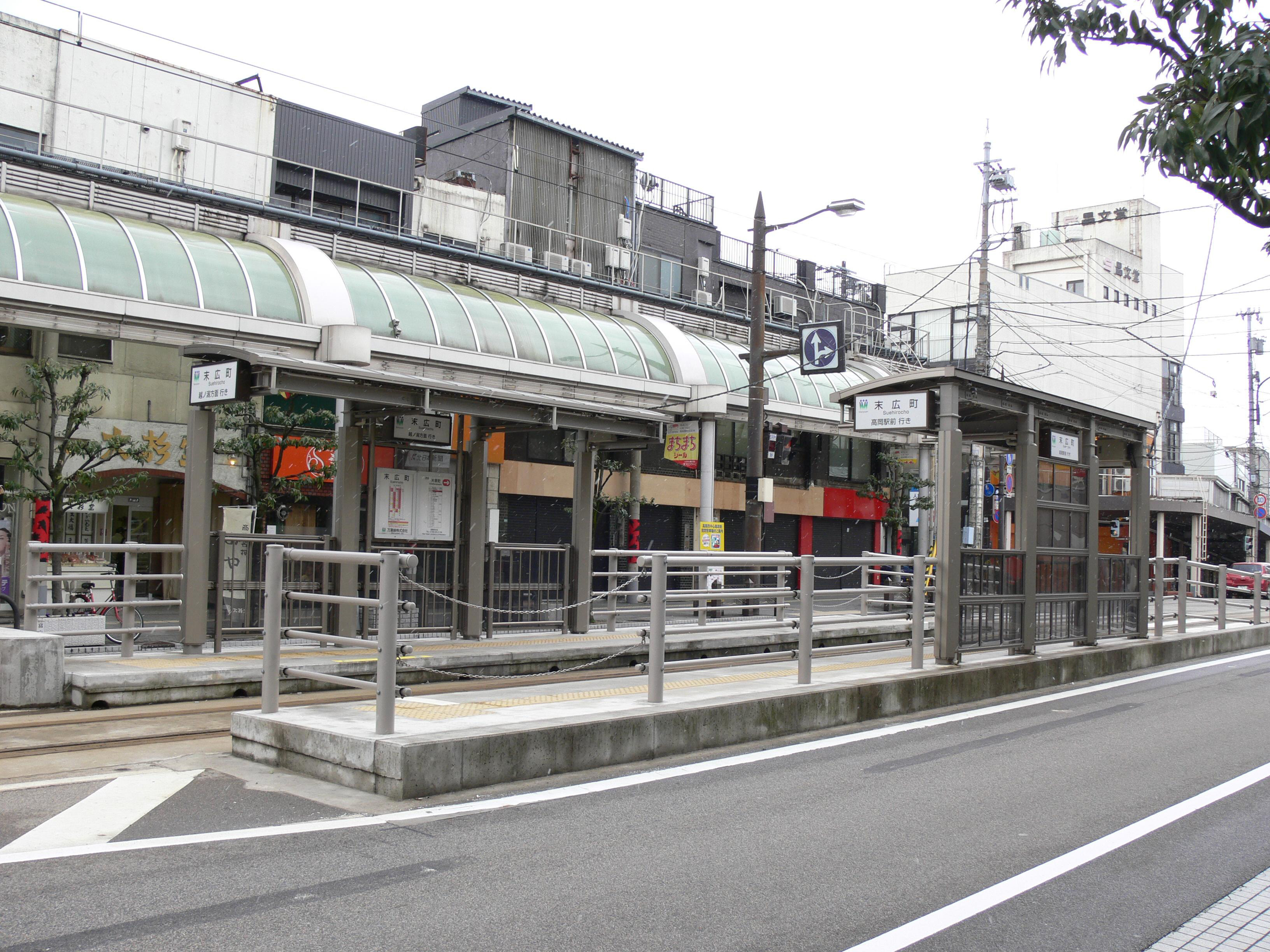
Suehirochō Station.

The Suehirochō Station (末広町駅, Suehirochō Eki) is a city tram station on the Takaoka Kidō Line located in Takaoka, Toyama Prefecture, Japan.

== Surrounding area ==
- Suehirochō Shōtengai
- Otayadōri Shōtengai

== Adjacent stations ==
←	Service	→
Takaoka Station	Takaoka Kidō Line	Kataharamachi
