= Yoshihisa Station =

Tram station in Takaoka, Toyama prefecture, Japan

Coordinates: 36°46′55.86″N 137°3′23.58″E

Yoshihisa Station 吉久駅
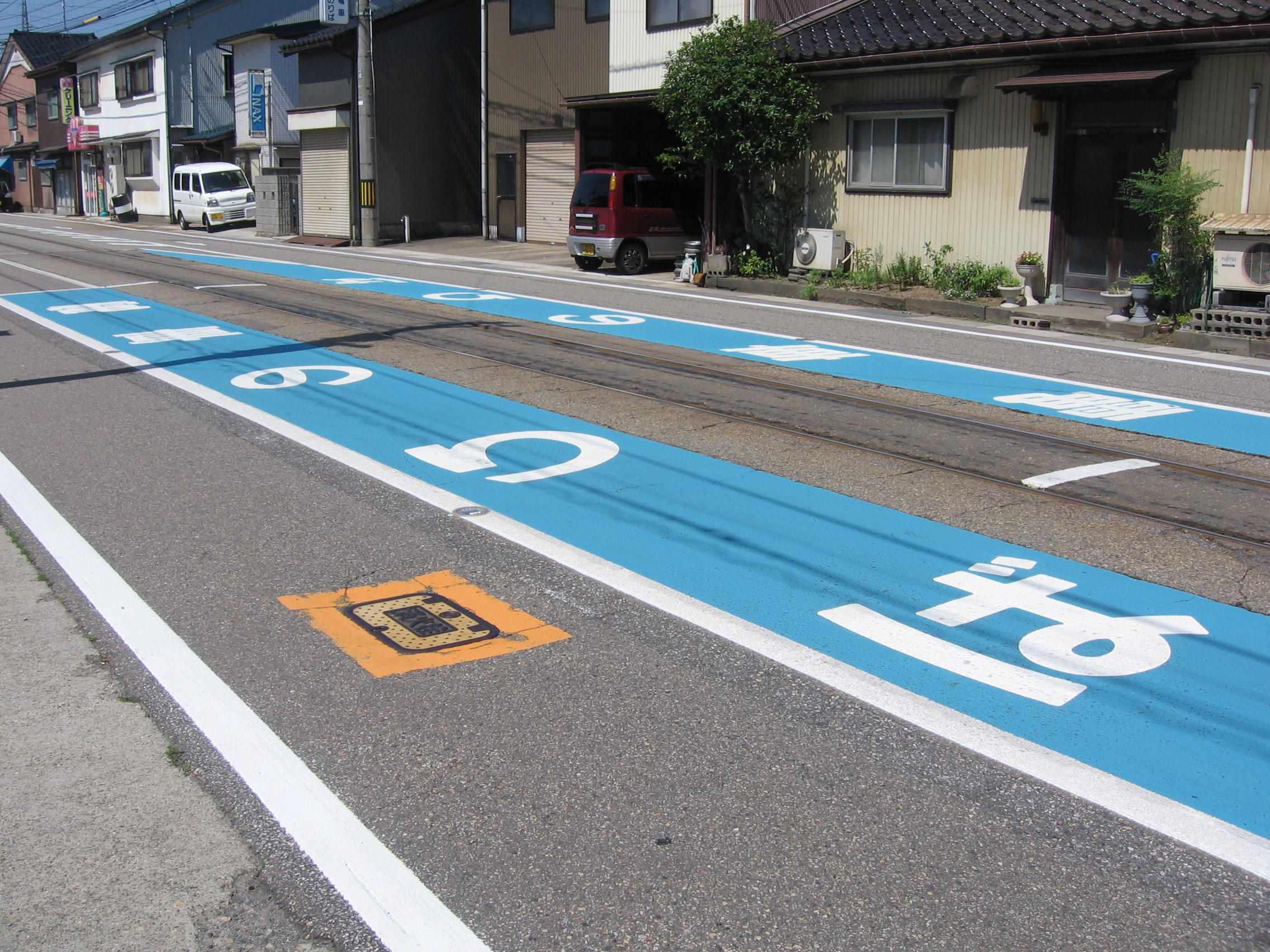

General information
- Location: Takaoka, Toyama Prefecture; Japan
- Operated by: Manyosen.
- Line: Takaoka Kidō Line
Location

The Yoshihisa Station (吉久駅, Yoshihisa Eki) is a city tram station on the Takaoka Kidō Line located in Takaoka, Toyama Prefecture, Japan.

== Structure ==
Yoshihisa Station has one track without raised platforms. The two side platforms by the track are only indicated with white lines on the road.

←	Service	→
Shin Yoshihisa	Takaoka Kidō Line	Naka Fushiki
