= Takaoka, Toyama =

Takaoka 高岡市
- City
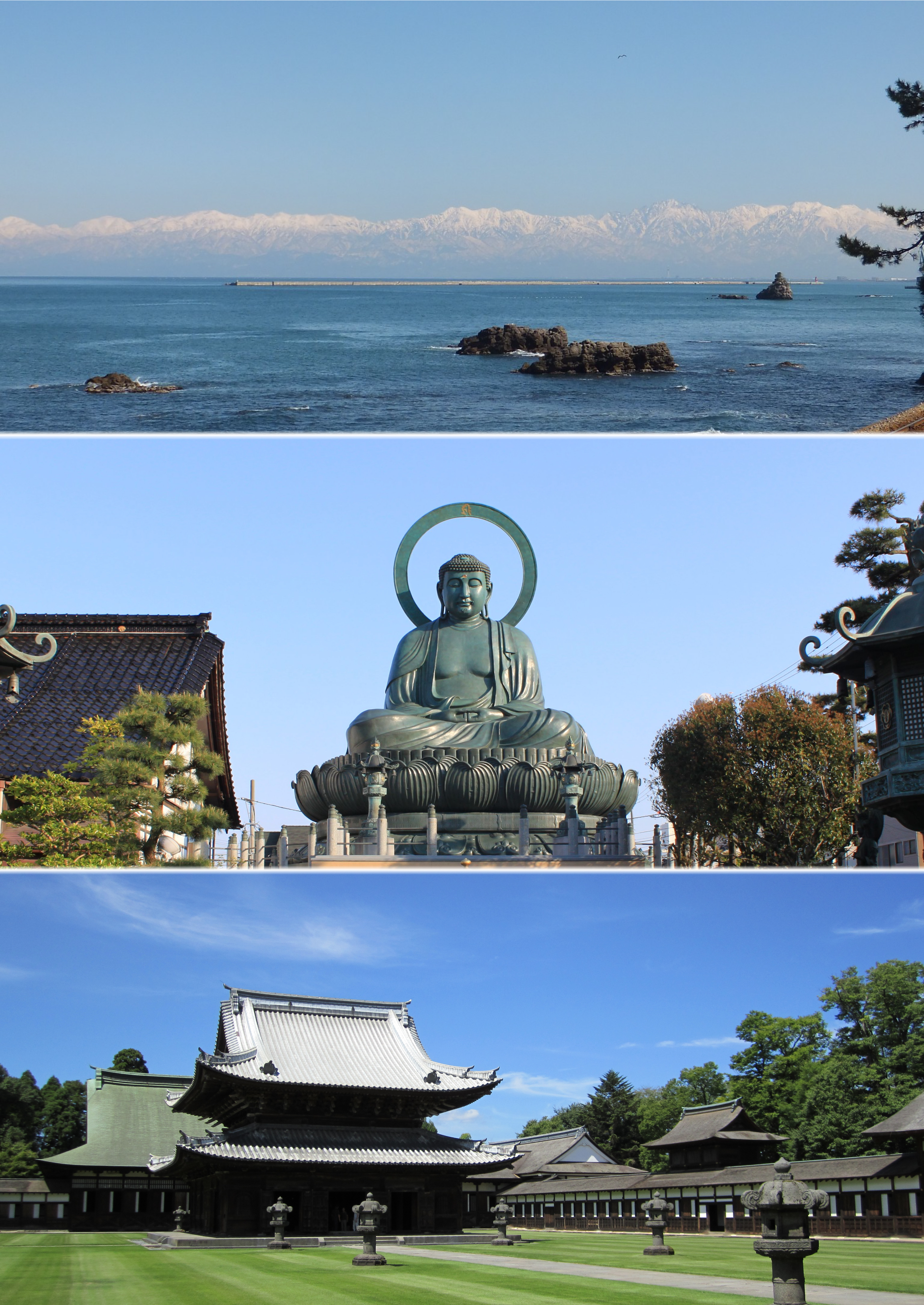
- From top: Tateyama Mountains viewed from Amaharashi Coast, Great Buddha of Takaoka, and Zuiryū-ji Temple

- Flag Seal

- Location of Takaoka in Toyama Prefecture

- Coordinates: 36°45′14.6″N 137°1′32.4″E
- Country: Japan
- Region: Chūbu (Hokuriku)
- Prefecture: Toyama
- First official recorded: 701 AD
- City settled: April 1, 1889

Government
  - Mayor: Yuzuru Demachi (from July 2025)

Area
  - Total: 209.57 km^{2} (80.92 sq mi)

Population (March 10, 2018)
  - Total: 173,086
  - Density: 825.91/km^{2} (2,139.1/sq mi)
- Time zone: UTC+9 (Japan Standard Time)
- Symbols
  - Tree: Japanese bay tree (Tsumama)
  - Flower: Japanese fawn lily (Katakago)
  - Flowering tree: Cherry blossom (Sakura)
- Phone number: 0766-20-1111
- Address: 7-50 Hirokōji, Takaoka-shi, Toyama-ken 933-8601
- Climate: Cfa
- Website: www.city.takaoka.toyama.jp

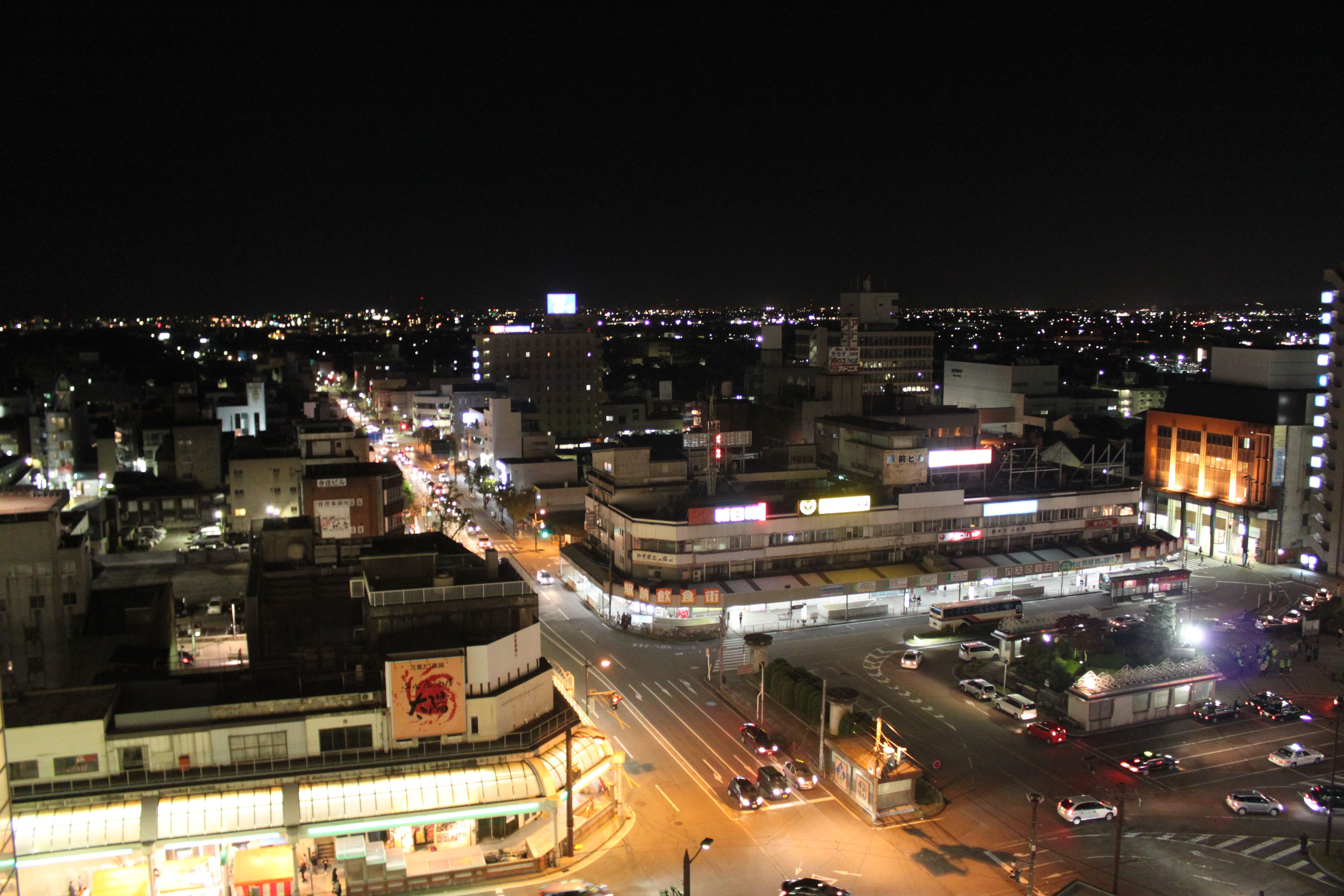
Downtown Takaoka at night

Takaoka (高岡市, Takaoka-shi) is a city in the northwestern portion of Toyama Prefecture, Japan. Takaoka has the second largest population after Toyama City, and the city is a center of western Toyama Prefecture (Gosei (Note: Gosei (呉西) means the west of Kureha hill (呉羽丘陵, Kureha-kyuryo). Meanwhile, eastern Toyama Prefecture is called Goto (呉東) meaning the east of Kureha hill.)).

As of 2018, the city had an estimated population of 173,086 in 68,350 households and a population density of 819 persons per km^{2}. Its total area was 209.57 square kilometres (80.92 sq mi).

== Geography ==
Takaoka covers an area which equates to roughly 5% of the surface area of Toyama Prefecture. The surface area of the city comprises 36.96 km^{2} of real estate, 61.02 km^{2} of agricultural land, 22.69 km^{2} of mountains and forests, 80.43 km^{2} of public property (parks etc.), 6.10 km^{2} of wasteland, and 2.18 km^{2} of moorland.

Takaoka borders four cities in Toyama Prefecture (Himi, Oyabe, Tonami, and Imizu) and two towns in Ishikawa Prefecture (Tsubata and Hōdatsushimizu).

From its border with Himi down to the southwest area of the city, a range of mountains stretch for roughly 150 m to 300 m with a particularly high stretch of mountains centering on Mt. Futagami near Himi. Shogawa River and the Oyabegawa River run through Takaoka, and tributaries weave their way through the city center. Including small rivers, a total of 10 rivers flow through the city. The Amaharashi coast lies to the north of the region. Just off the coast lies the uninhabited offshore rock of Otokoiwa. Another uninhabited rock, Onnaiwa, lies nearby, and the view of this island against the backdrop of the Tateyama range of peaks is famous and features in promotional media for the region. A section of the Imizu plains runs from the central district of the city to the eastern district, and the Tonami plains which stretch from the west to the south are dotted with dispersed settlements in certain areas.

=== Surrounding municipalities ===
- Ishikawa Prefecture
  - Hōdatsushimizu
  - Tsubata
- Toyama Prefecture
  - Himi
1. Imizu
  - Oyabe
  - Tonami

=== Climate ===
The climate of Takaoka is a humid subtropical climate (Köppen climate classification Cfa), similar to that of much of the Sea of Japan coast. All of the regions in Toyama Prefecture can experience large quantities of snow in winter. Depending on the year, the city can experience extraordinarily heavy snowfall, like, for example in 2006 when snow 1.4m high, and in 2011 1.27m was recorded. According to weather records, the average temperature in 2010 was 14.5 °C (58.1 °F), the average level of humidity was 79%, the yearly rainfall was roughly 2,665.5mm and there were 1,634 hours of sunlight.

Climate data for Fushiki, Takaoka, Toyama (1991−2020 normals, extremes 1887−present)
Month	Jan	Feb	Mar	Apr	May	Jun	Jul	Aug	Sep	Oct	Nov	Dec	Year
Record high °C (°F)	20.3 (68.5)	23.3 (73.9)	28.5 (83.3)	32.0 (89.6)	32.5 (90.5)	37.3 (99.1)	38.3 (100.9)	39.7 (103.5)	38.5 (101.3)	34.1 (93.4)	28.9 (84.0)	23.5 (74.3)	39.7 (103.5)
Mean maximum °C (°F)	13.3 (55.9)	15.9 (60.6)	21.7 (71.1)	26.6 (79.9)	29.8 (85.6)	31.2 (88.2)	35.6 (96.1)	36.3 (97.3)	33.6 (92.5)	28.2 (82.8)	22.7 (72.9)	16.7 (62.1)	36.9 (98.4)
Mean daily maximum °C (°F)	6.0 (42.8)	7.0 (44.6)	11.3 (52.3)	16.7 (62.1)	21.6 (70.9)	24.7 (76.5)	29.1 (84.4)	30.9 (87.6)	26.6 (79.9)	21.2 (70.2)	15.3 (59.5)	9.3 (48.7)	18.3 (65.0)
Daily mean °C (°F)	2.9 (37.2)	3.3 (37.9)	6.6 (43.9)	11.7 (53.1)	16.8 (62.2)	20.8 (69.4)	25.1 (77.2)	26.7 (80.1)	22.7 (72.9)	17.0 (62.6)	11.1 (52.0)	5.7 (42.3)	14.2 (57.6)
Mean daily minimum °C (°F)	0.2 (32.4)	0.1 (32.2)	2.5 (36.5)	7.3 (45.1)	12.7 (54.9)	17.8 (64.0)	22.3 (72.1)	23.5 (74.3)	19.4 (66.9)	13.3 (55.9)	7.4 (45.3)	2.6 (36.7)	10.8 (51.4)
Mean minimum °C (°F)	−3.7 (25.3)	−3.8 (25.2)	−1.7 (28.9)	1.6 (34.9)	7.6 (45.7)	13.4 (56.1)	18.9 (66.0)	19.7 (67.5)	13.9 (57.0)	7.3 (45.1)	2.1 (35.8)	−1.7 (28.9)	−4.3 (24.3)
Record low °C (°F)	−12.1 (10.2)	−11.3 (11.7)	−8.7 (16.3)	−2.6 (27.3)	1.8 (35.2)	8.5 (47.3)	12.7 (54.9)	14.0 (57.2)	8.4 (47.1)	1.8 (35.2)	−0.9 (30.4)	−8.7 (16.3)	−12.1 (10.2)
Average precipitation mm (inches)	272.7 (10.74)	161.6 (6.36)	150.6 (5.93)	121.9 (4.80)	115.4 (4.54)	159.4 (6.28)	223.8 (8.81)	194.2 (7.65)	205.0 (8.07)	161.2 (6.35)	221.3 (8.71)	294.0 (11.57)	2,281 (89.80)
Average snowfall cm (inches)	107 (42)	71 (28)	15 (5.9)	1 (0.4)	0 (0)	0 (0)	0 (0)	0 (0)	0 (0)	0 (0)	0 (0)	46 (18)	238 (94)
Average precipitation days (≥ 0.5 mm)	24.4	19.8	17.8	13.6	11.8	11.0	13.7	10.9	14.1	13.9	18.4	23.3	192.7
Average snowy days (≥ 1 cm)	12.7	10.2	2.9	0.2	0	0	0	0	0	0	0.1	5.5	31.6
Average relative humidity (%)	81	77	71	69	72	79	80	77	77	75	76	80	76
Mean monthly sunshine hours	61.1	85.7	137.6	176.4	204.6	158.8	160.3	205.5	147.3	146.3	104.6	66.8	1,650.1
Source: Japan Meteorological Agency

== Demographics ==
Per Japanese census data, the population of Takaoka has declined over the past 40 years.

Historical population
Year	Pop.	±%
1970	170,841	—
1980	186,900	+9.4%
1990	187,869	+0.5%
2000	185,682	−1.2%
2010	176,061	−5.2%
2020	166,393	−5.5%

=== Foreign population ===
As of 2011, the Brazilian population of Takaoka was approximately 1,430 residents, the Chinese population was approximately 700, and the Philippine population was approximately 360.

== History ==
The area of present-day Takaoka was part of ancient Etchū Province, and the provincial capital was located in what are now the outskirts of the modern city. Ōtomo no Yakamochi took office as a government official in this area in the 8th century. During his five-year stay, he wrote many waka poems. This is the reason for Takaoka being nicknamed Manyō City.

Originally, the Takaoka region was called Sekino, but when Maeda Toshinaga of Kaga Domain took control of the city in 1609, he named it after a verse from the religious poem Shihen which includes the word Takaoka. In addition to this, the fact that Takaoka Castle was built on a slightly elevated shoreline is thought to be another possible origin for the name Takaoka, since Taka means "high" and Oka means "hill or elevated land".

Despite the loss of its castle due to orders from the Tokugawa shogunate in 1615, the Maeda clan pursued policies regulating the relocation of Takaoka citizens and promoting the development of Takaoka as an industrial city. This resulted in the start of Takaoka's role as a city of commerce and industry. Takaoka copperware and lacquerware also took off at this time.

Following the Meiji restoration, with the establishment of the municipalities system on April 1, 1889, Takaoka was registered as one of Japan's first 30 cities. The area around Fushiki Port was declared an open port for foreign trade by Imperial decree in July 1899.

On November 1, 2005, the town of Fukuoka (from Nishitonami District) was merged into Takaoka. Nishitonami District was dissolved as a result of this merger.

== Government ==
Takaoka has a mayor-council form of government with a directly elected mayor, and a unicameral city legislature of 27 members. The city contributes seven members to the Toyama Prefectural Assembly. In terms of national politics, the city is part of the Toyama Third Electoral District for the lower house of the Diet of Japan.

== Education ==
=== Colleges and universities ===
- University of Toyama - Takaoka campus
- Takaoka University of Law

=== Primary and secondary education ===
Takaoka has 26 public elementary schools and 12 public junior high schools operated by the town government, and eight public high schools operated by the Toyama Prefectural Board of Education. There are also three private high schools. The city also operates one special education school, and an additional four special education schools are operated by the Toyama Prefectural government.

== Transportation ==
=== Railway ===
- West Japan Railway Company (JR West) - Hokuriku Shinkansen
  - Shin-Takaoka
- West Japan Railway Company (JR West) - Himi Line
  - Takaoka - Etchū-Nakagawa - Nōmachi - Fushiki - Etchū-Kokubu - Amaharashi
- West Japan Railway Company (JR West) - Jōhana Line
  - Takaoka - Shin-Takaoka - Futatsuka - Hayashi - Toide
- Ainokaze Toyama Railway
  - Fukuoka - Nishi-Takaoka - Takaoka-Yabunami - Takaoka
- Manyosen - Takaoka Kidō Line
  - Takaoka Station - Suehirochō - Kataharamachi - Sakashitamachi - Kyūkan Iryō Center-mae - Hirokōji - Shikino Chūgakkō-mae - Shimin Byōin-mae - Ejiri - Asahigaoka - Ogino - Shin-Nōmachi - Yonejimaguchi -Nōmachiguchi - Shin-Yoshihisa - Yoshihisa
- Manyosen - Shinminatokō Line
  - Naka Shinminato

=== Highway ===
- Hokuriku Expressway
- National Route 8
- National Route 156
- National Route 160
- National Route 415

== International relations ==
- Mirandópolis, São Paulo, Brazil, sister city since 1974
- Fort Wayne, Indiana, United States, sister city since 1977
- Jinzhou, Liaoning, China, friendship city since 1985

== Local attractions ==
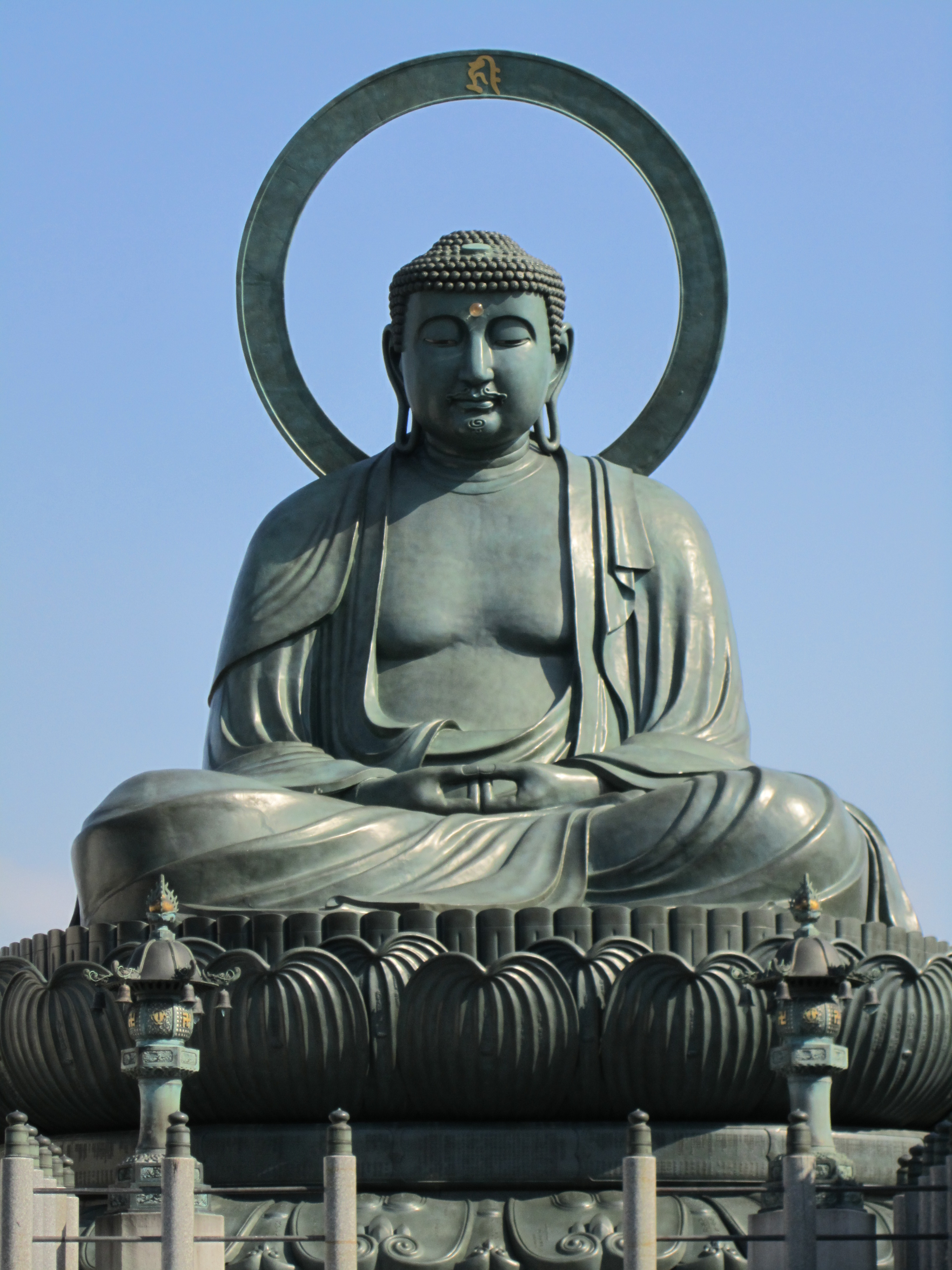
Great Buddha of Takaoka

- Great Buddha of Takaoka
  Reaching a height of nearly 16 metres (52 ft), the Great Buddha of Takaoka is the third largest in Japan. The current Buddha made of Takaoka bronze was completed in 1933 after the previous statue made of wood burnt down. The Buddha is situated next to the Daibutsu Temple in the middle of a residential area in Takaoka town centre.
- Takaoka Kojo Park
  Takaoka Kojo Park, the former site of the Takaoka Castle, is situated a short walk from the centre of Takaoka. Within the park grounds, there are the Imizu Shrine, the Takaoka Museum, Takaoka Zoo, the Civic Hall, and Civic Gymnasium, plus abundant nature. The moat surrounding the centre of the park is a common spot for cherry blossom viewing in spring.

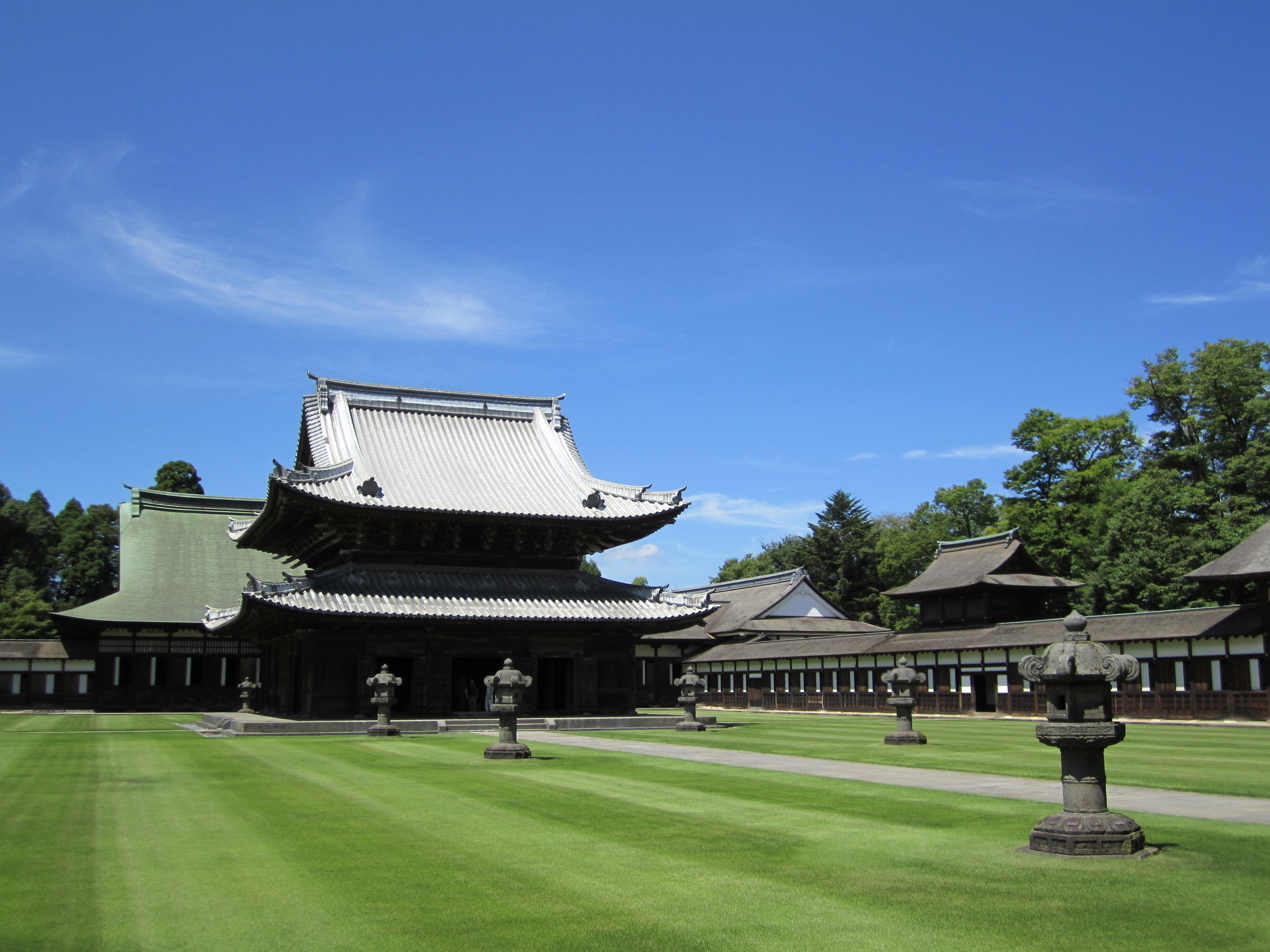
Zuiryū-ji Temple

- Zuiryū-ji Temple
  Completed in 1663, Zuiryū-ji temple, is just south of Takaoka Station and a designated National Treasure of Japan. This Zen temple was constructed to mourn for the death of Maeda Toshinaga who fortified Takaoka, and is celebrated as being reminiscent of architecture from the early Edo period.
- Amaharashi Coast
  The Amaharashi Coast, located north of Takaoka city has sandy beaches and views of the Onnaiwa Rock against the backdrop of the Tateyama mountains.
- Kanayamachi
  Kanayamachi is an area of Takaoka which has traditional buildings, both warehouses and houses, which have been preserved since the Meiji period. It is the birthplace of the manufacture of Takaoka copperware.
- Sakuradani Kofun
  The Sakuradani Kofun is group of kofun burial mounds, two of which are designated as a National Historic Site of Japan.

== Festivals ==
- Takaoka Mikurumayama Festival (May 1)
  The tradition of this festival started when Maeda Toshinaga received a float from Hideyoshi, a powerful figure at the time, and gave it to the people of Takaoka. The festival features seven floats, crafted in the brightly colored Momoyama style, which make their way around the streets of Takaoka.

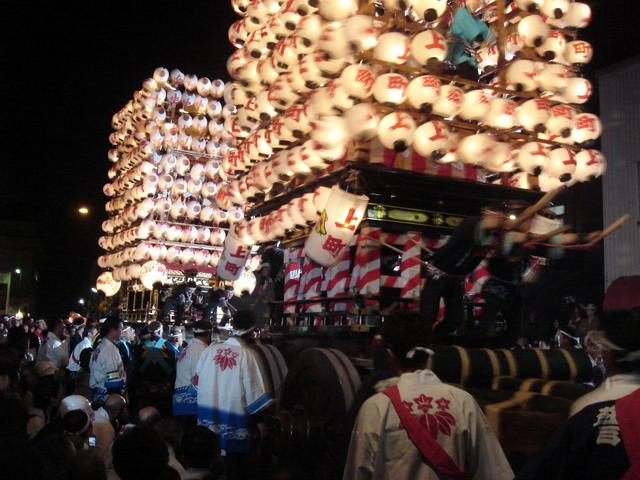
Fushiki Hikiyama Festival (Fushiki, Takaoka)

- Fushiki Hikiyama Festival (May 15)
  The Hikiyama festival in the port town of Fushiki is called 'Kenkayama' (fighting floats) by locals. During the day, the floats are adorned with flowers, and at night they are decorated with paper lanterns. The floats are rammed into each other to the beat of the yamaga war drums.
- Goin Festival (June 19/20)
  The Goin festival celebrates the kindness of Maeda Toshinaga who took care of the city's casters, by worshipping documents with his seal on. During the festival, the Yagaefu dance (a processional dance performed with bamboo sticks) is also performed on the streets of Kanayamachi.

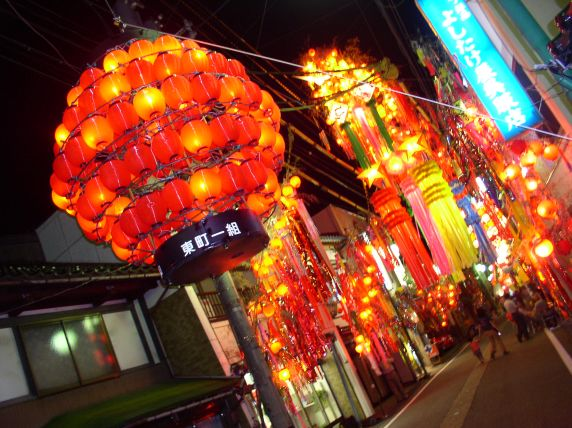
Toide Tanabata Festival (Toide, Takaoka)

- Toide Tanabata Festival (July 3–7)
  A large collection of around 1,000 tanabata of various sizes, including 20 metres (66 ft) tall jumbo tanabata, make a large tunnel that serves as an archway into the town's main street.
- Takaoka Tanabata Festival (Early August)
  The Takaoka Tanabata Festival is a symbol of summertime, when the streets are lined with thousands of large tanabata to celebrate the union of Orihime and Hikoboshi, two deities who, according to legend, are only allowed to meet once a year.
- Fukuoka Tsukurimon Festival (23/24 September)
  The Tsukurimon festival is a festival with more than 300 years of history. Sculptures depicting local sights and famous characters are made out of fruits and vegetables and displayed throughout the town.
- Nakada Scarecrow Festival (late September)
  Depicting current events and famous characters, scarecrows are made using everyday materials such as straw and wood and displayed around the main shopping area of the Nakada district.
- Takaoka Manyō Festival (first weekend of October)
  This major autumn event celebrates the Manyō tradition with a marathon poetry recital lasting three days and three nights. The entire Manyō poetry anthology is recited by a large number of participants in a relay fashion.
- Takaoka Nabe Festival (mid-January)
  Fresh fish and shellfish from the Sea of Japan are cooked in large cauldrons made with local casting techniques.

== Notable people from Takaoka ==
- Kinjirō Ashiwara (1850–1937), also known as Shogun Ashiwara (葦原将軍, Ashiwara Shōgun)
- Hiroshi Fujimoto (1933–1996), manga artist created several characters including the globally famous Doraemon. He formed a manga artist duo Fujiko Fujio together with Motoo Abiko.
- Tadamasa Hayashi (1853–1906), art dealer who introduced traditional Japanese art to Europe.
- Tomomi Hayashi (b. 1971), architect
- Yoshie Hotta (1918–1998), writer who won the Akutagawa Prize.
- Shihoko Ishii (b. 1950), mathematician
- Eiichi Kanamori (1908–2001), a recognized Important Intangible Cultural Asset (a "Living National Treasure") as a leading metal engraver of Takaoka copperware.
- Izumi Matsumoto (1958–2020), manga artist
- Sosen Mishima (1876–1934), author and theatre critic whose career took off at the start of the 20th century after his work 'Kaiboshitsu' (Dissecting Room) was published in the Chuo Koron literary magazine.
- Shoichiro Mukai (b. 1996), judoka who won a silver medal at the 2020 Summer Olympics.
- Kingetsu Murozaki (1891–1977), composer and founder of the Chuo School of Music, Tokyo. Known for 'Yuhi' (Sunset), a song which he wrote about the view of sunset at Takaoka Kojo Park.
- Namori, manga artist and author of YuruYuri, which takes place in the fictional Nanamori area of Takaoka.
- Komin Ozawa (1941–2023), a recognized Important Intangible Cultural Asset (a "Living National Treasure"). He was known as the master of the Chukin casting technique of making utensils and vessels by pouring molten metal into a mould.
- Noriko Shinohara (b. 1953), fine artist
- Keiichiro Tachibana (b. 1961), politician
- Takamine Jōkichi (1854–1922), scientist specializing in engineering and pharmacology. He was joint founder of the RIKEN Natural Sciences Institute and discoverer of Adrenaline.
- Yōjirō Takita (b. 1955), filmmaker whose 2008 film Okuribito won a US Academy award for Best Foreign Language Film.
- Eri Tosaka (b. 1993), freestyle wrestler who won a gold medal at the 2016 Summer Olympics.
