= Ejiri Station =

Tram station in Takaoka, Toyama prefecture, Japan

Coordinates: 36.7622493°N 137.0306468°E

Ejiri Station 江尻駅
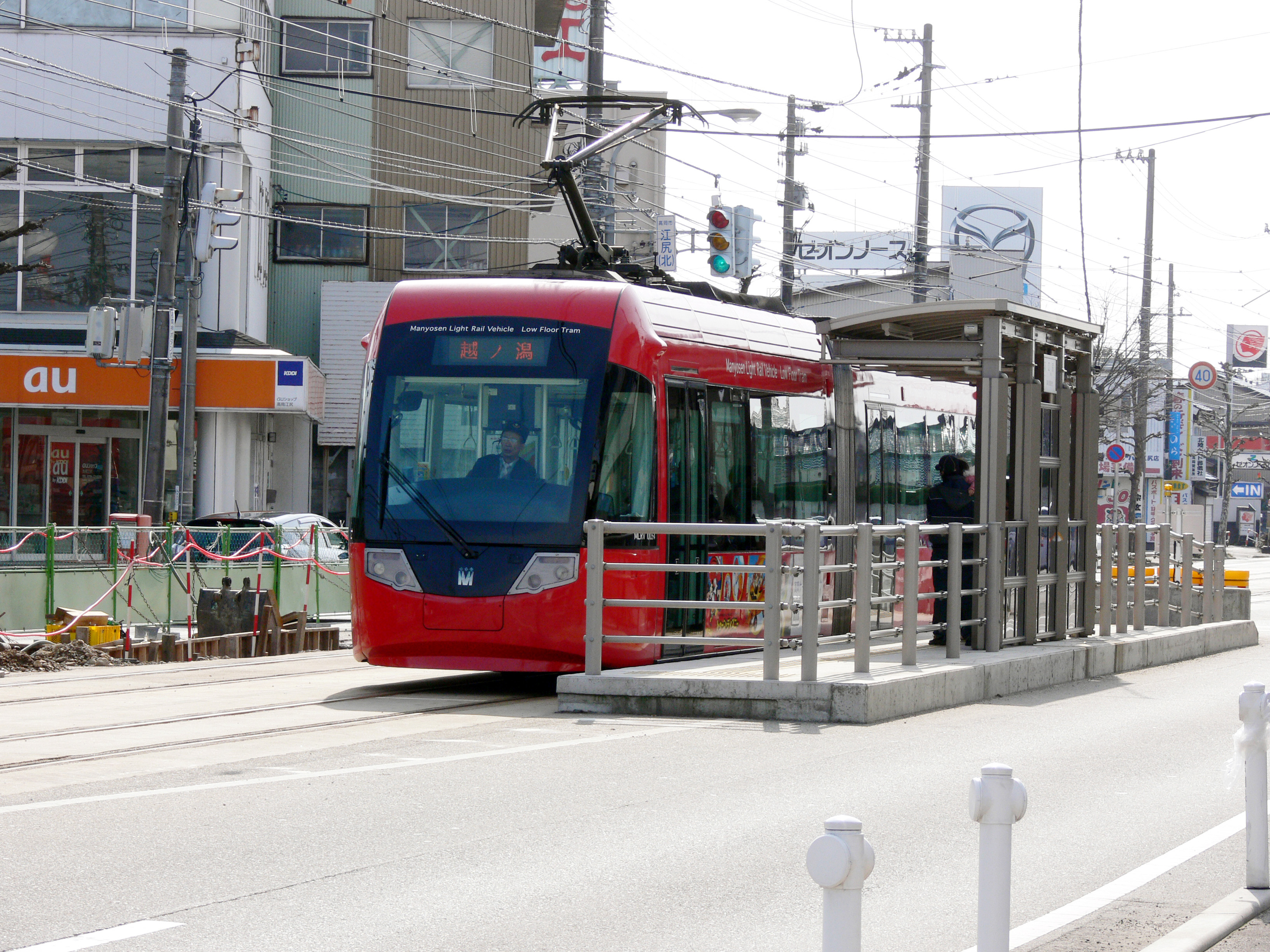

General information
- Location: Takaoka, Toyama Prefecture, Japan
- Operated by: Man'yosen
- Line: Takaoka Kidō Line
Location

Ejiri Station (江尻駅, Ejiri Eki) is a city tram station on the Takaoka Kidō Line located in Takaoka, Toyama Prefecture, Japan.

== Surrounding area ==
- JUSCO Takaoka

←	Service	→
Shiminbyōin-mae	Takaoka Kidō Line	Asahigaoka
