= Fukumitsu Station =

Railway station in Nanto, Toyama Prefecture, Japan

Fukumitsu Station 福光駅
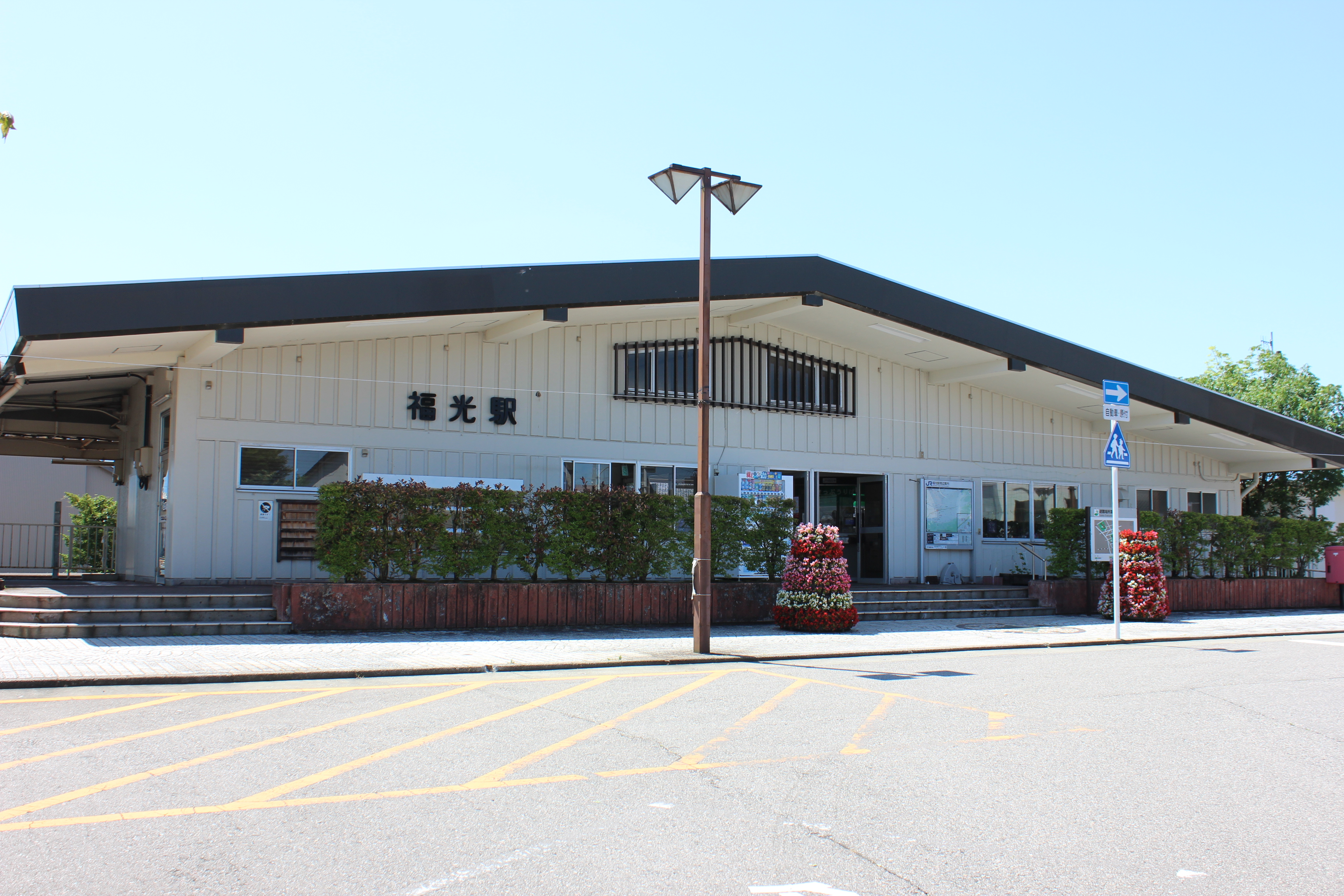
- Fukumitsu Station in June 2020

General information
- Location: 5327 Araki, Nanto-shi, Toyama-ken 939-1732; Japan
- Coordinates: 36.5584°N 136.8779°E
- Operator: JR West
- Line: ■ Jōhana Line
- Distance: 24.7 km from Takaoka
- Platforms: 2 side platforms
- Tracks: 2

Construction
- Structure type: At grade

Other information
- Status: Staffed (Midori no Madoguchi)
- Website: Official website

History
- Opened: 10 August 1951; 75 years ago

Passengers
- FY2015: 525 daily
Location
- Location within Japan

Fukumitsu Station (福光駅, Fukumitsu-eki) is a railway station on the Jōhana Line in city of Nanto, Toyama, Japan, operated by West Japan Railway Company (JR West).

== Lines ==
Fukumitsu Station is a station on the Jōhana Line, and is located 24.7 kilometers from the end of the line at Takaoka.

== Layout ==
The station has two opposed ground-level side platforms serving two tracks, connected to the station building by a level crossing. The station has a Midori no Madoguchi staffed ticket office.

=== Platforms ===
1	■ Jōhana Line	for Takaoka
2	■ Jōhana Line	for Jōhana

== Adjacent stations ==
«	Service	»
Jōhana Line
Higashi-Ishiguro	-	Etchū-Yamada

== History ==
The station opened on 18 August 1897. With the privatization of Japanese National Railways (JNR) on 1 April 1987, the station came under the control of JR West.

== Passenger statistics ==
In fiscal 2015, the station was used by an average of 570 passengers daily (boarding passengers only).

== Surrounding area ==
- Fukumitsu-Araki Post Office
- YOshie Junior High School
- Japan National Route 304

== See also ==
- List of railway stations in Japan
