= List of cultural properties of Japan – paintings (Toyama) =

This list is of the cultural properties of Japan designated in the category of paintings (絵画, kaiga) for the Prefecture of Toyama.

== National Cultural Properties ==
As of 1 January 2015, three Important Cultural Properties have been designated, being of national significance.

Property	Date	Municipality	Ownership	Comments	Image	Dimensions	Coordinates	Ref.
Lotus Sutra Mandala, colour on silk 絹本著色法華経曼荼羅図 kenpon chakushoku Hoke-kyō mandara zu	1326-28	Toyama	Honpō-ji (本法寺)	21 scrolls			36°33′11″N 137°09′45″E	
Scenes in and around the Capital, colours on paper with gold ground 紙本金地著色洛中洛外図〈／六曲屏風〉 shihon kinji chakushoku rakuchū rakugai zu (rokkyoku byōbu)	Momoyama period	Takaoka	Shōkō-ji (勝興寺) (kept at the Takaoka Municipal Museum (高岡市立博物館))	pair of six-panel screens			36°44′47″N 137°01′16″E	
Ittō Ryōson (one stupa two deities) - Nichiren - Kishimojin and the Ten Rasetsunyo - Thirty Guardian Deities colour on silk, by Hasegawa Tōhaku 紙本著色一塔両尊像〈長谷川信春筆／〉 紙本著色日蓮像〈長谷川信春筆／〉 紙本著色鬼子母神十羅刹女像〈長谷川信春筆／〉 絹本著色三十番神像〈長谷川信春筆／〉 kenpon chakushoku ittō ryōson zō (Hasegawa Tōhaku hitsu) kenpon chakushoku Nichiren zō (Hasegawa Tōhaku hitsu) kenpon chakushoku Kishimojin jū-rasetsunyo zō (Hasegawa Tōhaku hitsu) kenpon chakushoku sanjū banshin zō (Hasegawa Tōhaku hitsu)	1564-66	Takaoka	Daihō-ji (大法寺)	four scrolls		86.0 centimetres (2 ft 9.9 in) by 40.0 centimetres (1 ft 3.7 in); 85.7 centimetres (2 ft 9.7 in) by 40.5 centimetres (1 ft 3.9 in); 86.4 centimetres (2 ft 10.0 in) by 39.9 centimetres (1 ft 3.7 in); 94.7 centimetres (3 ft 1.3 in) by 39.0 centimetres (1 ft 3.4 in)	36°44′48″N 137°00′27″E	

== Prefectural Cultural Properties ==
As of 1 January 2015, twelve properties have been designated at a prefectural level.

Property	Date	Municipality	Ownership	Comments	Image	Dimensions	Coordinates	Ref.
Monju Bosatsu Riding a Lion, colour on silk 絹本著色騎獅文殊菩薩像 kenpon chakushoku kishi Monju bosatsu zō	early Kamakura period	Toyama	Raikō-ji (来迎寺)				36°40′59″N 137°13′16″E	
Shōtoku Taishi Aged 16, colour on silk 絹本著色聖徳太子孝養像図 kenpon chakushoku Shōtoku Taishi kōyō-zō zu		Toyama	private				36°41′02″N 137°12′54″E	
Nichiren Shū Honzon Mandala, colour on silk 絹本著色日蓮宗本尊曼荼羅図 kenpon chakushoku Nichiren-shū honzon mandara zu	Momoyama period	Takaoka	Daihō-ji (大法寺)	the title of the 南無妙法蓮華経; by Hasegawa Tōhaku			36°44′48″N 137°00′27″E	
Pure Land based on the Amitayurdhyana Sutra, colour on silk 絹本著色観経浄土変相図 kenpon chakushoku kangyō jōdo hensō zu	Kamakura period	Imizu	Mandara-ji (曼陀羅寺)				36°46′46″N 137°05′21″E	
Blue Fudō, colour on silk 絹本著色青不動 kenpon chakushoku ao Fudō	late Kamakura period	Imizu	Mandara-ji (曼陀羅寺)				36°46′46″N 137°05′21″E	
Standing Yakushi Nyorai, colour on silk 絹本著色薬師如来立像 kenpon chakushoku Yakushi Nyorai ryū-zō	Kamakura period	Tonami	Jōfuku-ji (常福寺)				36°39′14″N 136°58′59″E	
Daiitoku Myōō, colour on silk 絹本著色大威徳明王図 kenpon chakushoku Daiitoku Myōō zu	early Muromachi period	Tonami	Senkō-ji (千光寺)				36°38′10″N 137°01′55″E	
Mandala of the Two Realms, colour on silk 絹本著色両界曼荼羅図 kenpon chakushoku ryōkai mandara zu	late Kamakura period	Tonami	Senkō-ji (千光寺)	pair of scrolls with supplementary scroll			36°38′10″N 137°01′55″E	
Nirvana Painting, colour on silk 絹本著色仏涅槃図 kenpon chakushoku Butsu nehan zu	Nanboku-chō period	Toyama	Ōyama Centre for Administration (大山総合行政センター)				36°36′08″N 136°53′08″E	
Ema at Angō-ji 安居寺の絵馬; Angōji no ema	Momoyama period	Nanto	Angō-ji (安居寺)	three ema; said to be the work of Kanō Eitoku and his pupil Sanraku			36°36′08″N 136°53′08″E	
Kitano Shrine Okuni Kabuki Byōbu 北野神社阿国歌舞伎図; Kitano Jinja Okuni kabuki zu	early Edo period	Nanto	Fukuno Shimeisha (福野神明社)				36°35′36″N 136°55′19″E	
Three Thousand Buddhas, colour on silk 絹本著色三千仏図 kenpon chakushoku sanzen butsu zu	Muromachi period	Toyama	split between Tairyū-ji (帝龍寺), Ōyama Historical Folk Material Museum (富山市大山歴史民俗資料館), and Ōyama Centre for Administration (大山総合行政センター)	three scrolls			36°33′48″N 137°13′52″E	

== See also ==
- Cultural Properties of Japan
- List of National Treasures of Japan (paintings)
- Japanese painting
- List of Cultural Properties of Japan - historical materials (Toyama)
- List of Historic Sites of Japan (Toyama)
