= Tonami Station =

Railway station in Tonami, Toyama Prefecture, Japan

Tonami Station 砺波駅
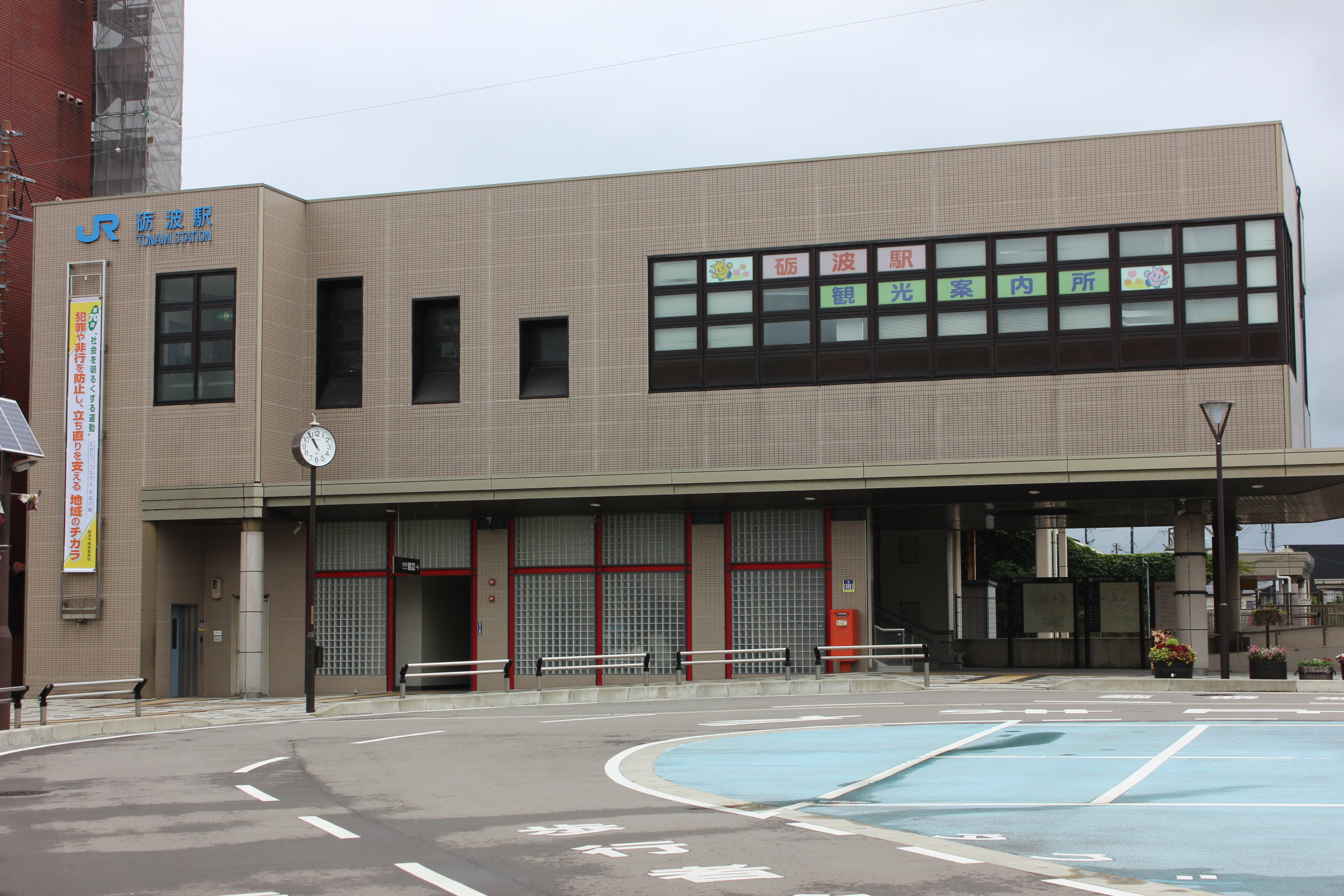
- Tonami Station North Exit (former called West exit) in July 2020

General information
- Location: 1-1-1 Omotemachi, Tonami-shi, Toyama-ken 939-1374; Japan
- Coordinates: 36.6364°N 136.9537°E
- Operator: JR West
- Line: ■ Jōhana Line
- Distance: 13.3 km from Takaoka
- Platforms: 2 side platforms
- Tracks: 2

Construction
- Structure type: At grade

Other information
- Status: Staffed (Midori no Madoguchi)
- Website: Official website

History
- Opened: 4 May 1897; 129 years ago
- Rebuilt: 1994; 32 years ago
- Former names: Demachi Station (to 1954)

Passengers
- FY2015: 1189 daily
Location
- Location within Japan

Tonami Station (砺波駅, Tonami-eki) is a railway station on the Jōhana Line in the city of Tonami, Toyama, Japan, operated by West Japan Railway Company (JR West).

== Lines ==
Tonami Station is a station on the Jōhana Line, and is located 13.3 kilometers from the end of the line at Takaoka.

== Layout ==
The station has two ground-level opposed side platforms serving two tracks with an elevated station building. The station has a Midori no Madoguchi staffed ticket office.

=== Platforms ===
1	■ Jōhana Line	for Takaoka
2	■ Jōhana Line	for Jōhana

== Adjacent stations ==
«	Service	»
Jōhana Line
Aburaden	-	Higashi-Nojiri

== History ==
The station opened on 4 May 1897 as Demachi Station (出町駅). It was renamed to its present name on 10 November 1954. With the privatization of Japanese National Railways (JNR) on 1 April 1987, the station came under the control of JR West. A new station building was completed in April 1994.

== Passenger statistics ==
In fiscal 2015, the station was used by an average of 1,189 passengers daily (boarding passengers only).

== Surrounding area ==
- Tonami General Hospital
- Tonami Art Museum
- Tonami Post Office
- National Route 156
- National Route 359

== See also ==
- List of railway stations in Japan
