= Fukuno Station =

Fukuno Station may refer to:

- Fukuno Station (Gifu), a railway station in Gifu Prefecture, Japan
- Fukuno Station (Toyama), a railway station in Toyama Prefecture, Japan
