= List of cultural properties of Japan – historical materials (Toyama) =

This list is of the cultural properties of Japan designated in the category of historical materials (歴史資料, rekishi shiryō) for the Prefecture of Toyama.

== National Cultural Properties ==
As of 1 January 2015, one Important Cultural Property has been designated, being of national significance.

Property	Date	Municipality	Ownership	Comments	Image	Coordinates	Ref.
Materials relating to Ishiguro Nobuyoshi 石黒信由関係資料; Ishiguro Nobuyoshi kankei shiryō	Edo period	Imizu	Imizu City Shinminato Museum (射水市新湊博物館)	3,764 items		36°45′09″N 137°05′05″E	

== Prefectural Cultural Properties ==
As of 1 January 2015, six properties have been designated at a prefectural level.

Property	Date	Municipality	Ownership	Comments	Image	Coordinates	Ref.
Treasures dedicated by the Maeda Family 前田家寄進の宝物; Maeda-ke kishin no takaramono		Takaoka	Zuiryū-ji (瑞龍寺)	42 items, comprising 17 paintings, 23 calligraphic works, and 2 craftworks		36°44′08″N 137°00′38″E	
Treasures of Shōkō-ji 勝興寺宝物; Shōkōji takaramono		Takaoka	Shōkō-ji (勝興寺)	237 items, comprising 15 paintings, 1 sculpture, 180 old texts, 13 calligraphic works, and 28 craftworks		36°47′35″N 137°03′10″E	
Survey Materials of the Kiyoto Family 清都家測量器具等関係資料; Kiyoto-ke sokuryō kigu-tō kankei shiryō		Takaoka	private kept at the Takaoka Municipal Museum (高岡市立博物館)	98 items		36°44′47″N 137°01′16″E	
Takagi Library Materials 高樹文庫資料; Takagi bunko shiryō	Edo period	Imizu	Imizu City Shinminato Museum (射水市新湊博物館)	8,506 items		36°45′09″N 137°05′05″E	
Kawai Library 川合文庫; Kawai bunko		Tateyama	Toyama Prefecture (kept at the Tateyama Museum (立山博物館))			36°34′51″N 137°24′03″E	
Treasures of Zentoku-ji 善徳寺宝物; Zentokuji takaramono		Nanto	Zentoku-ji (善徳寺)	144 items		36°30′58″N 136°54′05″E	

== See also ==
- Cultural Properties of Japan
- List of National Treasures of Japan (historical materials)
- List of Historic Sites of Japan (Toyama)
- Etchū Province
- List of Cultural Properties of Japan - paintings (Toyama)
