= Etchū-Yamada Station =

Railway station in Nanto, Toyama Prefecture, Japan

Etchū-Yamada Station 越中山田駅
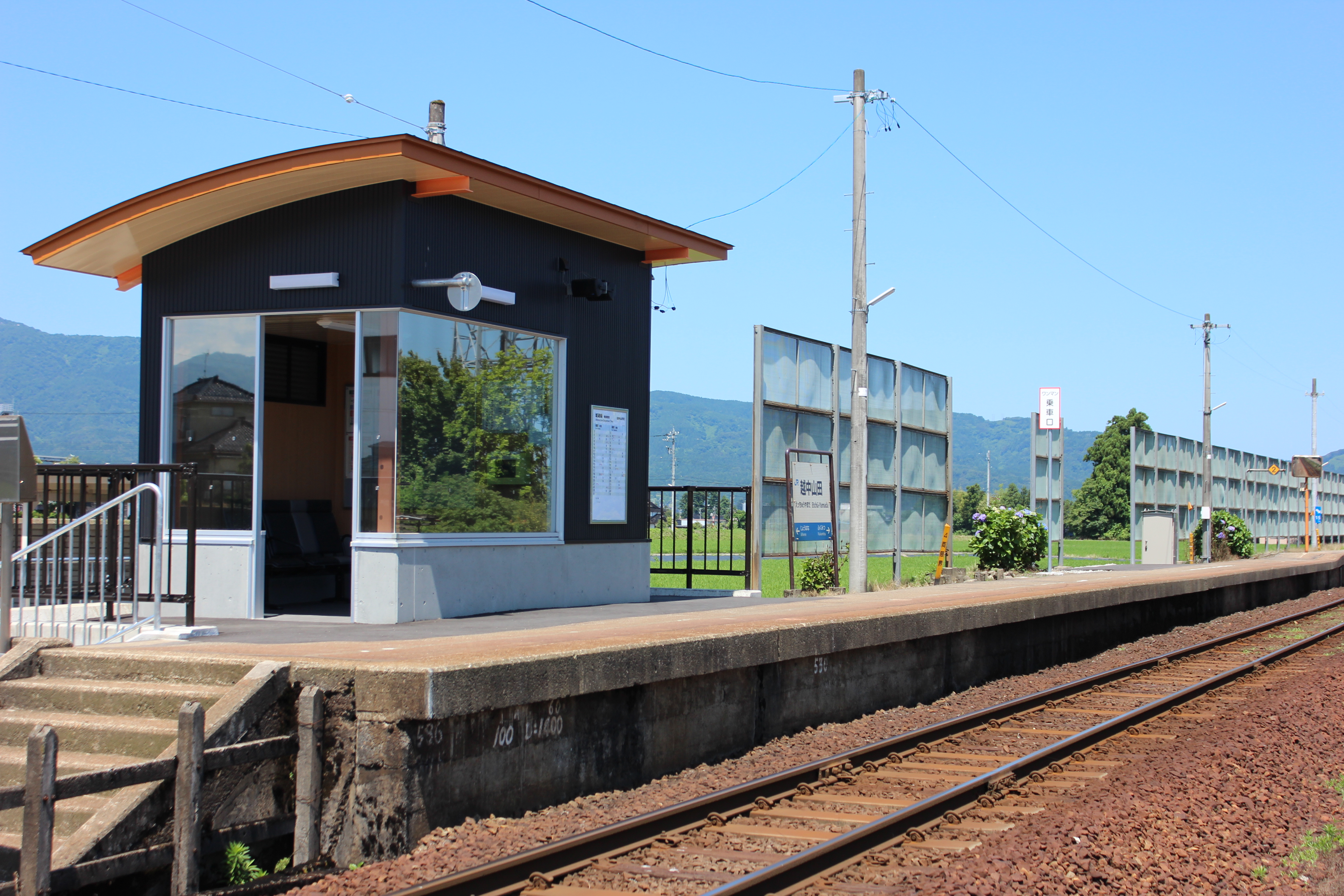
- A new waiting room on the platform of Etchū-Yamada Station in June 2020

General information
- Location: 586 Takebayashi, Nanto-shi, Toyama-ken 939-1734; Japan
- Coordinates: 36.5386°N 136.8877°E
- Operator: JR West
- Line: ■ Jōhana Line
- Distance: 27.5 km from Takaoka
- Platforms: 1 side platform
- Tracks: 1

Construction
- Structure type: At grade

Other information
- Status: Unstaffed
- Website: Official website

History
- Opened: 10 August 1951; 75 years ago

Passengers
- FY2015: 39 daily
Location
- Location within Japan

Etchū-Yamada Station (越中山田駅, Etchū-Yamada-eki) is a railway station on the Jōhana Line in city of Nanto, Toyama, Japan, operated by West Japan Railway Company (JR West).

== Lines ==
Etchū-Yamada Station is a station on the Jōhana Line, and is located 27.5 kilometers from the end of the line at Takaoka.

== Layout ==
The station has a single side platform serving one bi-directional track. The station is staffed.

== Adjacent stations ==
«	Service	»
Jōhana Line
Fukumitsu	-	Jōhana

== History ==
The station opened on 10 August 1951. With the privatization of Japanese National Railways (JNR) on 1 April 1987, the station came under the control of JR West.

== Passenger statistics ==
In fiscal 2015, the station was used by an average of 39 passengers daily (boarding passengers only).

== Surrounding area ==
- Japan National Route 304

== See also ==
- List of railway stations in Japan
