= Toide Station =

Railway station in Takaoka, Toyama Prefecture, Japan

Toide Station 戸出駅
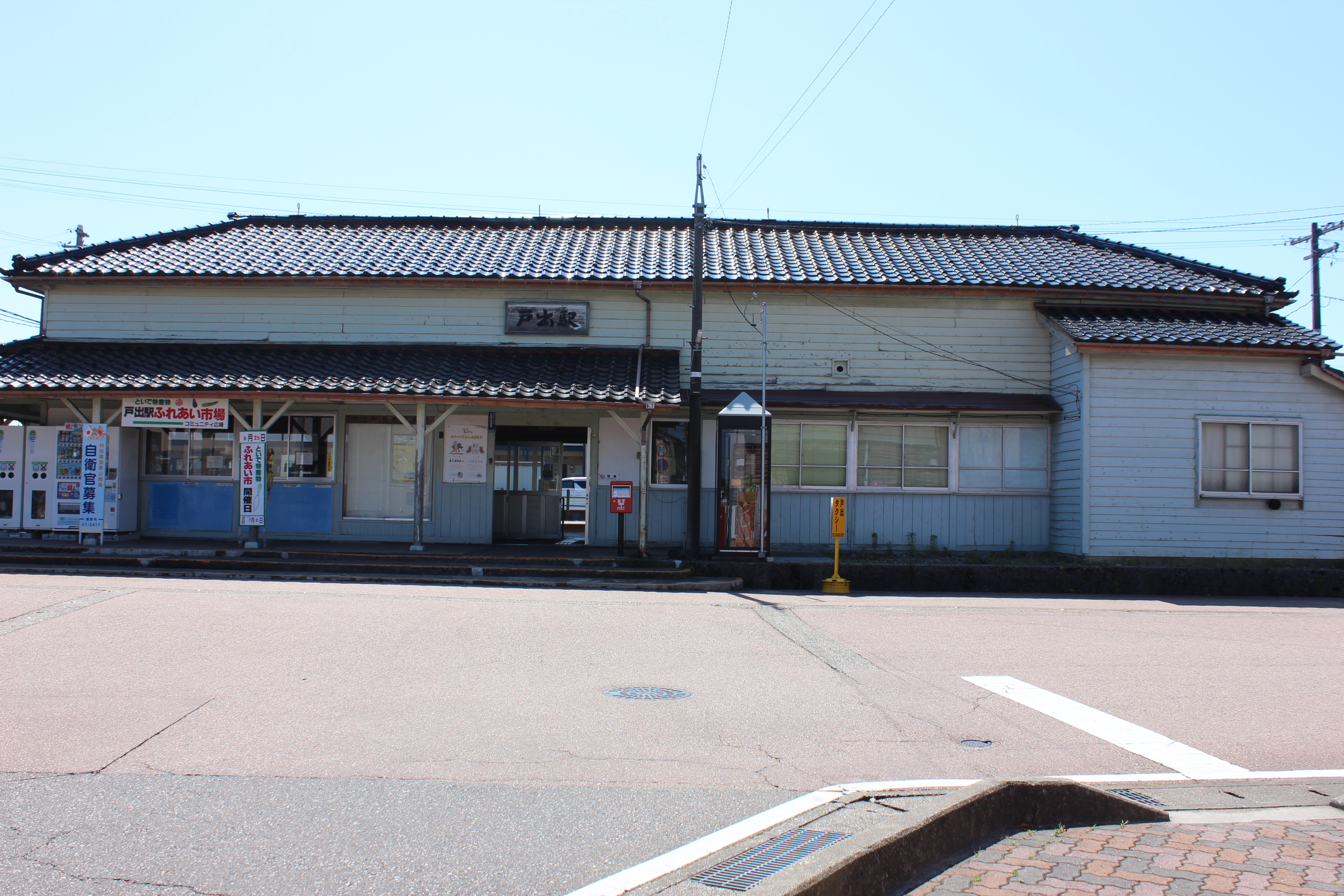
- Toide Station in June 2020

General information
- Location: 2-4-1 Toidemachi, Takaoka-shi, Toyama-ken 939-1104; Japan
- Coordinates: 36.6843°N 136.9841°E
- Operator: JR West
- Line: ■ Jōhana Line
- Distance: 7.3 km from Takaoka
- Platforms: 2 side platforms
- Tracks: 2

Construction
- Structure type: At grade

Other information
- Status: Unstaffed
- Website: Official website

History
- Opened: 4 May 1894; 132 years ago

Passengers
- FY2015: 870 daily
Location
- Location within Japan

Toide Station (戸出駅, Toide-eki) is a railway station on the Jōhana Line in city of Takaoka, Toyama, Japan, operated by West Japan Railway Company (JR West).

== Lines ==
Toide Station is a station on the Jōhana Line, and is located 7.3 kilometers from the end of the line at Takaoka.

== Layout ==
The station has two ground-level opposed side platforms serving two tracks, connected to the station building by a footbridge. The station is unattended.

=== Platforms ===
station side	■ Jōhana Line	for Takaoka
opposite side	■ Jōhana Line	for Jōhana

== Adjacent stations ==
«	Service	»
Jōhana Line
Hayashi	-	Aburaden

== History ==
The station opened on 4 May 1894. With the privatization of Japanese National Railways (JNR) on 1 April 1987, the station came under the control of JR West.

== Passenger statistics ==
In fiscal 2015, the station was used by an average of 870 passengers daily (boarding passengers only).

== Surrounding area ==
- Takaoka Minami High School
- Takaoka City Hall - Toide branch office

== See also ==
- List of railway stations in Japan
