= Higashi-Nojiri Station =

Railway station in Tonami, Toyama Prefecture, Japan

Coordinates: 36.6186°N 136.9437°E

Higashi-Nojiri Station 東野尻駅
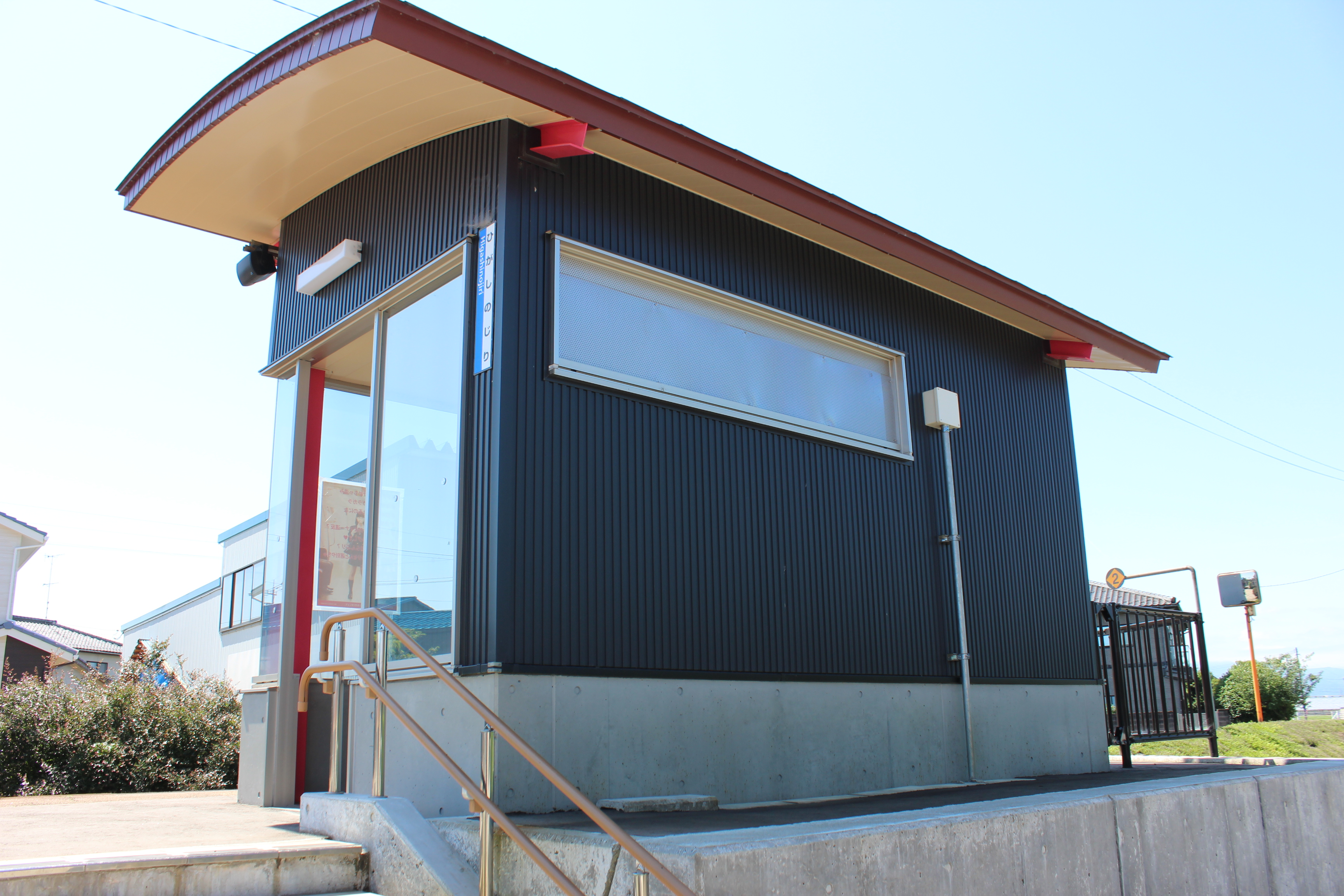
- New Waiting Room on the platform of Higashi-Nojiri Station in June 2020

General information
- Location: 4162 Noka, Tonami-shi, Toyama-ken 939-1333; Japan
- Operator: JR West
- Line: ■ Jōhana Line
- Distance: 15.5 km from Takaoka
- Platforms: 1 side platform
- Tracks: 1

Construction
- Structure type: At grade

Other information
- Status: Unstaffed
- Website: Official website

History
- Opened: 10 August 1951; 75 years ago

Passengers
- FY2015: 129 daily
Location
- Location within Japan

Higashi-Nojiri Station (東野尻駅, Higashi-Nojiri-eki) is a railway station on the Jōhana Line in city of Tonami, Toyama, Japan, operated by West Japan Railway Company (JR West).

== Lines ==
Higashi-Nojiri Station is a station on the Jōhana Line, and is located 15.5 kilometers from the end of the line at Takaoka.

== Layout ==
The station has a single side platform serving one bi-directional track. The station is staffed.

== Adjacent stations ==
«	Service	»
Jōhana Line
Tonami	-	Takagi

== History ==
The station opened on 10 August 1951. With the privatization of Japanese National Railways (JNR) on 1 April 1987, the station came under the control of JR West.

== Passenger statistics ==
In fiscal 2015, the station was used by an average of 129 passengers daily (boarding passengers only).

== Surrounding area ==
- Tonami Industrial High School

== See also ==
- List of railway stations in Japan
