= Jōhana Line =

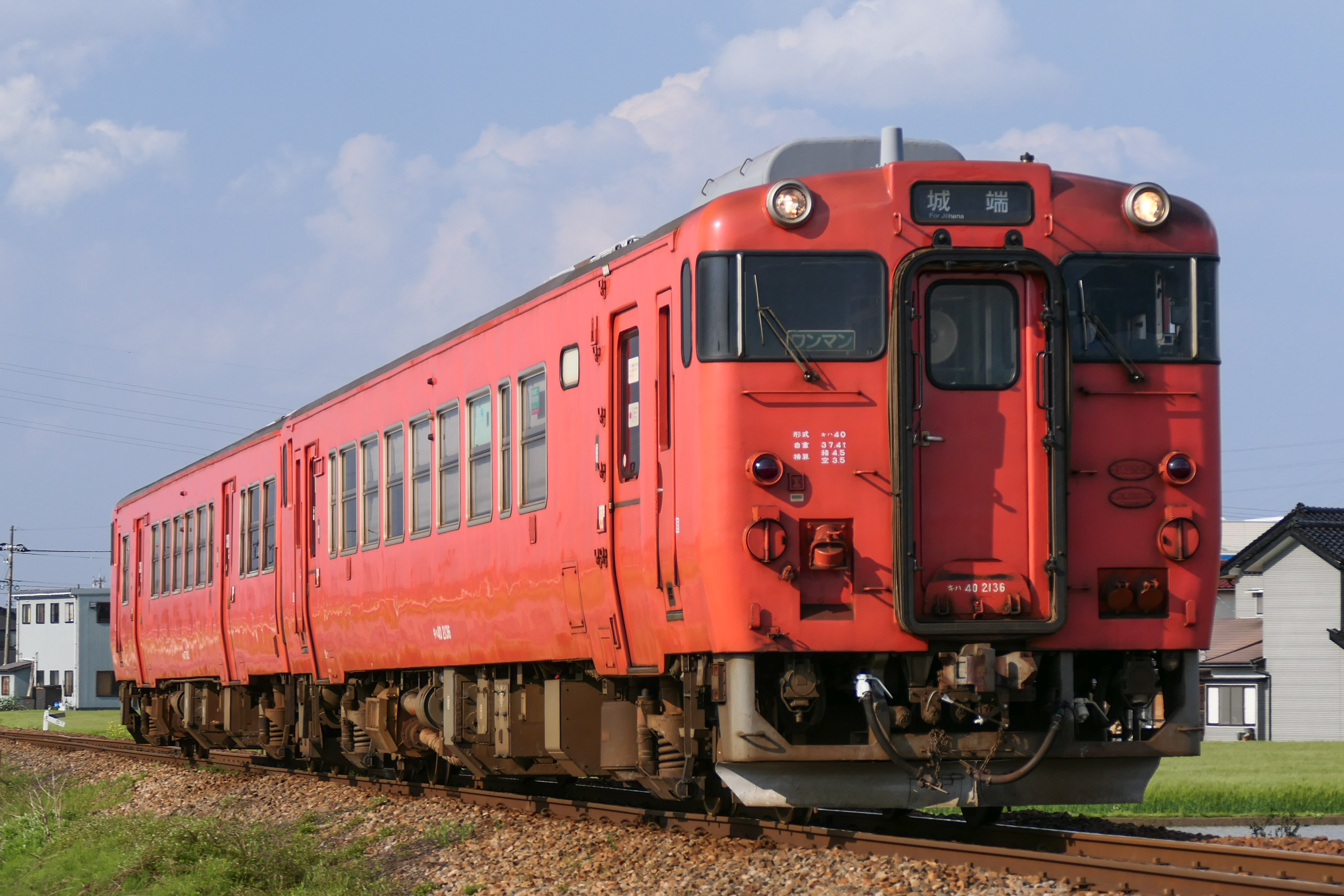
- Local train running on the Jōhana Line in May 2022

Overview
- Status: In operation
- Owner: JR West
- Locale: Toyama Prefecture
- Termini: Takaoka; Jōhana
- Stations: 14

Service
- Type: Regional rail
- Operator(s): JR West
- Rolling stock: KiHa 40 series DMU

History
- Opened: 1897; 128 years ago

Technical
- Line length: 29.9 km (18.6 mi)
- Number of tracks: Entire line single tracked
- Character: Rural
- Track gauge: 1,067 mm (3 ft 6 in)
- Electrification: None
- Operating speed: 85 km/h (53 mph)
Route map
Map

The Jōhana Line (城端線, Jōhana-sen) is a railway line operated by West Japan Railway Company (JR West) in Toyama Prefecture, Japan. It connects Takaoka with Johana.

== Route data ==
- Operating Company: West Japan Railway Company (Services and tracks)
- Distance: 29.9 km (18.6 mi)
- Track gauge: 1,067 mm (3 ft 6 in)
- Stations: 14
- Double-track: None
- Electrification: Not electrified
- Railway signalling: Special automatic occlusive (track circuit detection type)

== Stations ==
Name	Japanese	Between (km)	Distance (km)	Transfers	Location	
Takaoka	高岡	-	0.0	Himi Line, Ainokaze Toyama Railway Line, Manyosen	Takaoka	Toyama
Shin-Takaoka	新高岡	1.8	1.8	Hokuriku Shinkansen	Takaoka	Toyama
Futatsuka	二塚	1.5	3.3		Takaoka	Toyama
Hayashi	林	1.3	4.6		Takaoka	Toyama
Toide	戸出	2.7	7.3		Takaoka	Toyama
Aburaden	油田	3.4	10.7		Tonami	Toyama
Tonami	砺波	2.6	13.3		Tonami	Toyama
Higashi-Nojiri	東野尻	5.2	15.5		Tonami	Toyama
Takagi	高儀	1.5	17.0		Nanto	Toyama
Fukuno	福野	2.4	19.4		Nanto	Toyama
Higashi-Ishiguro	東石黒	2.6	22.0		Nanto	Toyama
Fukumitsu	福光	2.7	24.7		Nanto	Toyama
Etchū-Yamada	越中山田	2.8	27.5		Nanto	Toyama
Jōhana	城端	2.4	29.9		Nanto	Toyama

== History ==
The line was opened in 1897 by the Chūetsu Railway (中越鉄道) as the Chūetsu Line (中越線) between Fushiki (on the present-day Himi Line) and Jōhana via Takaoka. The line was nationalised on 1 September 1920. The Chūetsu Line was renamed the Jōhana Line from 1 August 1942 following the incorporation of the Fushiki to Takaoka section into the Himi Line.

CTC signalling was commissioned over the entire line in 1983.

From 1 April 1987, with the privatization of JNR, the Jōhana Line came under the control of West Japan Railway Company (JR West).

On 14 March 2015, Shin-Takaoka station opened on the line to coincide with the extension of the Hokuriku Shinkansen to Kanazawa Station.

=== Former connecting lines ===
- Fukuno Station: The Tonami Railway opened a 7 km line to Tsuzawa in 1915, including a connection to the Hokuriku Main Line at Isurugi. The company merged with the Kaetsu Railway in 1919, which extended the line 13 km to Shogawa-Cho in 1922. The entire line was closed on 16 September 1972.

== See also ==
- List of railway lines in Japan
