= Higashi-Ishiguro Station =

Railway station in Nanto, Toyama Prefecture, Japan

Higashi-Ishiguro Station 東石黒駅
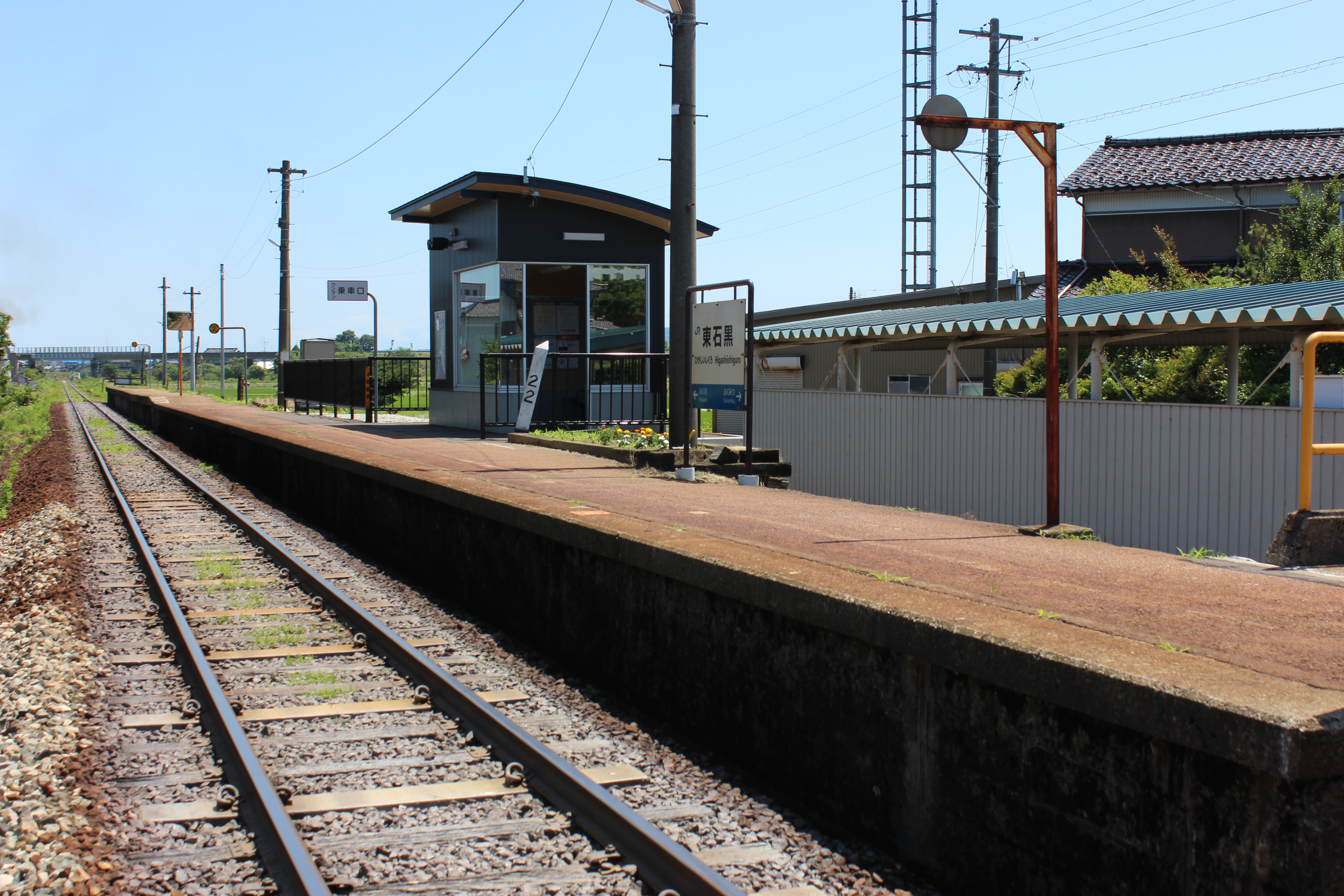
- New waiting room on the platform of Higashi-Ishiguro Station in June 2020

General information
- Location: 2683-2 Shimoyoshie, Nanto-shi, Toyama-ken 939-1543; Japan
- Coordinates: 36.5759°N 136.8983°E
- Operator: JR West
- Line: ■ Jōhana Line
- Distance: 22.0 km from Takaoka
- Platforms: 1 side platform
- Tracks: 1

Construction
- Structure type: At grade

Other information
- Status: Unstaffed
- Website: Official website

History
- Opened: 10 August 1951; 75 years ago

Passengers
- FY2015: 30 daily
Location
- Location within Japan

Higashi-Ishiguro Station (東石黒駅, Higashi-Ishiguro-eki) is a railway station on the Jōhana Line in city of Nanto, Toyama, Japan, operated by West Japan Railway Company (JR West).

== Lines ==
Higashi-Ishiguro Station is a station on the Jōhana Line, and is located 22.0 kilometers from the end of the line at Takaoka.

== Layout ==
The station has a single side platform serving one bi-directional track. The station is unattended.

== Adjacent stations ==
«	Service	»
Jōhana Line
Fukuno	-	Fukumitsu

== History ==
The station opened on 10 August 1951. With the privatization of Japanese National Railways (JNR) on 1 April 1987, the station came under the control of JR West.

== Passenger statistics ==
In fiscal 2015, the station was used by an average of 30 passengers daily (boarding passengers only).

== Surrounding area ==
- Higashi-Ishiguro Post Office

== See also ==
- List of railway stations in Japan
