= Japan National Route 306 =

Road in Japan

National Route 306
- 国道306号
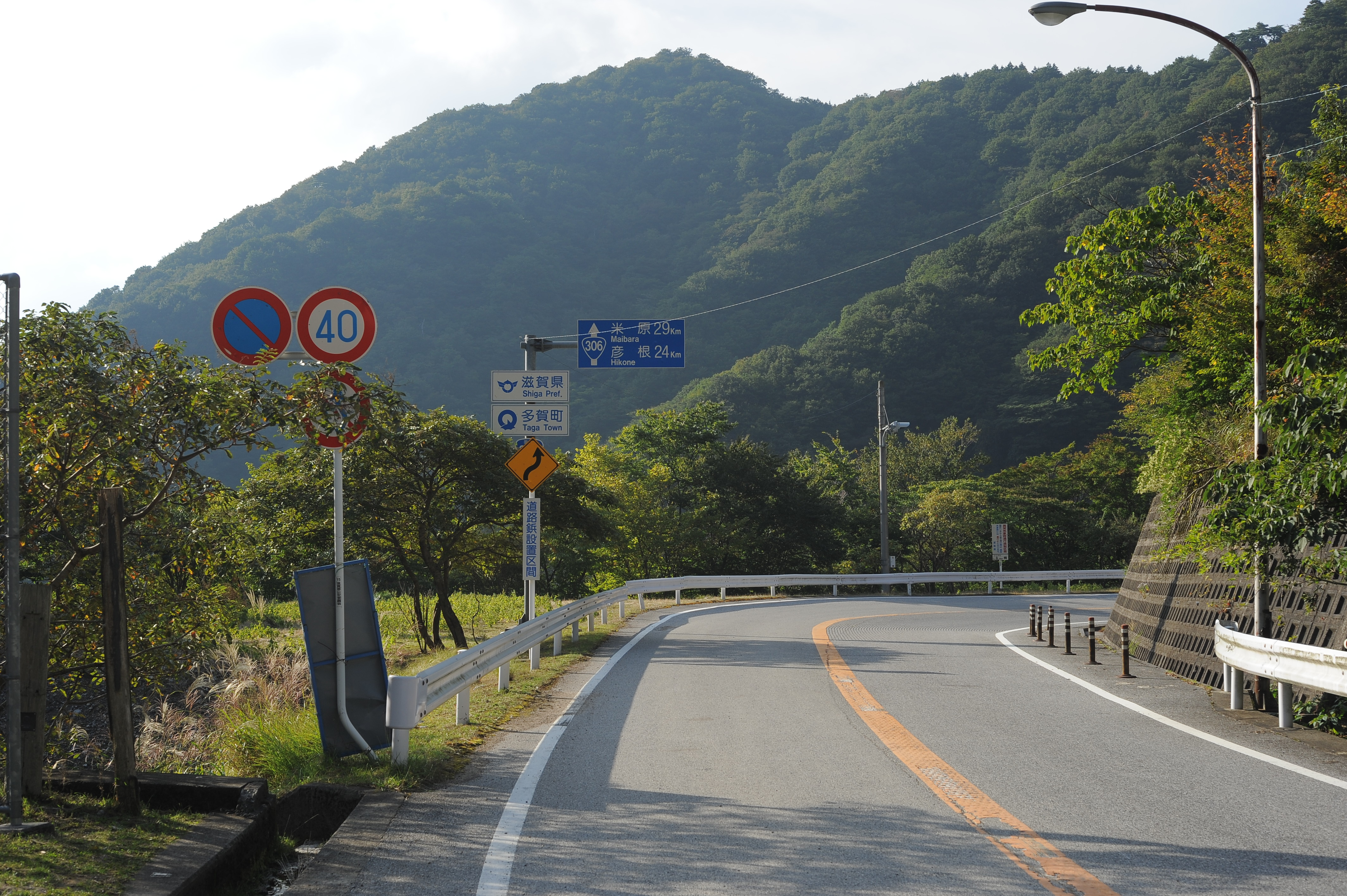

Route information
- Length: 89.9 km (55.9 mi)

Location
- Country: Japan

Highway system
- National highways of Japan; Expressways of Japan
← National Route 305	→ National Route 307

National Route 306 is a national highway of Japan connecting Tsu, Mie and Hikone, Shiga in Japan, with a total length of 89.9 km (55.86 mi).
