= Aburaden Station =

Railway station in Tonami, Toyama Prefecture, Japan

Aburaden Station 油田駅
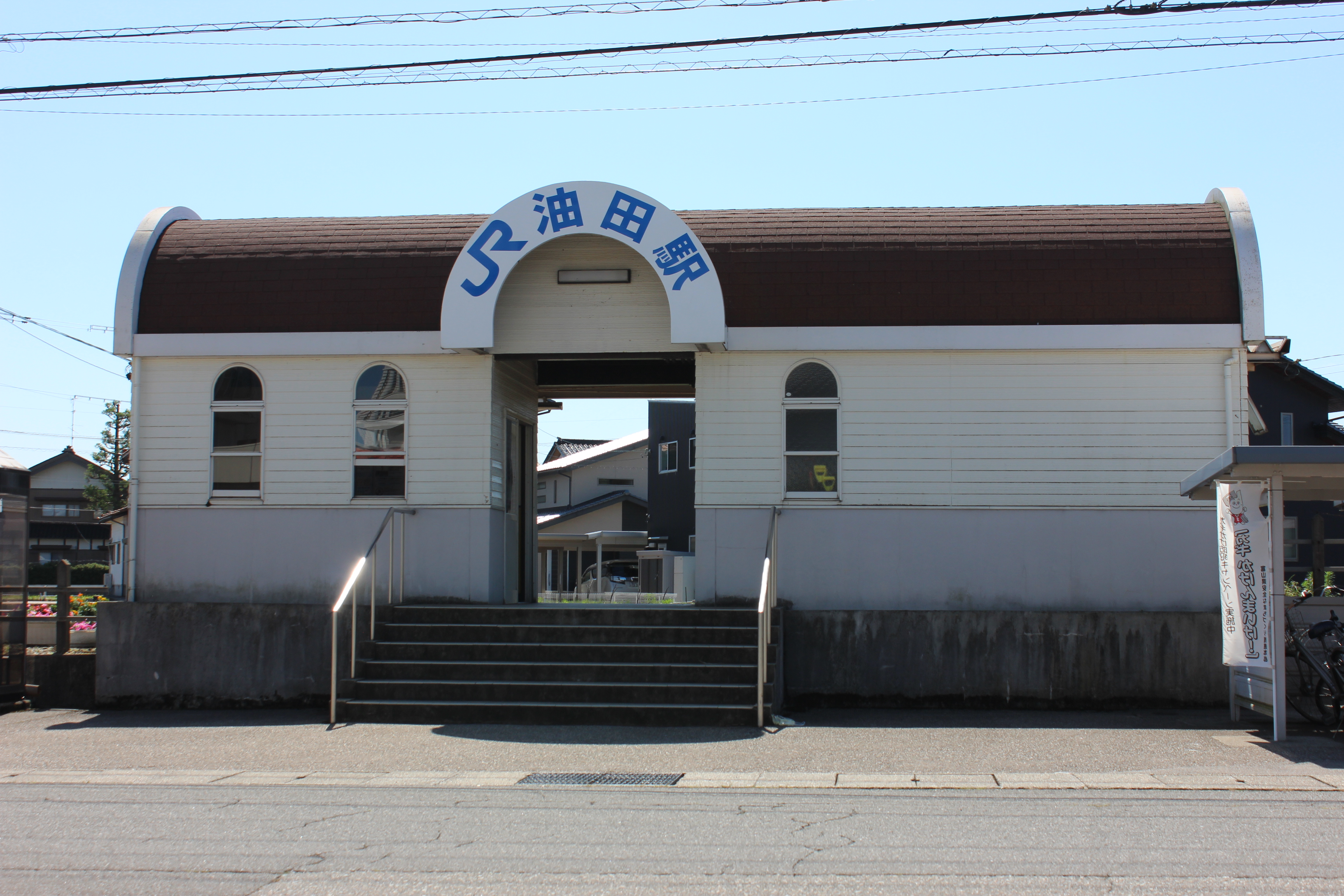
- Aburaden Station in June 2020

General information
- Location: Saburomaru, Tonami-shi, Toyama-ken 939-13; Japan
- Coordinates: 36.6549°N 136.9703°E
- Operator: JR West
- Line: ■ Jōhana Line
- Distance: 10.7 km from Takaoka
- Platforms: 1 side platform
- Tracks: 1

Construction
- Structure type: At grade

Other information
- Status: Unstaffed
- Website: Official website

History
- Opened: 29 December 1900; 125 years ago

Passengers
- FY2015: 293 daily
Location
- Location within Japan

Aburaden Station (油田駅, Aburaden-eki) is a railway station on the Jōhana Line in city of Tonami, Toyama, Japan, operated by West Japan Railway Company (JR West).

== Lines ==
Aburaden Station is a station on the Jōhana Line, and is located 10.7 kilometers from the end of the line at Takaoka.

== Layout ==
The station has a single side platform serving one bi-directional track. The station is unattended.

== Adjacent stations ==
«	Service	»
Jōhana Line
Toide	-	Tonami

== History ==
The station opened on 29 December 1900. With the privatization of Japanese National Railways (JNR) on 1 April 1987, the station came under the control of JR West.

== Passenger statistics ==
In fiscal 2015, the station was used by an average of 293 passengers daily (boarding passengers only).

== Surrounding area ==
- Aburaden Post Office
- Japan National Route 156

== See also ==
- List of railway stations in Japan
