= Japan National Route 303 =

Road in Japan

National Route 303
- 国道303号
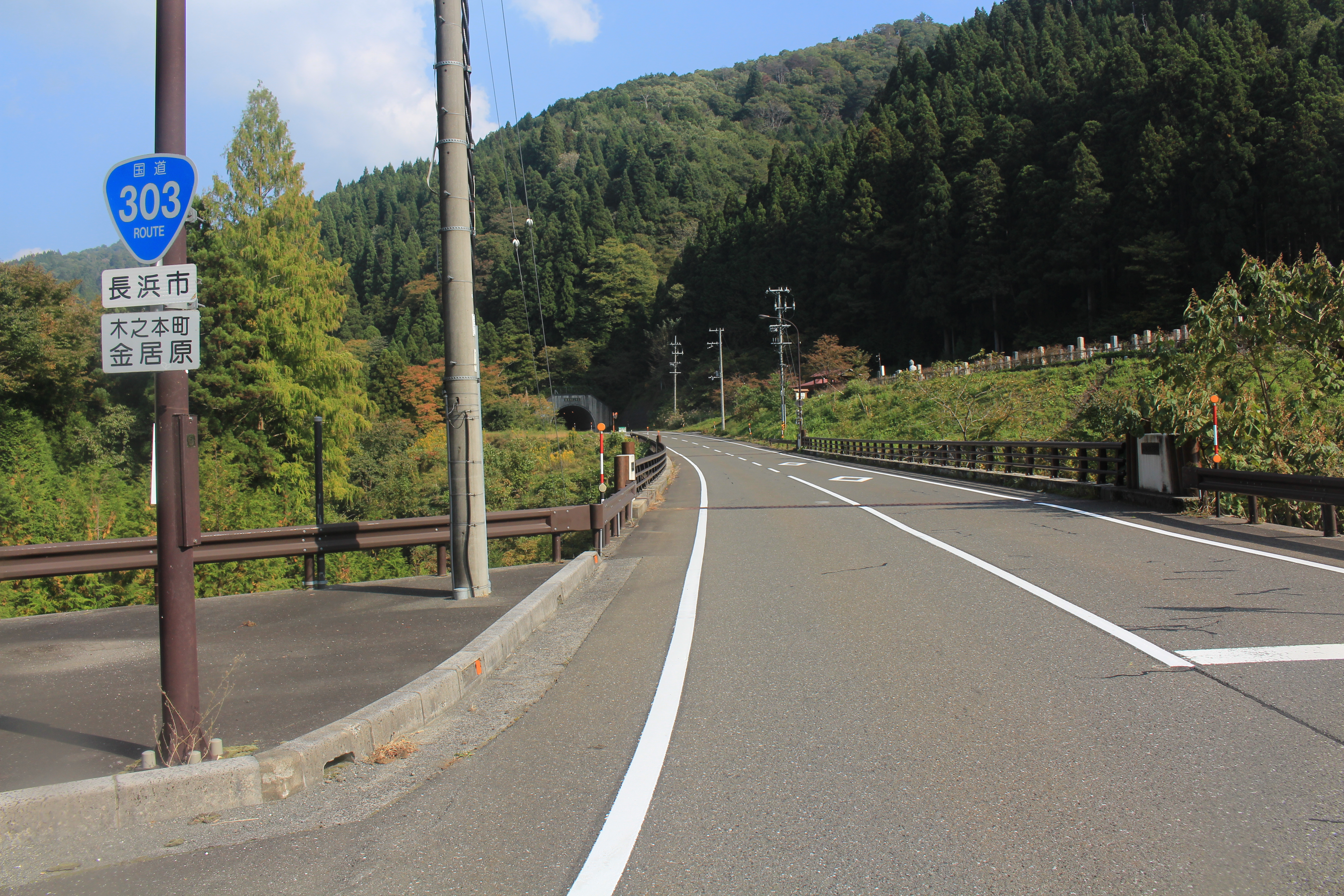

Route information
- Length: 126.2 km (78.4 mi)
- Existed: 1970–present

Major junctions
- From: Gifu

Location
- Country: Japan

Highway system
- National highways of Japan; Expressways of Japan
← National Route 302	→ National Route 304

National Route 303 is a national highway of Japan connecting Gifu, Gifu and Wakasa, Fukui in Japan. The highway has a total length of 122.8 km (76.3 mi).

== History ==
An incident occurred on 14 November 2018, when the Japan Ground Self-Defense Force was conducting a military exercise in Takashima, Shiga near Route 303. During the exercise, the JGSDF unintentionally hit the road with a live 81 mm mortar round. The resultant explosion caused fragments of pavement go flying, some of which struck a parked car with an elderly man inside. The man was not injured, but the car was damaged, with dents and some shattered windows.
