= Hayashi Station =

Railway station in Takaoka, Toyama Prefecture, Japan

Hayashi Station 林駅
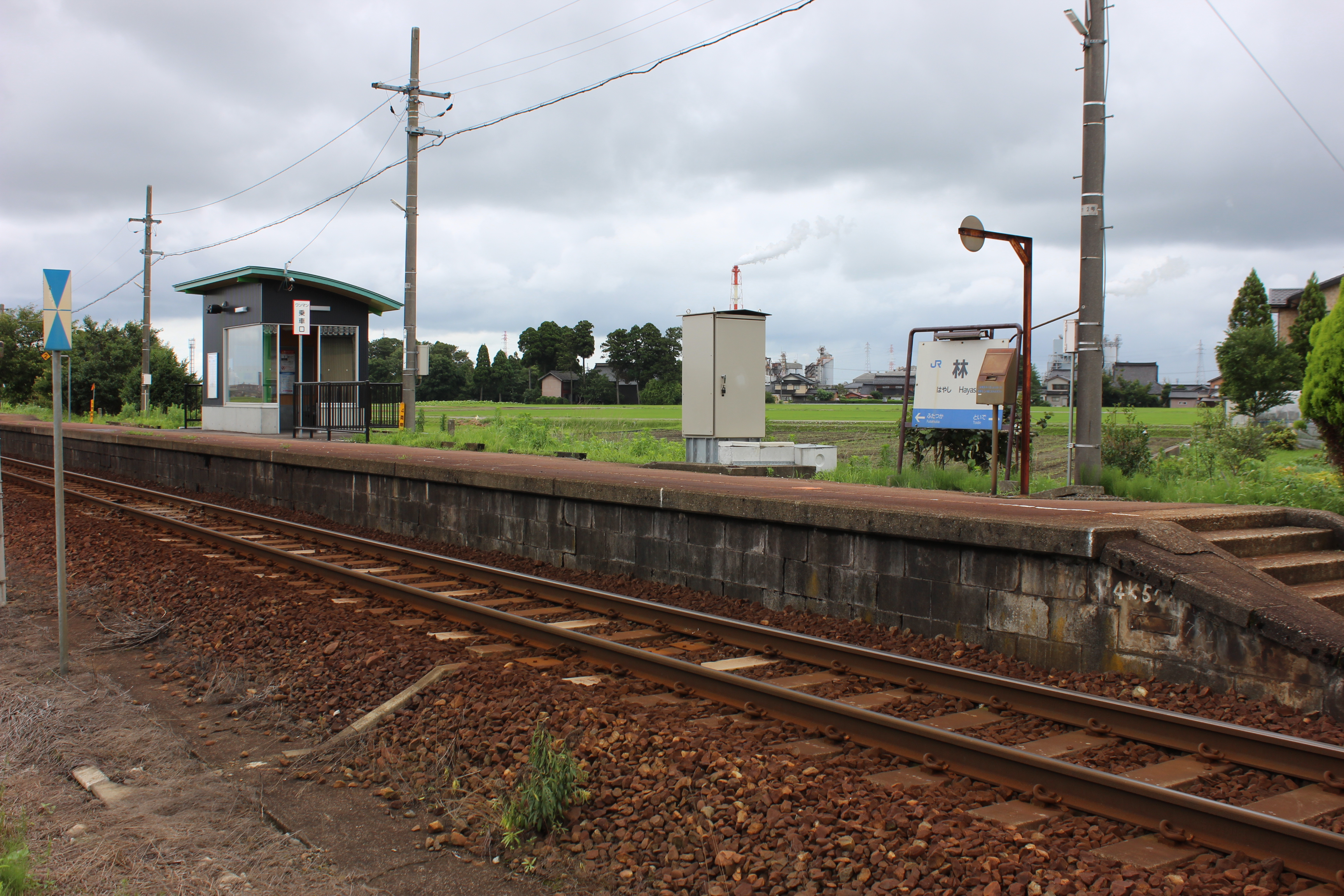
- A new waiting room on the Hayashi Station in July 2020

General information
- Location: 240 Higashitoheizo, Takaoka-shi, Toyama-ken 933-0817; Japan
- Coordinates: 36.7046°N 136.9991°E
- Operator: JR West
- Line: ■ Jōhana Line
- Distance: 4.6 km from Takaoka
- Platforms: 1 side platform
- Tracks: 1

Construction
- Structure type: At grade

Other information
- Status: Unstaffed
- Website: Official website

History
- Opened: 19 November 1956; 69 years ago

Passengers
- FY2015: 22 daily
Location
- Location within Japan

Hayashi Station (林駅, Hayashi-eki) is a railway station on the Jōhana Line in city of Takaoka, Toyama, Japan, operated by West Japan Railway Company (JR West).

== Lines ==
Hayashi Station is a station on the Jōhana Line, and is located 4.6 kilometers from the end of the line at Takaoka.

== Layout ==
The station has one ground-level side platform serving a single bidirectional track. The station is unattended.

== Adjacent stations ==
«	Service	»
Jōhana Line
Futatsuka	-	Toide

== History ==
The station opened on 19 November 1956. With the privatization of Japanese National Railways (JNR) on 1 April 1987, the station came under the control of JR West.

== Passenger statistics ==
In fiscal 2015, the station was used by an average of 22 passengers daily (boarding passengers only).

== Surrounding area ==
- Hakusan Jinja

== See also ==
- List of railway stations in Japan
