= Fukuno Station (Toyama) =

Railway station in Nanto, Toyama Prefecture, Japan

Fukuno Station 福野駅
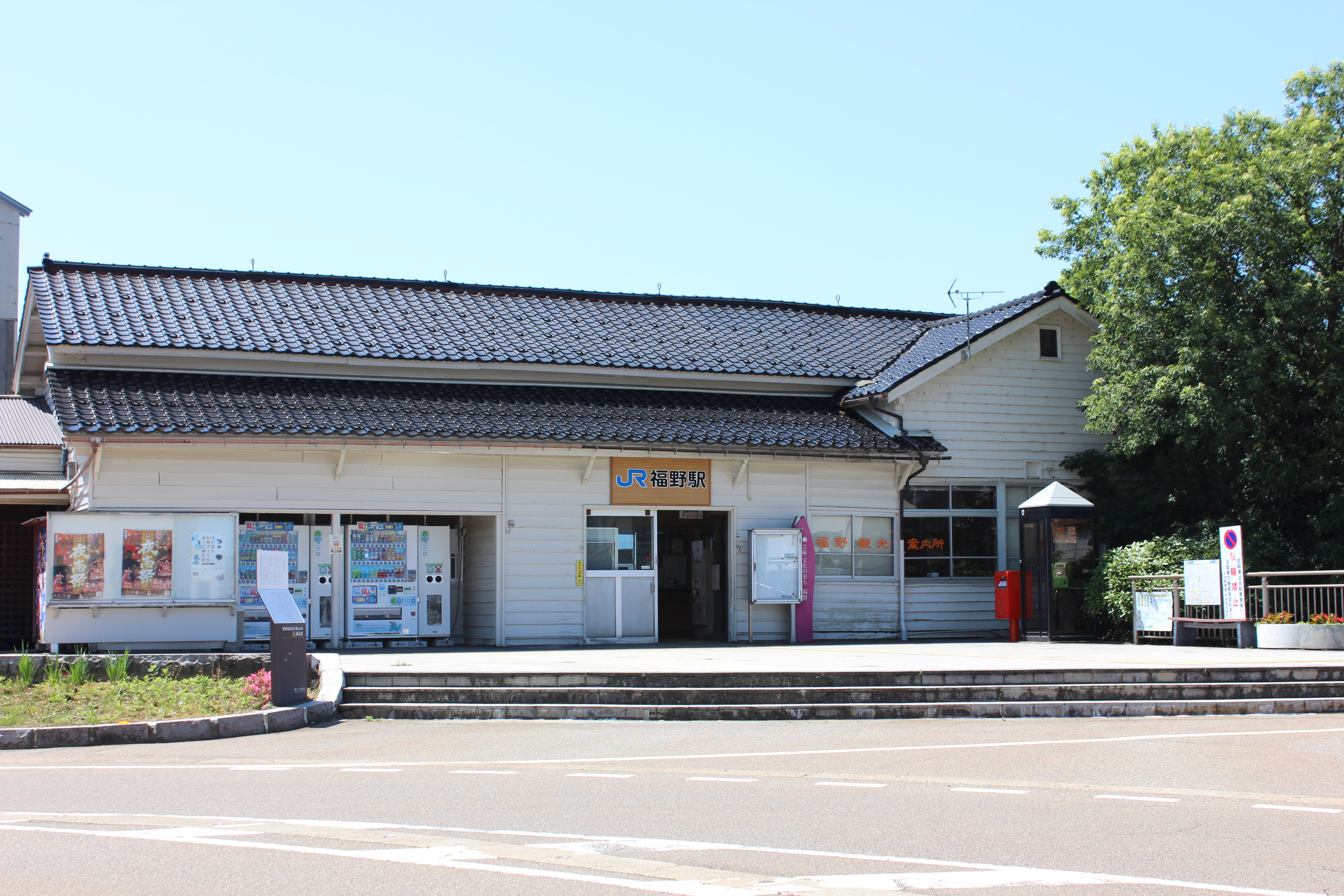
- Fukuno Station in June 2020

General information
- Location: 1767 Matsubarashin, Nanto-shi, Toyama-ken 939-1571; Japan
- Coordinates: 36°35′19″N 136°55′23″E
- Operator: JR West
- Line: ■ Jōhana Line
- Distance: 19.4 km from Takaoka
- Platforms: 2 side platforms
- Tracks: 2

Construction
- Structure type: At grade

Other information
- Status: Staffed (Midori no Madoguchi)
- Website: Official website

History
- Opened: 4 May 1897; 129 years ago

Passengers
- FY2015: 734 daily
Location
- Location within Japan

Fukuno Station (福野駅, Fukuno-eki) is a railway station on the Jōhana Line in city of Nanto, Toyama, Japan, operated by West Japan Railway Company (JR West).

== Lines ==
Fukuno Station is a station on the Jōhana Line, and is located 19.4 kilometers from the end of the line at Takaoka.

== Layout ==
The station has a two opposed ground-level side platforms serving one two tracks, connected to the wooden station building by a wooden footbridge. The station has a Midori no Madoguchi staffed ticket office.

=== Platforms ===
1	■ Jōhana Line	for Takaoka
2	■ Jōhana Line	for Jōhana

== Adjacent stations ==
«	Service	»
Jōhana Line
Takagi	-	Higashi-Ishiguro

== History ==
The station opened on 4 May 1897. With the privatization of Japanese National Railways (JNR) on 1 April 1987, the station came under the control of JR West.

== Passenger statistics ==
In fiscal 2015, the station was used by an average of 734 passengers daily (boarding passengers only).

== Surrounding area ==
- Nanto City Hall
- Fukuno Junior High School

== See also ==
- List of railway stations in Japan
