= Japan National Route 305 =

National highway in Japan

National Route 305
- 国道305号
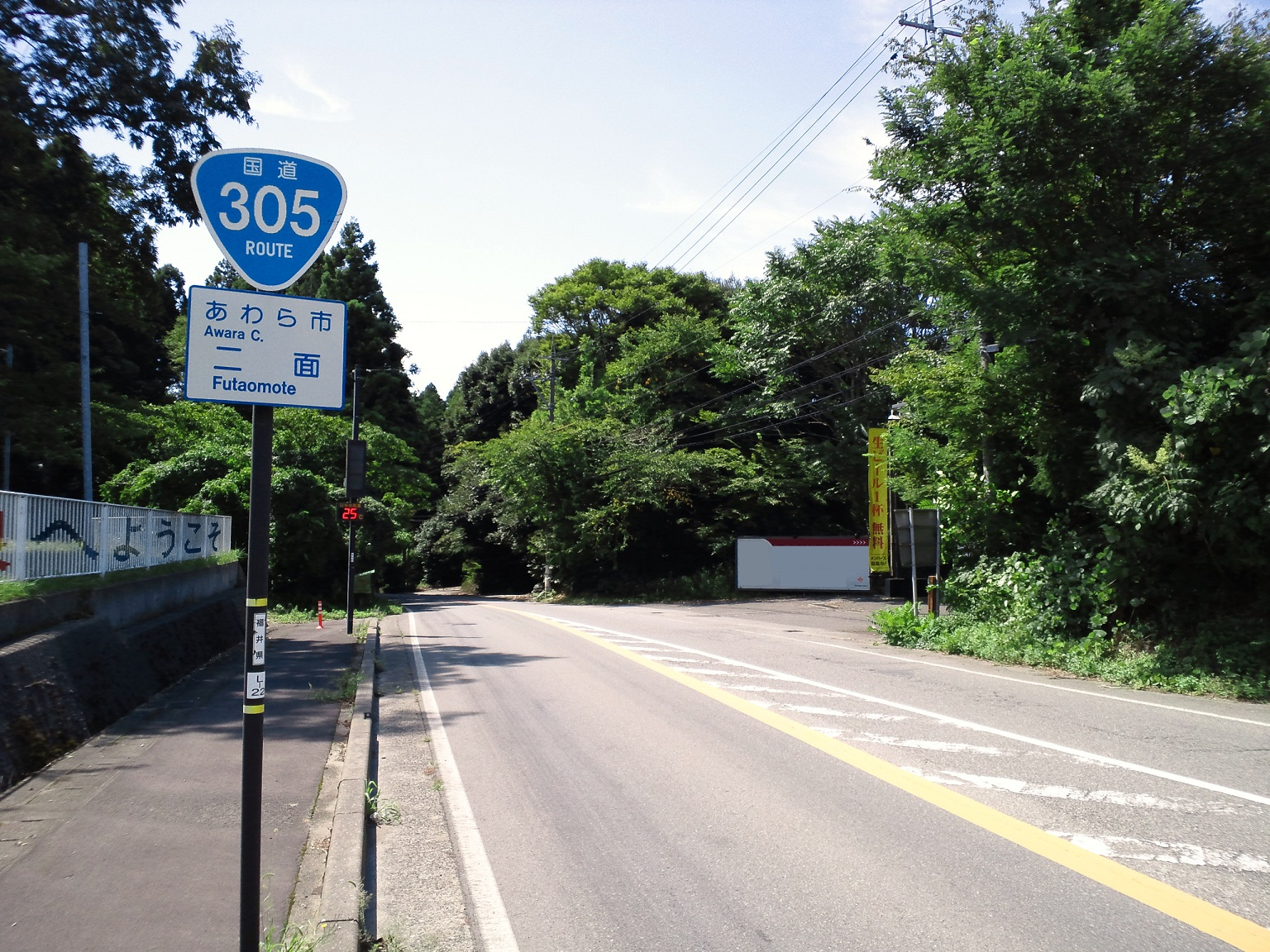

Route information
- Length: 145.5 km (90.4 mi)

Location
- Country: Japan

Highway system
- National highways of Japan; Expressways of Japan
← National Route 304	→ National Route 306

National Route 305 is a national highway of Japan. The highway connects Kanazawa, Ishikawa and Minamiechizen, Fukui. It has a total length of 145.5 kilometers (90.4 mi).

== Temporary detour ==
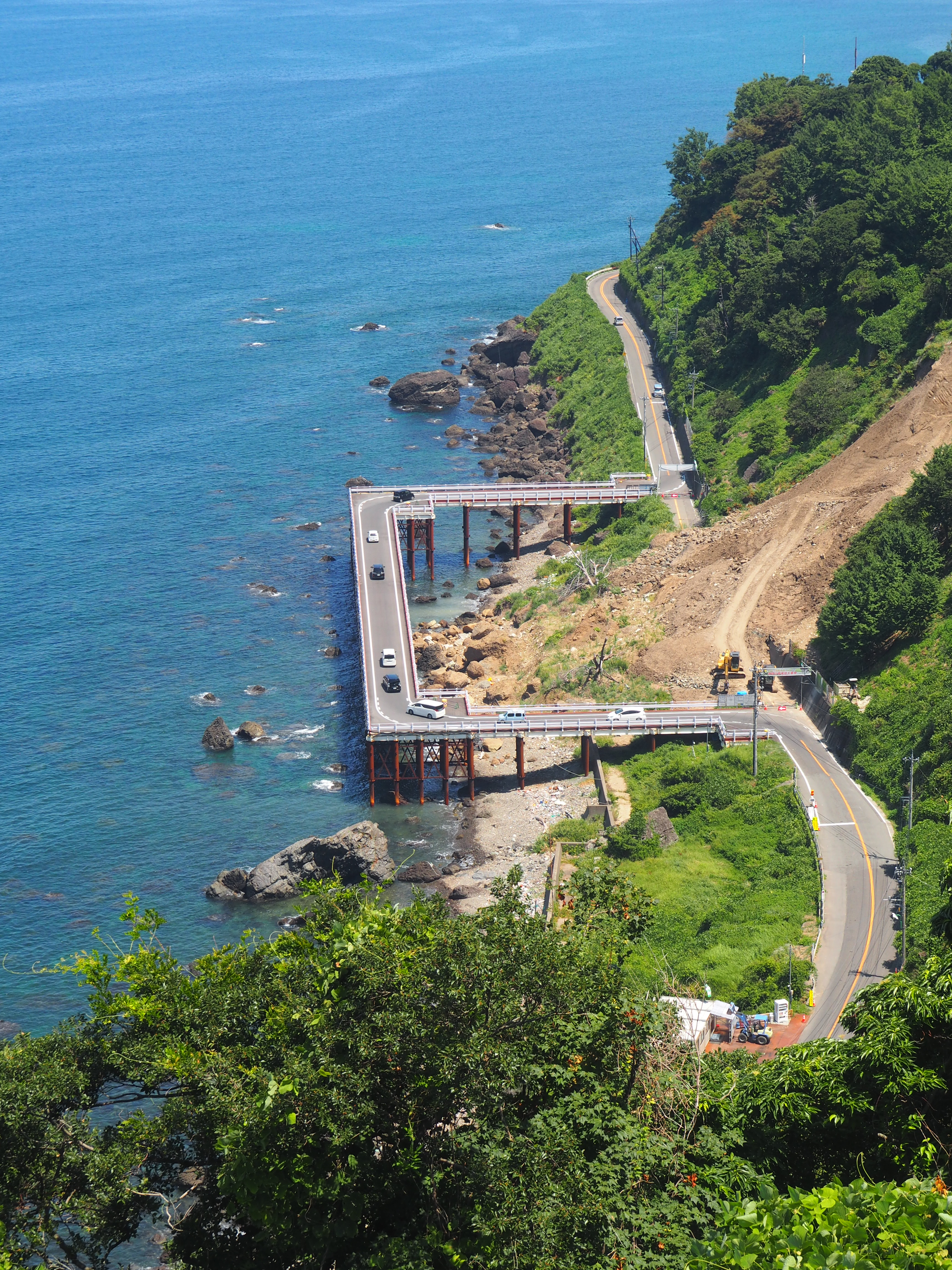
Landslide detour

In July 2018, a landslide in Fukui city closed the road, forcing local authorities to construct a temporary detour bridge, which was completed in October 2018.
