= Takagi Station (Toyama) =

Railway station in Nanto, Toyama Prefecture, Japan

Takagi Station 高儀駅
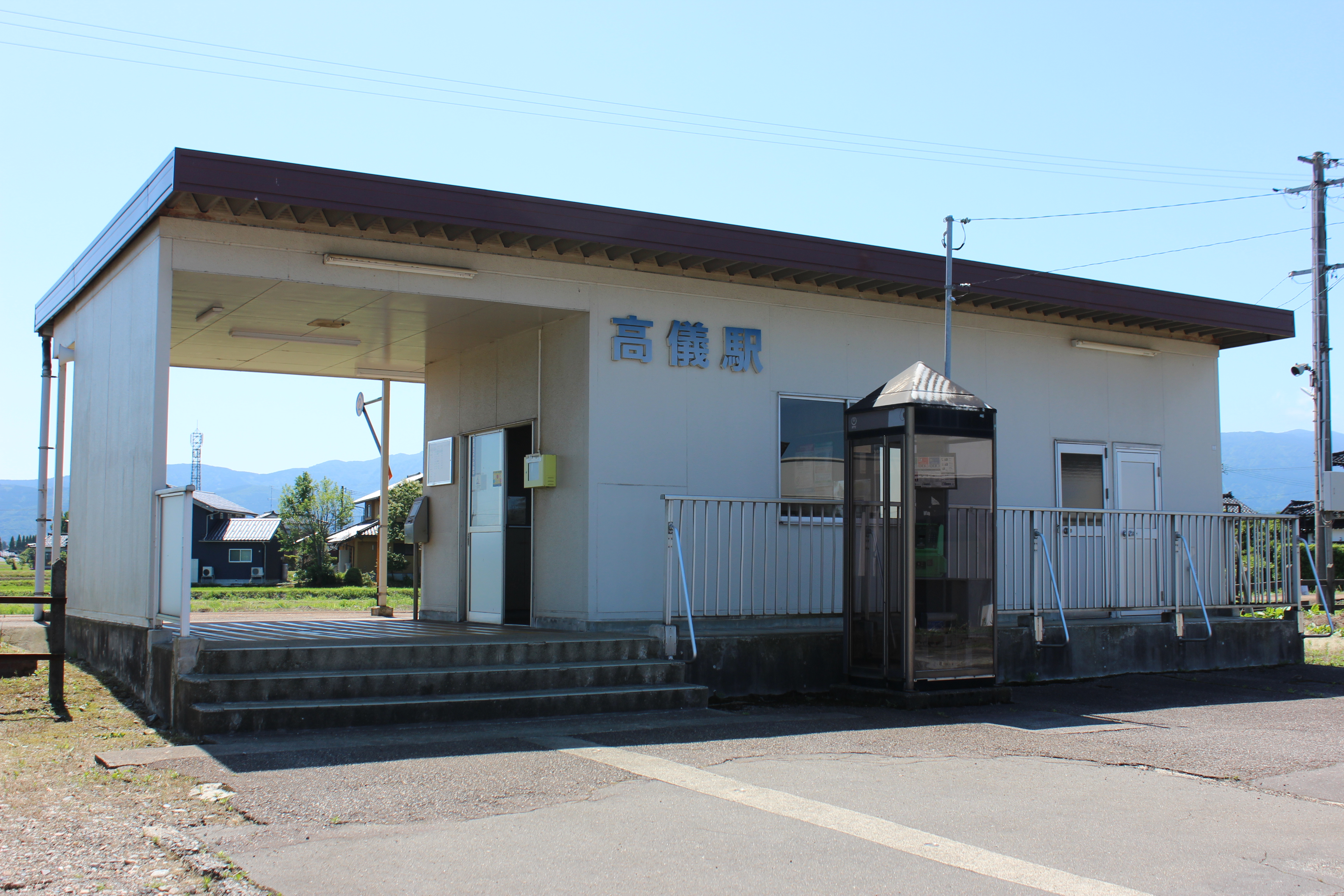
- Takagi Station in June 2020

General information
- Location: 879-2 Kawayokeshin, Nanto-shi, Toyama-ken 939-1504; Japan
- Coordinates: 36.6069°N 136.9362°E
- Operator: JR West
- Line: ■ Jōhana Line
- Distance: 17.0 km from Takaoka
- Platforms: 1 side platform
- Tracks: 1

Construction
- Structure type: At grade

Other information
- Status: Unstaffed
- Website: Official website

History
- Opened: 30 May 1899; 127 years ago

Passengers
- FY2015: 60 daily
Location
- Location within Japan

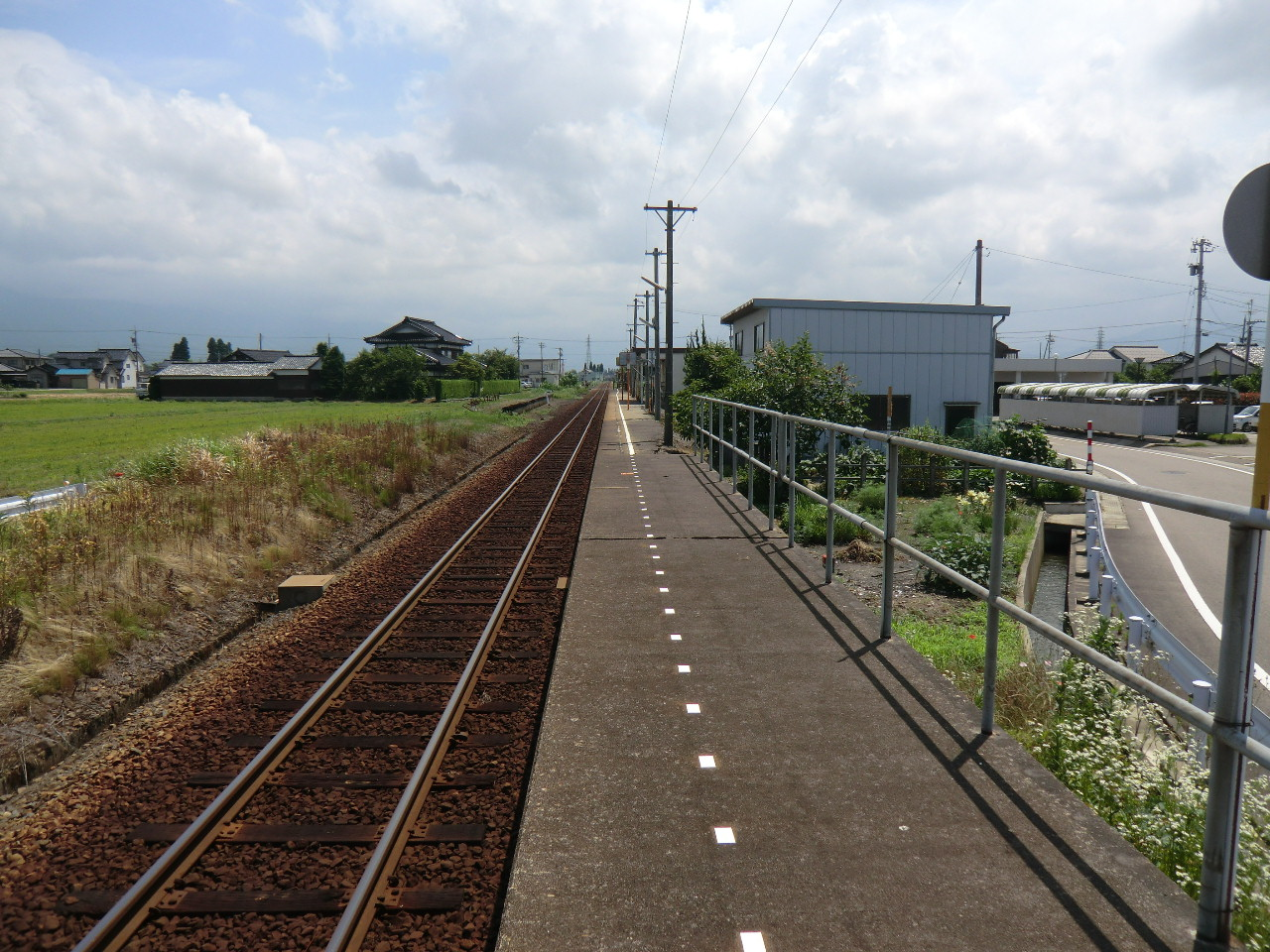
Takagi Station platform

Takagi Station (高儀駅, Takagi-eki) is a railway station on the Jōhana Line in city of Nanto, Toyama, Japan, operated by West Japan Railway Company (JR West).

== Lines ==
Takagi Station is a station on the Jōhana Line, and is located 17.0 kilometers from the end of the line at Takaoka.

== Layout ==
The station has a single side platform serving one bi-directional track. The station is unattended.

== Adjacent stations ==
«	Service	»
Jōhana Line
Higashi-Nojiri	-	Fukuno

== History ==
The station opened on 30 May 1899. With the privatization of Japanese National Railways (JNR) on 1 April 1987, the station came under the control of JR West.

== Passenger statistics ==
In fiscal 2015, the station was used by an average of 60 passengers daily (boarding passengers only).

== Surrounding area ==
The station is located in a rural area surrounded by farmland.

== See also ==
- List of railway stations in Japan
