= Tonami =

Tonami 砺波市
- City
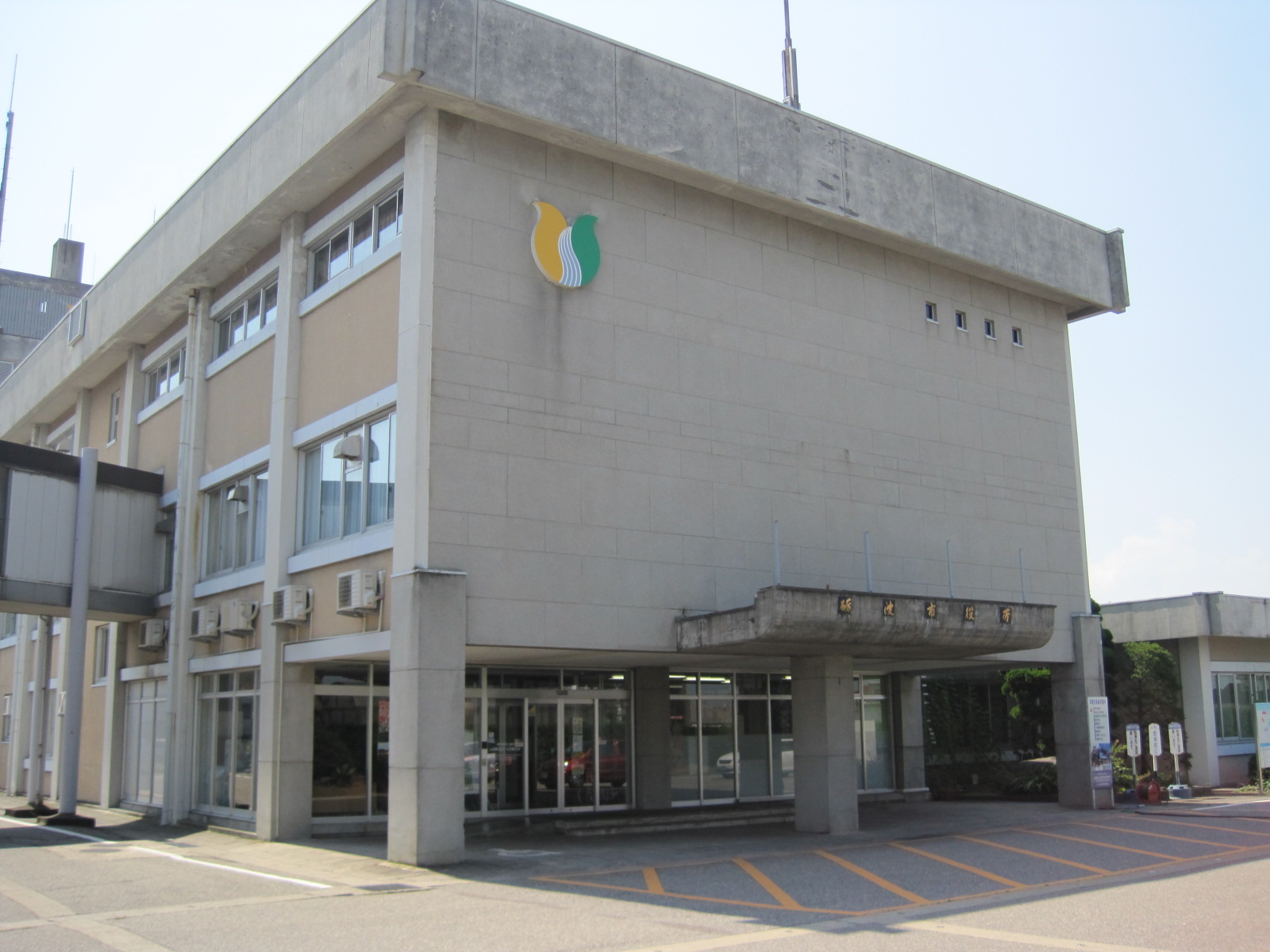
- Tonami City Hall

- Flag Seal

- Location of Tonami in Toyama Prefecture

- Coordinates: 36°38′51″N 136°57′44″E
- Country: Japan
- Region: Chūbu (Kōshin'etsu)
- Prefecture: Toyama

Government
  - - Mayor: Osamu Natsuno (since November 2012)

Area
  - Total: 127.03 km^{2} (49.05 sq mi)

Population (March 31, 2018)
  - Total: 48,659
  - Density: 383.05/km^{2} (992.10/sq mi)
- Time zone: UTC+9 (Japan Standard Time)
- Phone number: 0763-33-1111
- Address: 7-3 Sakae, Tonami-shi, Toyama-ken 939-1398
- Climate: Cfa
- Website: www.city.tonami.toyama.jp
- Symbols
- Bird: Brown-eared bulbul
- Flower: Tulip
- Tree: Cryptomeria

Tonami (砺波市, Tonami-shi) is a city in Toyama Prefecture, Japan. As of 31 March 2018, the city had an estimated population of 48,659 in 16,739 households and a population density of 384 persons per km^{2}. Its total area was 127.03 square kilometres (49.05 sq mi).

== Geography ==
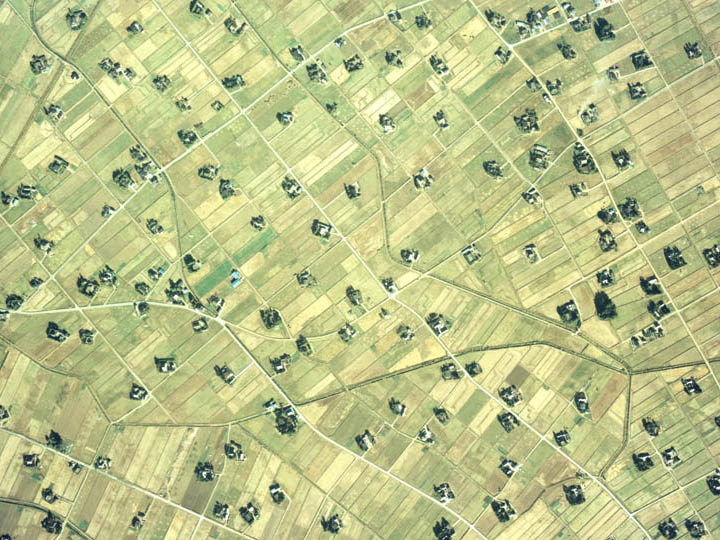
"dispersed settlements" (散居村, Sankyo-son) in Tonami

Tonami is located in the Tonami plains of western Toyama Prefecture. Much of the area is a dispersed settlement typical of this region of Japan.

=== Surrounding municipalities ===
- Toyama Prefecture
  - Imizu
  - Nanto
  - Oyabe
  - Takaoka
  - Toyama

=== Climate ===
Tonami has a humid subtropical climate (Köppen Cfa) characterized by mild summers and cold winters with heavy snowfall. The average annual temperature in Himi is 13.8 °C. The average annual rainfall is 2414 mm with September as the wettest month. The temperatures are highest on average in August, at around 26.4 °C, and lowest in January, at around 2.4 °C.

Climate data for Tonami (1991−2020 normals, extremes 1976−present)
Month	Jan	Feb	Mar	Apr	May	Jun	Jul	Aug	Sep	Oct	Nov	Dec	Year
Record high °C (°F)	18.9 (66.0)	20.8 (69.4)	27.0 (80.6)	30.2 (86.4)	32.2 (90.0)	34.9 (94.8)	36.2 (97.2)	38.8 (101.8)	35.9 (96.6)	33.9 (93.0)	27.8 (82.0)	23.6 (74.5)	38.8 (101.8)
Mean daily maximum °C (°F)	5.5 (41.9)	6.4 (43.5)	10.7 (51.3)	16.8 (62.2)	22.0 (71.6)	25.1 (77.2)	28.8 (83.8)	30.4 (86.7)	26.3 (79.3)	20.8 (69.4)	14.9 (58.8)	8.9 (48.0)	18.1 (64.5)
Daily mean °C (°F)	2.1 (35.8)	2.4 (36.3)	5.9 (42.6)	11.5 (52.7)	16.9 (62.4)	20.7 (69.3)	24.7 (76.5)	25.9 (78.6)	21.9 (71.4)	16.2 (61.2)	10.5 (50.9)	5.1 (41.2)	13.7 (56.6)
Mean daily minimum °C (°F)	−0.9 (30.4)	−1.2 (29.8)	1.5 (34.7)	6.4 (43.5)	12.4 (54.3)	17.2 (63.0)	21.4 (70.5)	22.2 (72.0)	18.2 (64.8)	12.2 (54.0)	6.5 (43.7)	1.6 (34.9)	9.8 (49.6)
Record low °C (°F)	−10.9 (12.4)	−12.0 (10.4)	−8.6 (16.5)	−1.6 (29.1)	4.1 (39.4)	9.8 (49.6)	14.7 (58.5)	14.5 (58.1)	9.3 (48.7)	1.3 (34.3)	−2.3 (27.9)	−11.8 (10.8)	−12.0 (10.4)
Average precipitation mm (inches)	239.7 (9.44)	151.5 (5.96)	143.1 (5.63)	115.8 (4.56)	110.0 (4.33)	167.7 (6.60)	227.7 (8.96)	201.1 (7.92)	214.0 (8.43)	168.2 (6.62)	220.2 (8.67)	269.3 (10.60)	2,228.2 (87.72)
Average snowfall cm (inches)	159 (63)	128 (50)	26 (10)	1 (0.4)	0 (0)	0 (0)	0 (0)	0 (0)	0 (0)	0 (0)	0 (0)	62 (24)	374 (147)
Average precipitation days (≥ 1.0 mm)	23.0	18.8	17.1	12.7	10.8	11.2	13.9	10.7	13.0	13.3	17.3	22.4	184.2
Average snowy days (≥ 3 cm)	14.0	12.1	3.0	0.1	0	0	0	0	0	0	0.1	5.7	35
Mean monthly sunshine hours	58.5	83.6	135.0	173.6	199.9	142.9	146.1	193.4	131.3	138.2	103.9	65.8	1,581.5
Source: Japan Meteorological Agency

== Demographics ==
Per Japanese census data, the population of Tonami has recently plateaued after a long period of growth.

Historical population
Year	Pop.	±%
1970	41,403	—
1980	43,530	+5.1%
1990	44,521	+2.3%
2000	48,092	+8.0%
2010	49,410	+2.7%
2020	48,154	−2.5%

== History ==
The area of present-day Tonami was part of ancient Etchū Province, and was part of the holdings of Kaga Domain under the Edo period Tokugawa shogunate. The town of Tonami was founded on April 1, 1952 by the merger of the town of Demachi with the villages of Gokaya, Aburaden, Shoge, Nakamura and Hayashi. The villages of Aoshima and Ogami joined two months later on June 1, 1952. The villages of Ota, Minamihannya, Higachi-Nojiri, Yanaze and Nishi-Tonami were annexed on January 15, 1954, followed by Sendan, Sendanyama, Hannya, and Higashi-Hannya on March 1. The expanded town of Tonami was raised to city status on April 1, 1954. On November 1, 2004, the town of Shōgawa (from Higashitonami District) was merged into Tonami.

== Government ==
Tonami has a mayor-council form of government with a directly elected mayor and a unicameral city legislature of 18 members.

== Education ==
Tonami has eight public elementary schools and four public junior high schools operated by the town government, and two public high schools operated by the Toyama Prefectural Board of Education.

== Transportation ==
=== Railway ===
- West Japan Railway Company (JR West) - Jōhana Line
  - Aburaden - Tonami - Higashi-Nojiri

=== Highway ===
- Hokuriku Expressway
- National Route 156
- National Route 359
- National Route 471

== International relations ==
- Lisse, Netherlands, sister city since April 21, 1992
- Panjin, Liaoning, China, friendship city since April 25, 1991
- Yalova, Turkey, friendship city since October 3, 1989

== Local attractions ==
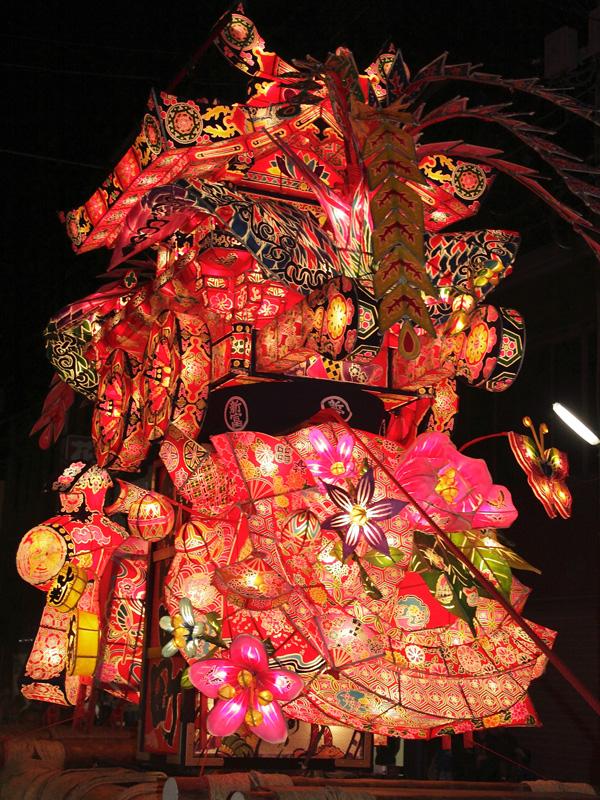
Tonami-yotaka festival held in June

- Masuyama Castle, ruins of a Sengoku period castle and National Historic Site. It was also known as Wada Castle (和田城, Wada-jō)
- Yotaka festival, held in June, with many parade floats which purposely collide during the festival, drawing large crowds to witness the spectacle. The Yotaka festival event originally began in the neighboring town of Fukuno. It features competitions between groups carrying mikoshi portable shrines. "Yoiyasa" is a traditional saying shouted by many during the event. When it is night, lamps using paper shades are lit. This festival is a prayer for a good harvest of the fields.
- There is a tulip park in Tonami, as well as a nationally recognized tulip festival that is held every year. There is a windmill transferred by the Netherlands, inscribed "DE VRIENDSCHAP" (friendship). The Tonami tulip festival has over 600 different kinds of tulips, and more than 2.5 million tulips in recent years.
