= Nanto, Toyama =

Nanto 南砺市
- City
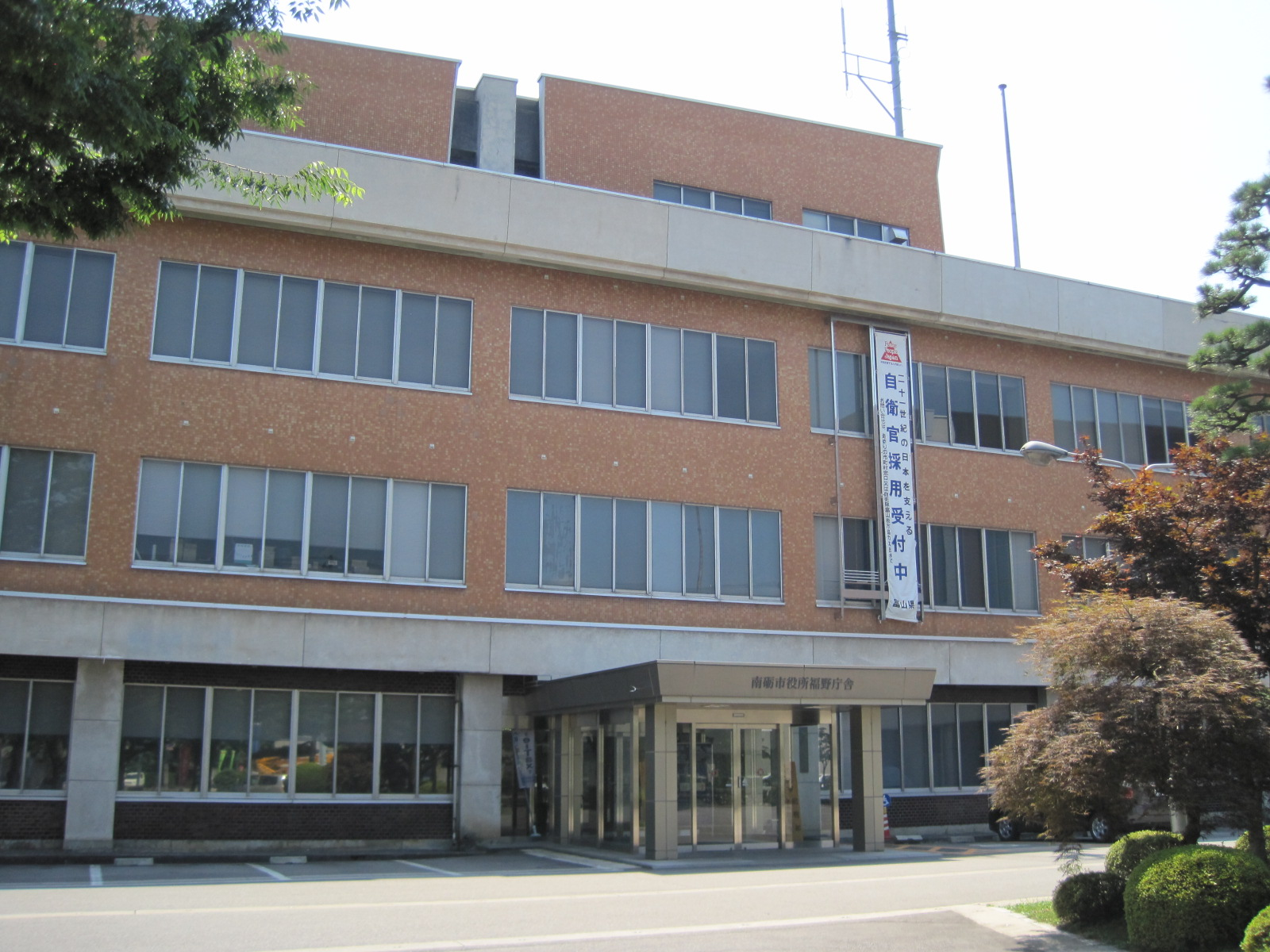
- Nanto City Hall

- Flag Seal

- Location of Nanto in Toyama Prefecture

- Coordinates: 36°35′16″N 136°55′9.8″E
- Country: Japan
- Region: Chūbu (Kōshin'etsu)
- Prefecture: Toyama

Government
  - Mayor: Mikio Tanaka

Area
  - Total: 668.64 km^{2} (258.16 sq mi)

Population (October 1, 2020)
  - Total: 47,976
  - Density: 71.76/km^{2} (185.9/sq mi)
- Time zone: UTC+09:00 (JST)
- Postal code: 939-1692
- Address: 1550 Araki, Nanto-shi, Toyama-ken
- Climate: Cfa
- Website: Official website

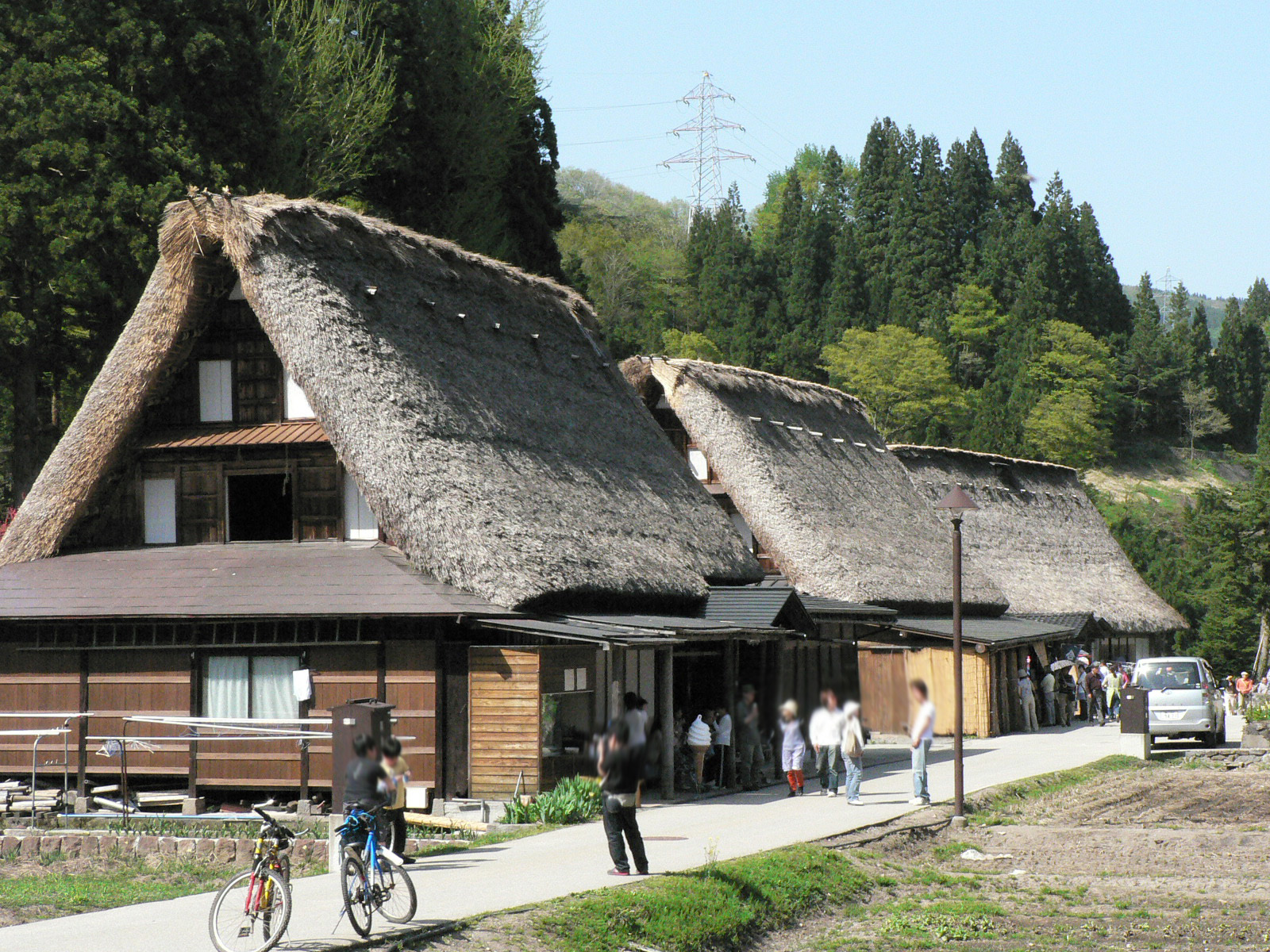
Traditional thatched-roofed homes in Ainokura, Gokayama

Nanto (南砺市, Nanto-shi) is a city in Toyama Prefecture, Japan. It is in a mountainous area in the south-west corner of the prefecture just north of Gifu Prefecture. It is home to the Gokayama UNESCO World Heritage site. As of 28 February 2018, the city had an estimated population of 51,669 in 17,761 households and a population density of 75.8 persons per km^{2}. Its total area is 668.64 square kilometres (258.16 sq mi).

== Geography ==
Nanto is located in the southwestern Toyama Prefecture, and is bordered by Ishikawa Prefecture to the west and Gifu Prefecture to the south. The northern part of the city is within the Tochi plains, and the southern portion of the city is mountainous. Much of the area is a dispersed settlement typical of this region of Japan. The different regions of Nanto consist of Fukuno, Fukumitsu, Johana, Inokuchi, and Inami.

=== Surrounding municipalities ===
- Gifu Prefecture
  - Hida
  - Shirakawa
- Ishikawa Prefecture
  - Kanazawa
  - Hakusan
- Toyama Prefecture
  - Oyabe
  - Tonami
  - Toyama

=== Climate ===
Nanto has a humid subtropical climate (Köppen Cfa) characterized by mild summers and cold winters with heavy snowfall. The average annual temperature in Nanto is 13.6 °C. The average annual rainfall is 2410 mm with September as the wettest month. The temperatures are highest on average in August, at around 26.3 °C, and lowest in January, at around 2.0 °C.

Climate data for Nanto (1991−2020 normals, extremes 1978−present)
Month	Jan	Feb	Mar	Apr	May	Jun	Jul	Aug	Sep	Oct	Nov	Dec	Year
Record high °C (°F)	19.3 (66.7)	21.1 (70.0)	26.7 (80.1)	31.2 (88.2)	32.2 (90.0)	33.3 (91.9)	36.0 (96.8)	38.6 (101.5)	36.9 (98.4)	34.3 (93.7)	27.2 (81.0)	24.4 (75.9)	38.6 (101.5)
Mean daily maximum °C (°F)	5.6 (42.1)	6.3 (43.3)	10.7 (51.3)	17.0 (62.6)	22.2 (72.0)	25.2 (77.4)	29.0 (84.2)	30.5 (86.9)	26.4 (79.5)	20.9 (69.6)	15.0 (59.0)	9.0 (48.2)	18.2 (64.7)
Daily mean °C (°F)	1.9 (35.4)	2.0 (35.6)	5.6 (42.1)	11.3 (52.3)	16.9 (62.4)	20.7 (69.3)	24.6 (76.3)	25.6 (78.1)	21.6 (70.9)	15.8 (60.4)	10.1 (50.2)	4.8 (40.6)	13.4 (56.1)
Mean daily minimum °C (°F)	−1.4 (29.5)	−1.8 (28.8)	0.9 (33.6)	5.9 (42.6)	12.0 (53.6)	16.8 (62.2)	21.0 (69.8)	21.6 (70.9)	17.7 (63.9)	11.5 (52.7)	5.7 (42.3)	1.1 (34.0)	9.3 (48.7)
Record low °C (°F)	−12.1 (10.2)	−12.1 (10.2)	−7.2 (19.0)	−2.7 (27.1)	3.7 (38.7)	9.0 (48.2)	13.9 (57.0)	13.9 (57.0)	7.2 (45.0)	1.3 (34.3)	−3.0 (26.6)	−9.9 (14.2)	−12.1 (10.2)
Average precipitation mm (inches)	321.9 (12.67)	204.8 (8.06)	180.3 (7.10)	135.7 (5.34)	117.5 (4.63)	182.6 (7.19)	231.6 (9.12)	203.5 (8.01)	221.7 (8.73)	184.4 (7.26)	261.7 (10.30)	351.9 (13.85)	2,597.3 (102.26)
Average precipitation days (≥ 1.0 mm)	23.7	19.1	18.2	13.1	11.4	11.6	14.4	11.0	13.6	13.6	17.5	22.8	190
Mean monthly sunshine hours	52.9	74.2	125.6	172.2	193.1	133.9	132.6	175.5	122.6	129.5	100.1	62.4	1,474.5
Source: Japan Meteorological Agency

== Demographics ==
Per Japanese census data, the population of Nanto has declined over the past 60 years.

Historical population
Year	Pop.	±%
1960	76,908	—
1970	68,979	−10.3%
1980	66,844	−3.1%
1990	65,113	−2.6%
2000	60,182	−7.6%
2010	54,724	−9.1%
2020	47,937	−12.4%

== History ==
The area of present-day Nanto was part of ancient Etchū Province.

The modern city of Nanto was established on November 1, 2004, from the merger of the towns of Fukuno, Inami and Jōhana, the villages of Inokuchi, Kamitaira, Taira and Toga (all from Higashitonami District), and the town of Fukumitsu (from Nishitonami District).

== Government ==
Nanto has a mayor-council form of government with a directly elected mayor and a unicameral city legislature of 20 members.

The current mayor is Mikio Tanaka who is currently serving his second term after initially being elected on November 16, 2008.

== Industry ==
Nanto is home to the P.A. Works animation studio, which is responsible for making shows like Canaan, Angel Beats!, Charlotte, and Sakura Quest. Nanto is also the location of the headquarters of KAWADA Technologies Inc. as well as a head office of the Daiken Corporation. Nanto is also well known for the Inami woodcarving town, which is believed to have been practicing the craft since 1390 C.E.

== Places of interest ==
=== Gokayama ===
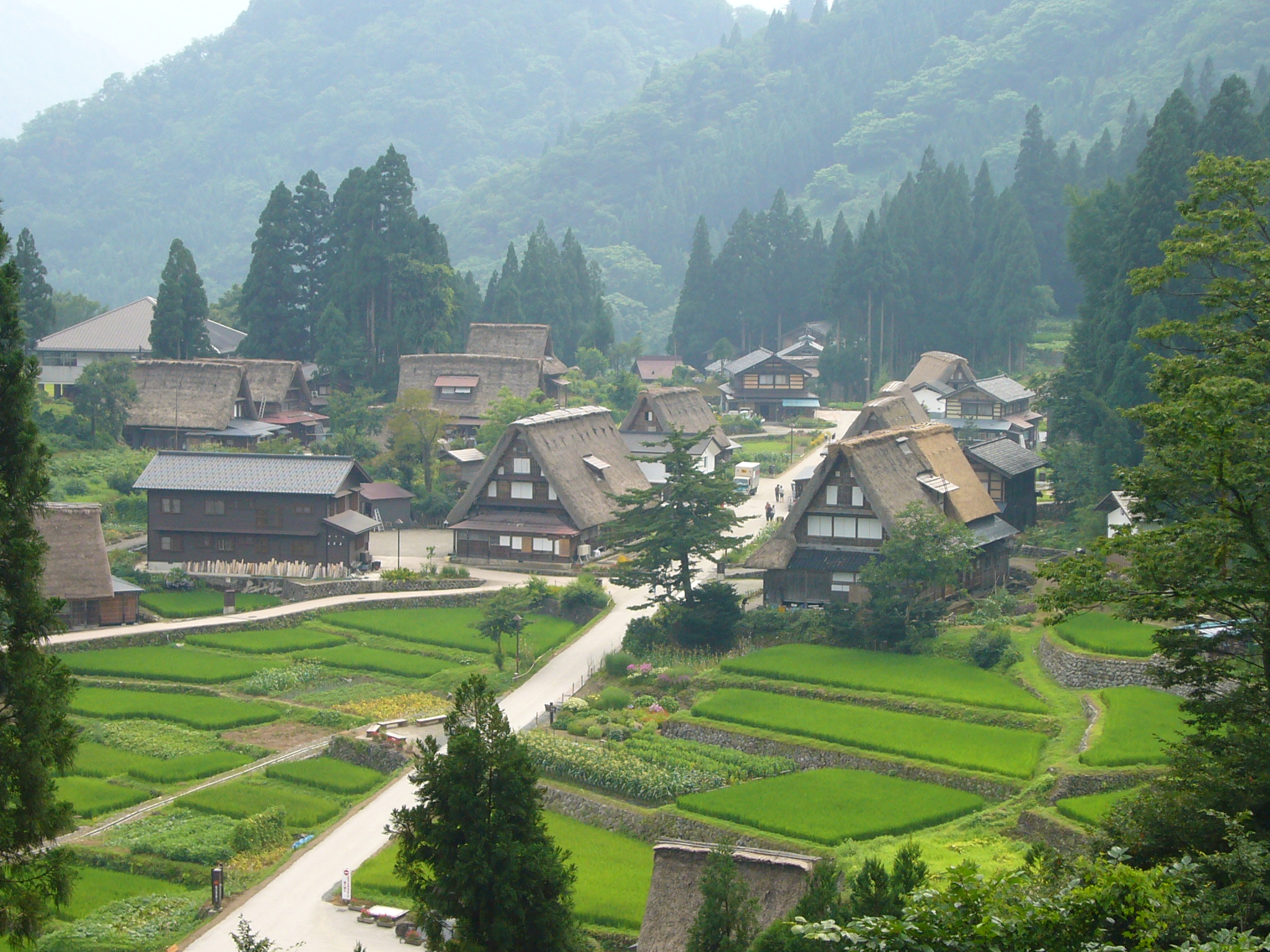
Traditional thatched-roofed homes in Ainokura, Gokayama

Gokayama is an area in Nanto that is a part of the UNESCO World Heritage List thanks to its traditional gassho built houses, which preserve a traditional architectural style that has a steep steeple shape to cope with the 2 to 3 meters of snow buildup the area gets in the winter. The village holds considerable history with some of the structures being dated back to the Nara Period (710 C.E.). Activities in the area in include participating in weaving and dyeing fabrics as well as making buckwheat (soba) noodles.

=== Inami Woodcarving Town ===
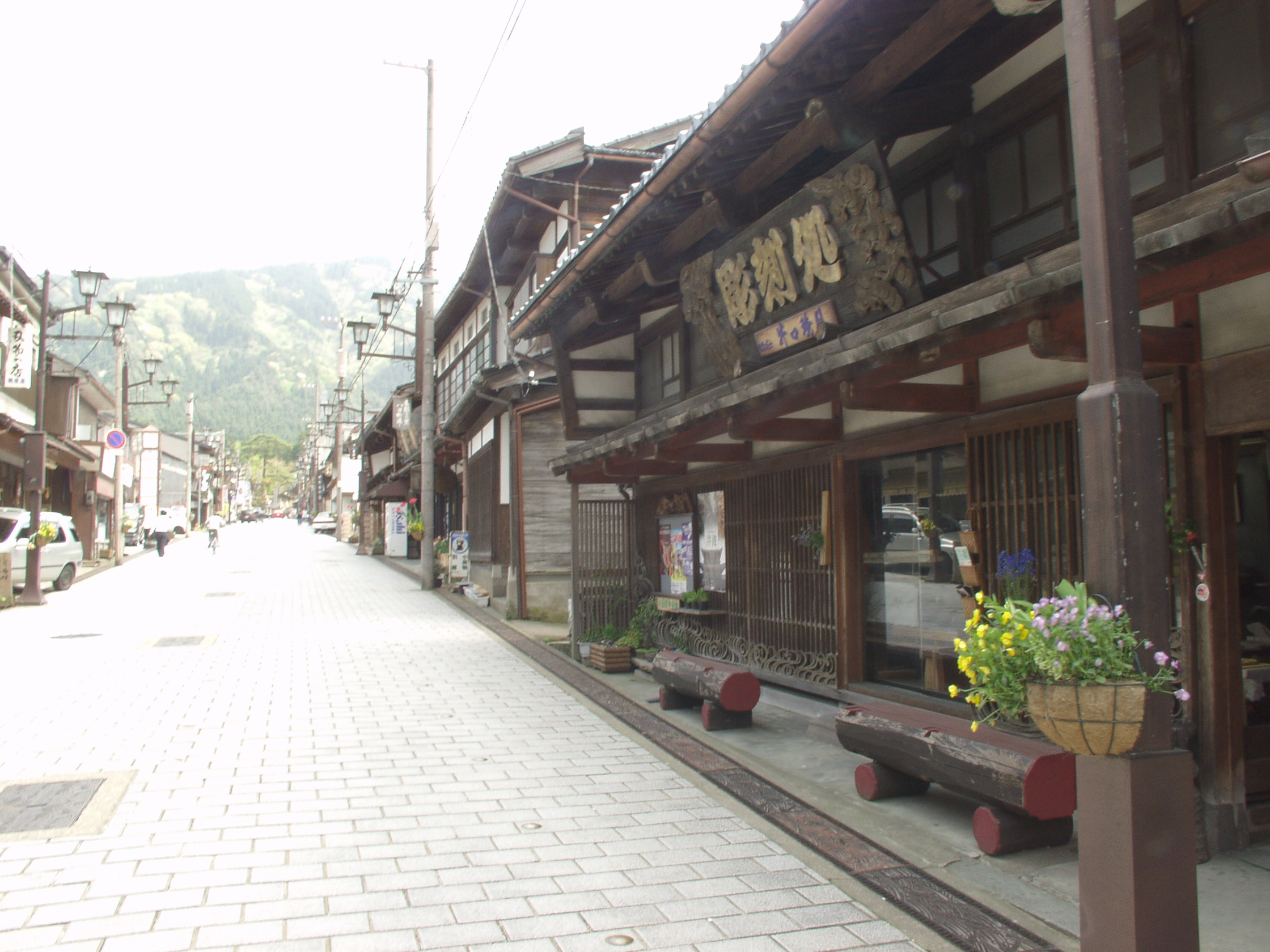
Inami town old street.

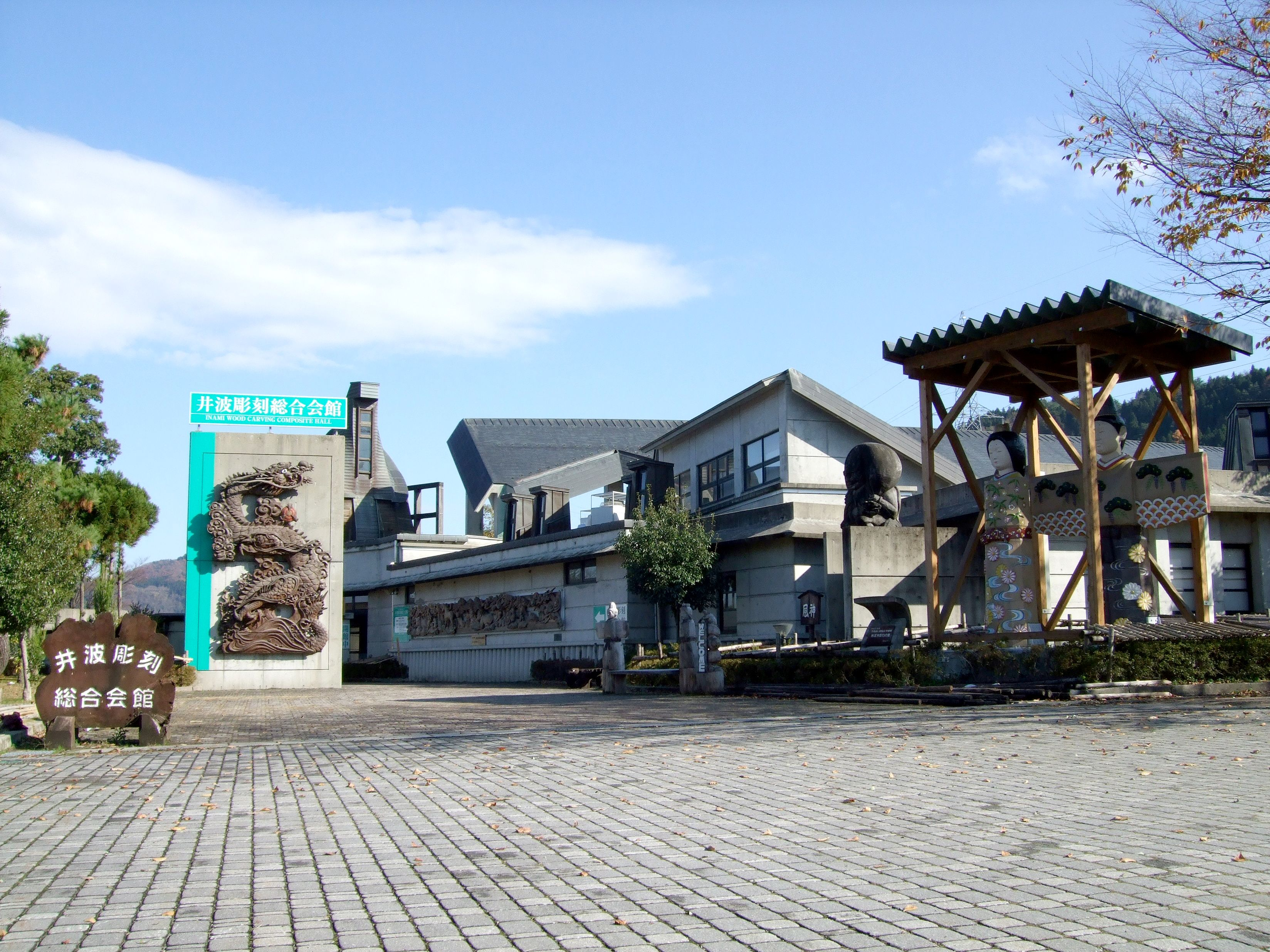
Inami Sculpture General Hall, located in Inami Roadside Station.

In this village roughly 200 woodcarving artisans work and carve wooden pieces of art that fill the town. The town has been a center for the woodcarving industry in Japan for about 250 years. Many of the woodcarvings can be seen walking down Yokamachi Road from Zuisenji Temple. The temple is also known for the wood carvings in the architecture of the building.

=== IOX-AROSA ===
Located in Fukumitsu, in the summer, one can take a gondola up much of Mt. Iozen from here and get a view of most of Nanto City. In the winter it offers skiing and snowboarding down slopes from high up on the Mountain.

=== Taira Ski Area ===
Located in Nashitani village, which belongs to the Gokayama region. It is about a 10-minute drive from the Historic Villages of Ainokura.

=== Zentokuji Temple ===
This temple in Johana was founded roughly 530 years ago. It is a major temple of the Otani sect of Pure Land Buddhism and is home to over 10,000 treasured items including a collection of writings from the sect founder Shinran.

== Education ==
Nanto has nine public elementary schools and eight public junior high schools operated by the town government, and three public high schools operated by the Toyama Prefectural Board of Education.

== Transportation ==
=== Railway ===
- West Japan Railway Company (JR West) - Jōhana Line
  - Takagi - Fukuno - Higashi-Ishiguro - Fukumitsu - Etchū-Yamada - Jōhana

=== Bus routes ===
- Kaetsuno Railway Bus Company
- Toyama Chihō Railway High Speed Bus

=== Highway ===
- Tōkai-Hokuriku Expressway
- National Route 156
- National Route 304
- National Route 359
- National Route 471

== International relations ==
- Shaoxing, Zhejiang, China, friendship city since March 1983
- Delphi, Greece, friendship city since June 1986
- Arosa, Switzerland, friendship city since September 1991
- Pyeongchang County, South Korea, friendship city since September 2002
- Tukuche, Nepal, sister city since January 1989
- (United States) Marlboro, New Jersey, USA, sister city since May 2003

== In media ==
The city Manoyama in the anime Sakura Quest is modeled after Nanto City where the anime studio P.A. Works is headquartered.

== See also ==
- Gokayama
- Minami-Fukumitsu
