= Jōhana Station =

Railway station in Nanto, Toyama Prefecture, Japan

Jōhana Station 城端駅
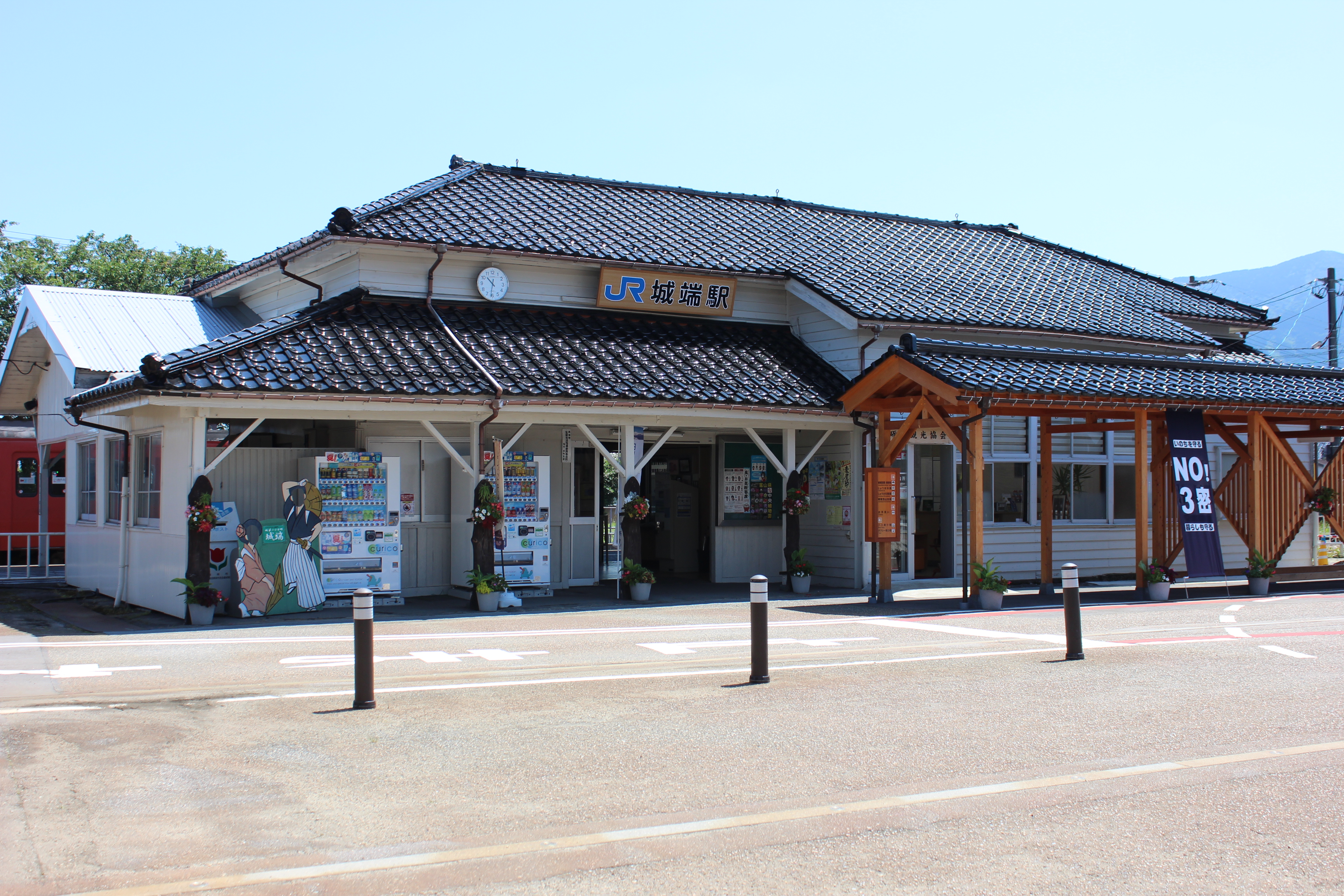
- Jōhana Station in June 2020

General information
- Location: 385 Koreyasu, Nanto-shi, Toyama-ken 939-1852; Japan
- Coordinates: 36°31′20″N 136°54′06″E
- Operator: JR West
- Line: ■ Jōhana Line
- Distance: 29.9 km from Takaoka
- Platforms: 2 side platforms
- Tracks: 2

Construction
- Structure type: At grade

Other information
- Status: Staffed
- Website: Official website

History
- Opened: 31 October 1897; 128 years ago

Passengers
- FY2015: 256 daily
Location
- Location within Japan

Jōhana Station (城端駅, Jōhana-eki) is a railway station on the Jōhana Line in city of Nanto, Toyama, Japan, operated by West Japan Railway Company (JR West).

== Lines ==
Jōhana Station is a terminus of the Jōhana Line, and is located 29.9 kilometers from the opposing end of the line at Takaoka.

== Layout ==
The station has two opposed ground-level side platforms serving two tracks, connected to the wooden station building by a level crossing. The station is staffed.

=== Platforms ===
1	■ Jōhana Line	for Takaoka
2	■ Jōhana Line	for Takaoka

== Adjacent stations ==
«	Service	»
Jōhana Line
Etchū-Yamada	-	Terminus

== History ==
The station opened on 31 October 1897. With the privatization of Japanese National Railways (JNR) on 1 April 1987, the station came under the control of JR West.

== Passenger statistics ==
In fiscal 2015, the station was used by an average of 256 passengers daily (boarding passengers only).

== Surrounding area ==
- Japan National Route 304

== See also ==
- List of railway stations in Japan
