= Japan National Route 304 =

Road in Japan

National Route 304
- 国道304号
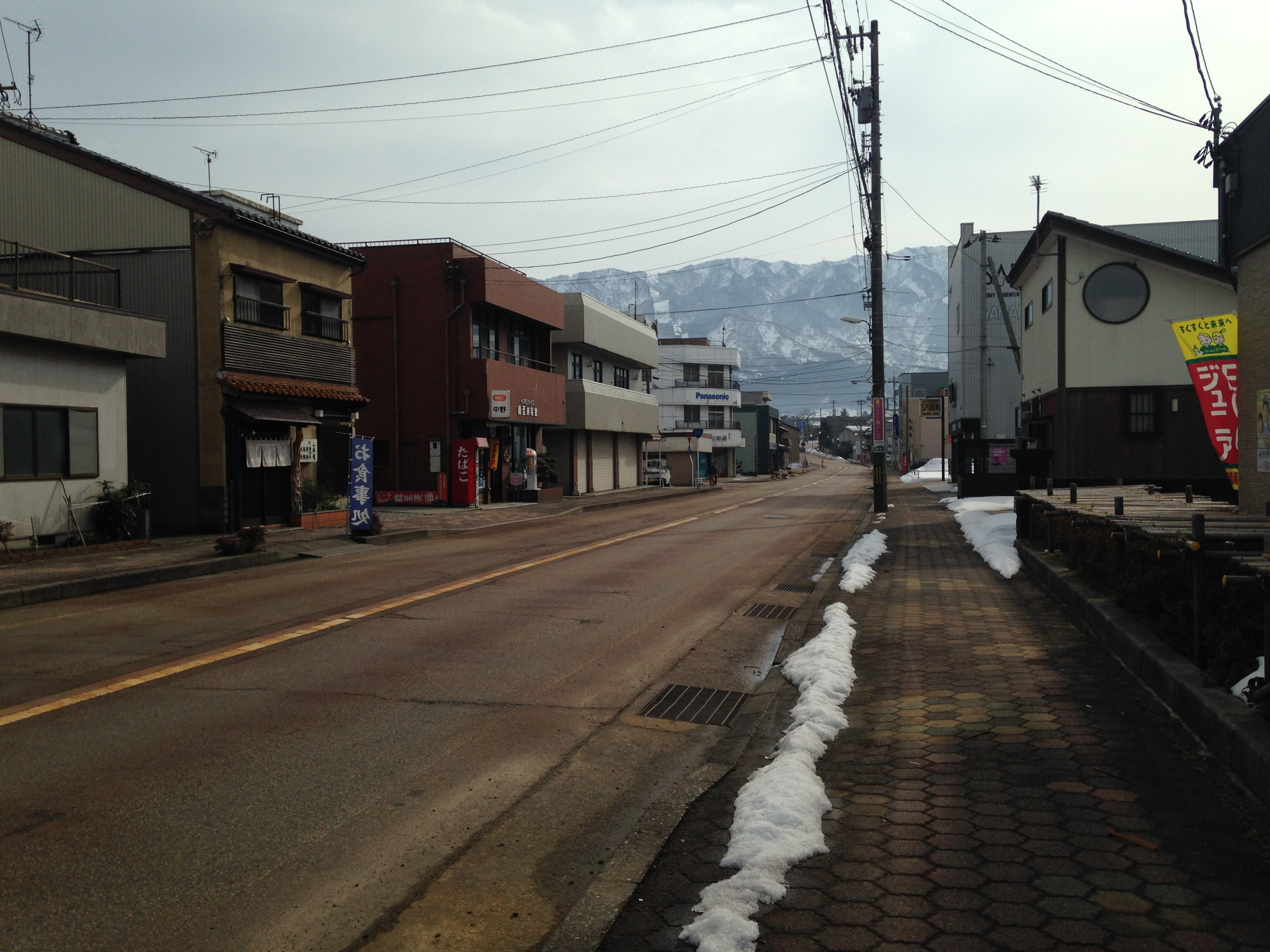

Route information
- Length: 48.6 km (30.2 mi)

Location
- Country: Japan

Highway system
- National highways of Japan; Expressways of Japan
← National Route 303	→ National Route 305

National Route 304 is a national highway of Japan connecting Kanazawa, Ishikawa and Nanto, Toyama, with a total length of 48.6 km (30.2 mi).
