= Shinminato =

Dissolved municipality in Toyama prefecture, Japan

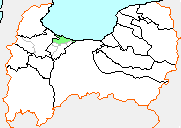
Shinminato

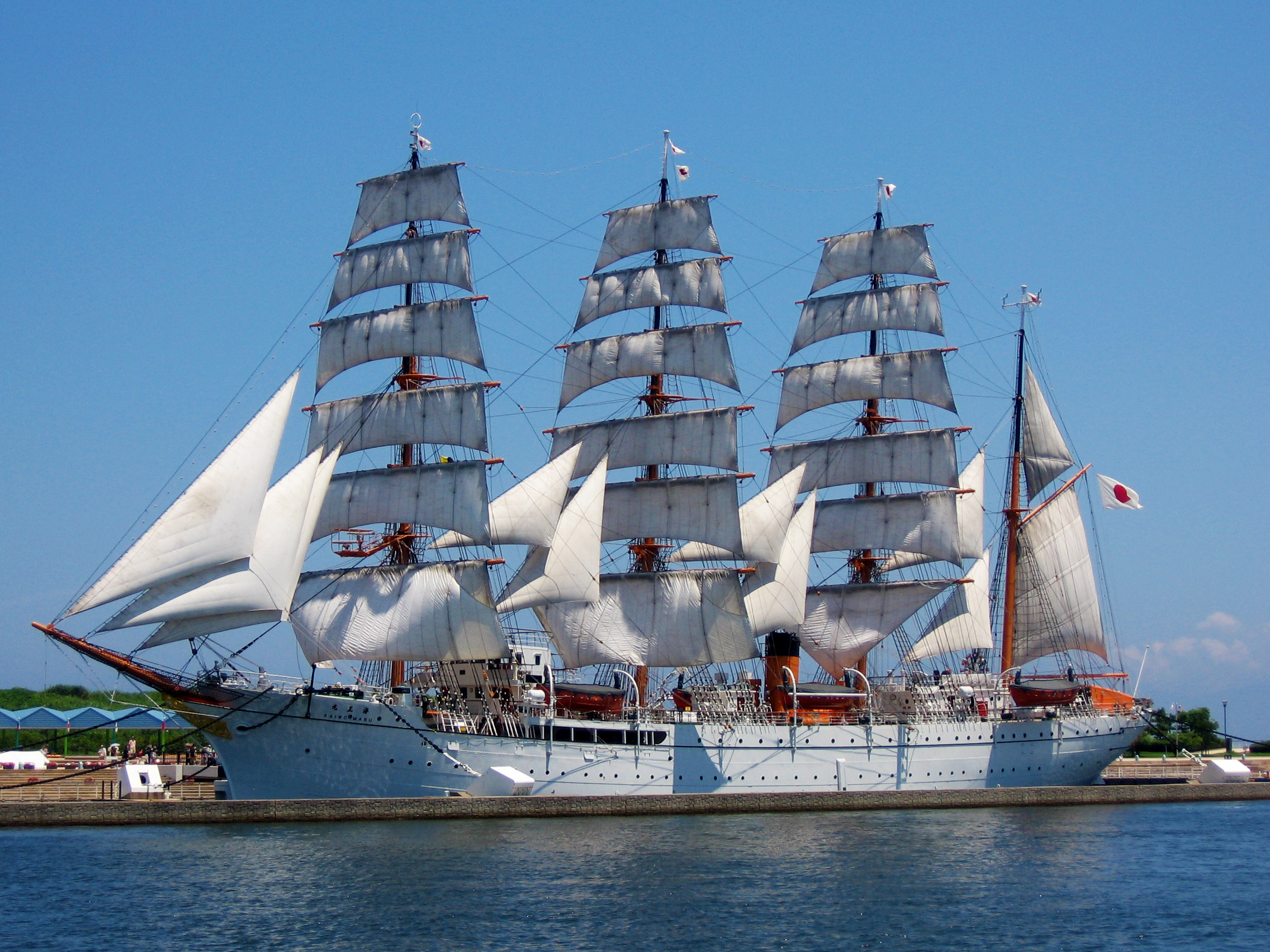
Kaiwo Maru I

Shinminato (新湊市, Shinminato-shi) was a city in Toyama Prefecture, Japan. The city was founded on 15 March 1951 and dissolved in November 2005.

== Demographics ==
As of 2003, the city had an estimated population of 37,094 and the population density of 1,146.29 persons per km^{2}. The total area is 32.36 km^{2}.

== History ==
On November 1, 2005, Shinminato, along with the towns of Daimon, Kosugi and Ōshima, and the village of Shimo (all from Imizu District), was merged to create the city of Imizu, and no longer exists as an independent municipality.

== Places of interest ==
This city was famous for such places as Shinminato-Bridge, Kaiwo-maru Park, Shinminato Fishery, Classical Float Parade in October, and the Uchikawa River.

== Education ==
- Shinminato High School
- Toyama National College of Technology Imizu Campus
