= Kosugi =

Kosugi (written: 小杉 lit. "small Japanese cedar" or コスギ in katakana) is a Japanese surname. Notable people with the surname include:

- Isamu Kosugi (小杉 勇, 1904–1983), Japanese actor and film director
- Jūrōta Kosugi (小杉 十郎太, born 1957), Japanese voice actor
- Kane Kosugi (ケイン・コスギ, born 1974), American karateka and actor
- Ryuichi Kosugi (小杉 竜一, born 1935), Japanese comedian
- Sho Kosugi (ショー・コスギ, born 1948), Japanese karateka and actor
- Shunji Kosugi (小杉 俊二, born 1960), Japanese professional wrestler
- Takashi Kosugi (小杉 隆, born 1935), Japanese politician
- Takehisa Kosugi (小杉 武久, born 1938), Japanese classical composer
- Kosugi Tengai (小杉 天外, 1865–1952), pen-name of Kosugi Tamezō, Japanese writer
- Toshiyuki Kosugi (小杉 敏之, born 1968), Japanese footballer

== See also ==
- Kosugi Station (disambiguation), multiple railway stations in Japan
- Kosugi, Toyama, a former town in Imizu District, Toyama Prefecture, Japan
