= Kaiwo Maru =

A number of ships have been named Kaiwo Maru, including:

- Kaiwo Maru (1930)
- Kaiwo Maru (1989)
