= Kosugimaruyama Site =

Archaeological site in Japan

- 小杉丸山遺跡 (Japanese)
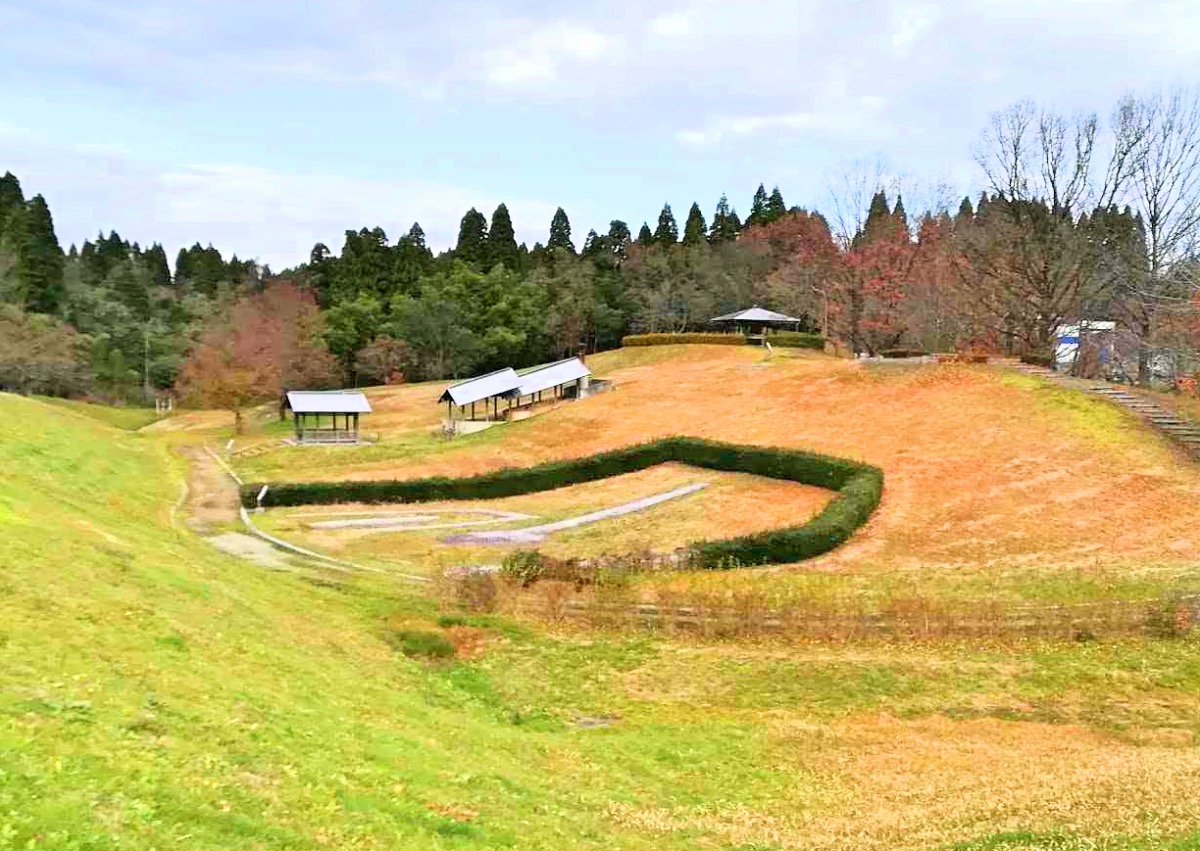
- Kosugimaruyama Site

- Kosugimaruyama Site Kosugimaruyama Site (Japan)
- 36°41′47″N 137°03′55″E
- Periods: Asuka period
- Location: Imizu, Toyama, Japan
- Region: Hokuriku region

History
- Built: 7th century

Site notes
- Area: 32,432 m^{2} (349,100 sq ft)
- Public access: Yes (park and museum)

The Kosugimaruyama Site (小杉丸山遺跡, Kosugimaruyama iseki) is an archaeological site with the ruins of a late Asuka period pottery production site located in what is now the Aoidani neighborhood of the city of Imizu, Toyama Prefecture in the Hokuriku region of Japan. It has been protected as a National Historic Site since 1990.

== Overview ==
The Kosugimaruyama Site located in the southwestern part of the Imizu Hills, in the western part of the Toyama Plain. It contains at least five kilns, workshops, clay mining ditches and at least 24 pit dwellings which were presumably the residences for workers. It was first excavated in 1982 in conjunction with plans to build an industrial park in the area. The kilns were used to produce Sue ware pottery and both cylindrical and flat roof tiles as evidenced by the large number of shards found in the area. It is estimated to date from the late 7th century. During the Asuka period, roof tiles were used mostly for Buddhist temples and major government buildings. The site is one of the earliest such locations found in the Hokuriku region and shows the influence of the central government from the imperial dynasty and the influence of Buddhism during the Asuka period. The site also contained an iron workshop which dates to the Nara period.

A number of buildings have been reconstructed at the site, along with a reconstruction of several anagama kiln. There is also a museum, the Asuka Craftsmen House (飛鳥工人の館, Asuka Kōjin no Yakata) at the site. It is located about 15 minutes by car from Kosugi Station on the Ainokaze Toyama Railway Line.

== See also ==
- List of Historic Sites of Japan (Toyama)
