= Boston Teapot Trophy =

- Boston Teapot Trophy
- Status: Active
- Frequency: Annual
- Country: Varying
- Inaugurated: 1964
- Founder: Sail Training Association
- Most recent: 2023
- Major events: Sail Race
- Organiser: Sail Training International
- Website: sailtraininginternational.org

The Boston Teapot Trophy is an annual international award given to the sail training vessel that covers the greatest distance under sail within a 124-hour period - 5 days and 4 hours. A vessel must have a waterline length exceeding 30 feet (9.14 m) with a majority of the crew under 25 years of age.

The race was first established in 1964 by the Sail Training Association (STA) after a two-boat ‘race’ back to Europe from the US following OpSail 1964. It was originally structured for a more traditional yardstick, the greatest distance covered in 24 hours, won by the Italian yacht Corsaro II, under the command of 1952 Olympics sailing gold medalist Agostino Straulino. It was later expanded to 124 hours to create a more challenging race dependent on the skill of the crew to maintain speed rather than simply stumbling into a short term gust of wind.

The teapot now recognized as the trophy was sponsored by Brooke Bond Tea Ltd. Prince Philip was an early patron of STA and its then biennial Tall Ships Races. He presented the first perpetual trophy to CF Ricardo Franke, Captain of ARA Libertad, in 1966. Libertad travelled 1,335 nautical miles (2,472 km; 1,536 mi) for an average of 10.7 knots (19.8 km/h; 12.3 mph), a record she would hold for 24 years until broken by Kaiwo Maru in 1990.

In 2016, Captain Marcus Seidl set the Guinness World Record aboard Statsraad Lehmkuhl, with an average speed of 12.49 knots (23.13 km/h; 14.37 mph), running a total of 1,556 nautical miles (2,882 km; 1,791 mi). During that run, she saw a high speed of 19.5 knots (36.1 km/h; 22.4 mph). Overall, Statsraad Lehmkuhl has taken home the trophy a total of 9 times, matching ARA Libertad and second to Juan Sebastián de Elcano with 10 wins. Kaiwo Maru previously held the speed record with 1,394 nautical miles (2,582 km; 1,604 mi) travelled at an average speed of 11.2 knots (20.7 km/h; 12.9 mph).

The trophy is a replica of a simple drum-shaped silver tea pot now found at the Museum of Fine Arts, Boston. Made in 1782 by noted silversmith Paul Revere, best known for his midnight ride immortalized by Longfellow, it is one of six known surviving samples of this style made by him. Original teapots by Paul Revere of this style are now worth hundreds of thousands of dollars.

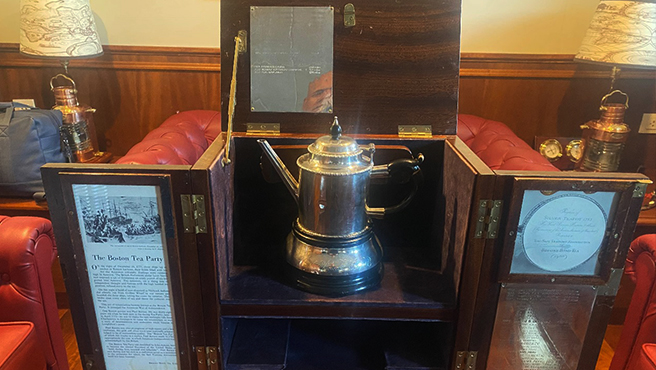
Trophy aboard BAP Union in 2023

The replica trophy is approximately 30 centimetres (12 in) high and 15 centimetres (5.9 in) in diameter with an additional silver base engraved with "The Boston Teapot", and housed in a custom protective wooden box, 40cm x 40cm x 20cm (16in x 16in x 8 in), with a blue velvet lining.

The trophy is currently presented to the winning ship by Sail Training International at their International Sail Training and Tall Ships Conference held in November of each year. The winning ship keeps the trophy for the year.

== Trophy winners ==
Year	Name of ship	Ship registry	Running distance (nm)	Average speed (knots)	Notes
1964	Corsaro II	Italy	1121 nm	9 kts	
1965	Gorch Fock	Germany	1079 nm	8.7 kts	
1966	ARA Libertad	Argentina	1335 nm	10.7 kts	
1967	Gorch Fock	Germany	1040 nm	8.3 kts	
1968	Gorch Fock	Germany	977 nm	7.8 kts	
1969	Gorch Fock	Germany	1191 nm	9.6 kts	
1970	ARC Gloria	Colombia	1058 nm	8.5 kts	
1971	Esmerelda	Chile	1026 nm	8.2 kts	
1972	USCGC Eagle	United States	1100 nm	8.8 kts	
1973	USCGC Eagle	United States	1019 nm	8.2 kts	
1974	ARC Juan Sebastián de Elcano	Spain	952 nm	7.6 kts	
1975	no entry				
1976	ARA Libertad	Argentina	1248 nm	10 kts	
1977	no entry				
1978	no entry				
1979	ARC Juan Sebastián de Elcano	Spain	1029 nm	8.3 kts	
1980	no entry				
1981	ARA Libertad	Argentina	1115 nm	8.9 kts	
1982	Cisne Branco	Brazil	1101 nm	8.8 kts	
1983	Gorch Fock	Germany	1098 nm	8.8 kts	
1984	no entry				
1985	ARA Libertad	Argentina	684 nm	5.5 kts	
1986	Nippon Maru	Japan	955 nm	7.7 kts	
1987	ARA Libertad	Argentina	1174 nm	9.4 kts	
1988	Dar Młodzieży	Poland	1241 nm	10 kts	
1989	Nippon Maru	Japan	1134 nm	9.1 kts	
1990	Kaiwo Maru	Japan	1350 nm	10.8 kts	
1991	Kaiwo Maru	Japan	1244 nm	10 kts	
1992	ARA Libertad	Argentina	1041 nm	8.4 kts	
1993	Nippon Maru	Japan	1201 nm	9.6 kts	
1994	Kaiwo Maru	Japan	1312 nm	10.5 kts	
1995	Kaiwo Maru	Japan	1394 nm	11.2 kts	
1996	no entry				
1997	ARC Juan Sebastián de Elcano	Spain	1126 nm	9 kts	
1998	ARA Libertad	Argentina	1158 nm	9.3 kts	
1999	ARC Juan Sebastián de Elcano	Spain	1088 nm	8.7 kts	
2000	ARA Libertad	Argentina	1218 nm	9.8 kts	
2001	ARC Juan Sebastián de Elcano	Spain	1184 nm	9.5 kts	
2002	ARM Cuauhtémoc	Mexico	1343 nm	10.8 kts	
2003	ARM Cuauhtémoc	Mexico	1064 nm	8.6 nm	
2004	ARC Juan Sebastián de Elcano	Spain	765 nm	6.2 kts	
2005	ARC Juan Sebastián de Elcano	Spain	956 nm	7.7 kts	
2006	ARC Juan Sebastián de Elcano	Spain	1028 nm	8.3 kts	
2007	ARA Libertad	Argentina	1033 nm	8.3 kts	
2008	Statsraad Lehmkuhl	Norway	1116 nm	9 kts	
2009	NRP Sagres	Portugal	1230 nm	9.9 kts	
2010	Statsraad Lehmkuhl	Norway	1443 nm	11.6 kts	
2011	Statsraad Lehmkuhl	Norway	1216 nm	9.8 kts	
2012	Statsraad Lehmkuhl	Norway	1265 nm	10.2 kts	
2013	ARM Cuauhtémoc	Mexico	1189 nm	9.7 kts	
2014	Statsraad Lehmkuhl	Norway	1400 nm	11.3 kts	
2015	ARC Juan Sebastián de Elcano	Spain	919 nm	7.4 kts	
2016	Statsraad Lehmkuhl	Norway	1263 nm	10.2 kts	
2017	Statsraad Lehmkuhl	Norway	1556 nm	12.5 kts	
2018	Statsraad Lehmkuhl	Norway	1254 nm	10.1 kts	
2019	Fryderyk Chopin	Poland	1218 nm	9.8 kts	
2020	ARC Juan Sebastián de Elcano	Spain	1013 nm	8.2 kts	
2021	Fryderyk Chopin	Poland	1288 nm	10.4 kts	
2022	Statsraad Lehmkuhl	Norway	1125 nm	9.1 kts	
2023	BAP Unión	Peru	1261 nm	10.7 kts	
2024	ARM Cuauhtémoc	Mexico	1171 nm	9.4 kts	
2025	ARA Libertad	Argentina	985 nm	7.95 kts	
