= Toyama National College of Maritime Technology =

Former college in Japan

- Type: Public
- Established: 1906
- Administrative staff: full-time, part-time
- Location: Toyama, Toyama Prefecture, Japan
- Campus: Hongo and Imizu Campuses
- Website: www.nc-toyama.ac.jp

Toyama National College of Maritime Technology (富山商船高等専門学校, Toyama shousen koutou senmongakkou) was a maritime college in Imizu, Toyama, Japan, established in 1906. The college merged with Toyama National College of Technology in 2009.

== Toyama college maritime programs ==
The programs are of about 5 to 5.5 years (maritime) including practical training in the sea. The college conducts following maritime programs:

- Nautical Science Program for Deck Officers and Captains
- Marine Engineering Program for Engineering Officers
- International Trade and Transport Program

== See also ==
- List of maritime colleges
