= Bungo Tsuda =

Japanese politician

- 津田 文吾

Governor of Kanagawa Prefecture
- In office 23 April 1967 – 23 April 1975
- Monarch: Hirohito
- Preceded by: Iwatarō Uchiyama
- Succeeded by: Kazuji Nagasu

Personal details
- Born: 24 April 1918 Kosugi, Toyama, Japan
- Died: 8 November 2007 (aged 89) Yokohama, Kanagawa, Japan

Bungo Tsuda (津田 文吾, Tsuda Bungo; 24 April 1918 – 8 November 2007) was a Japanese politician. He served as governor of Kanagawa Prefecture from 23 April 1967 until 22 April 1975.

Tsuda was born in Kosugi, Toyama and died at the age of 89 of colorectal cancer in Yokohama.
