= Imizu =

Imizu 射水市
- City
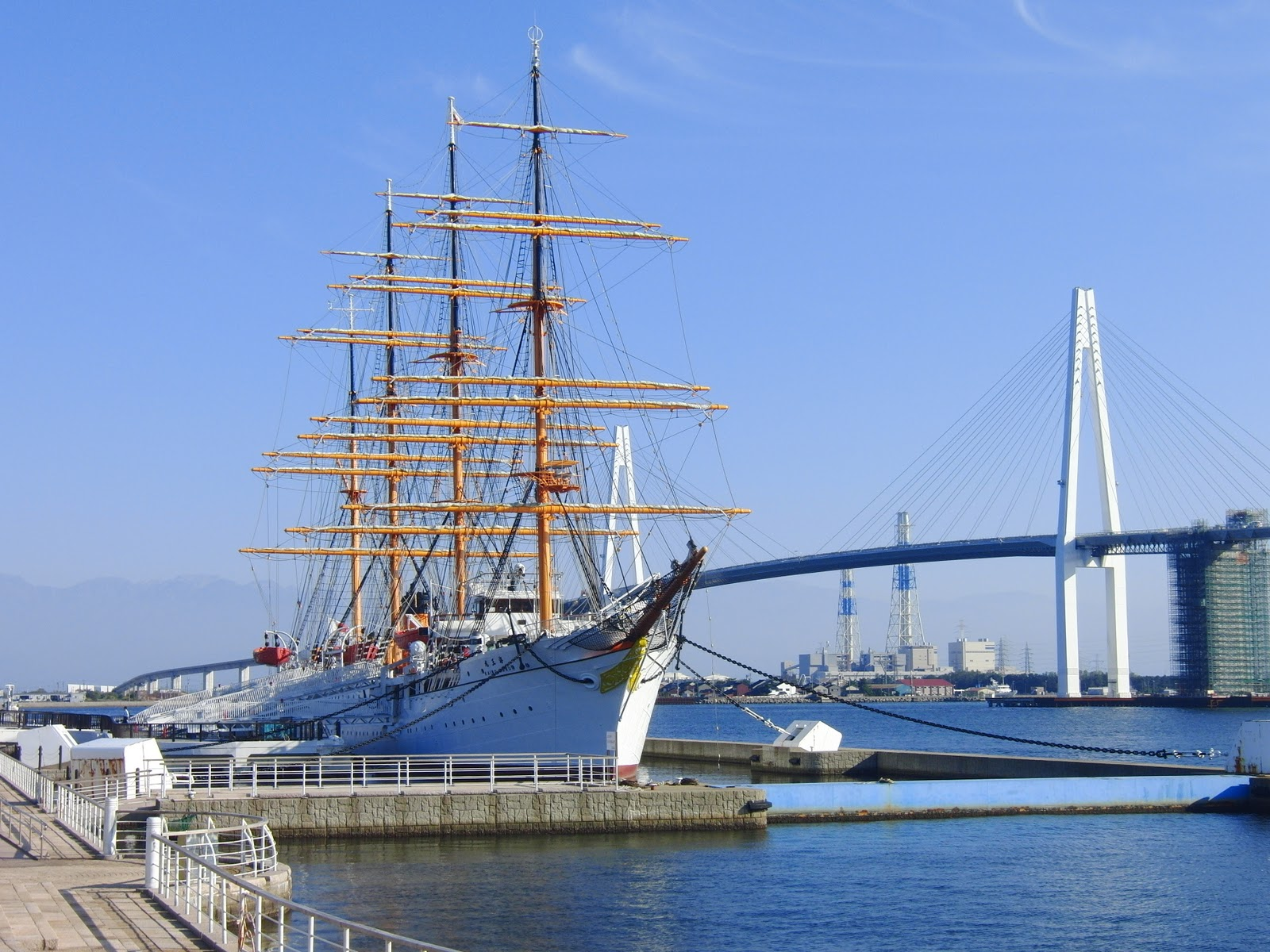
- Kaioumaru Park and Shinminato Bridge

- Flag Emblem

- Location of Imizu in Toyama Prefecture

- Coordinates: 36°43′50″N 137°4′32″E
- Country: Japan
- Region: Chūbu (Hokuriku)
- Prefecture: Toyama

Government
  - Mayor: Motoshi Natsuno

Area
  - Total: 109.43 km^{2} (42.25 sq mi)

Population (October 1, 2020)
  - Total: 90,807
  - Density: 830/km^{2} (2,100/sq mi)
- Time zone: UTC+09:00 (JST)
- Postal code: 939-0294
- Symbols
  - Tree: Fraxinus japonica
  - Flower: Dianthus superbus
  - Flowering tree: Hydrangea macrophylla
  - Fish: Pasiphaea japonica Plecoglossus altivelis
- Phone number: 0766-51-6600
- Address: 410-1 Shinkaihotsu, Imizu-shi, Toyama-ken
- Website: Official website

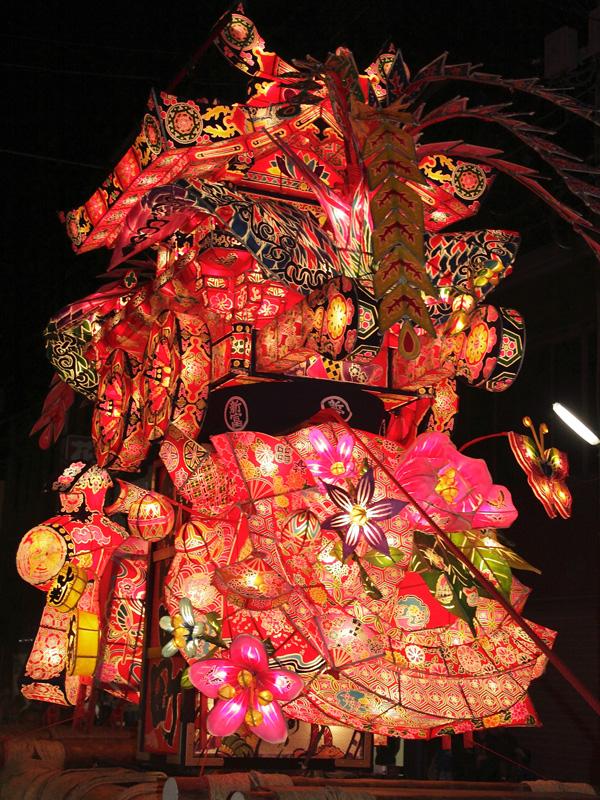
Tonami-yotaka festival held in June

Imizu (射水市, Imizu-shi; Japanese pronunciation: [í.mʲì.(d͡)zɨ̀, ì.mʲí.(d͡)zɨ́.ɕì]) is a city located in Toyama Prefecture, Japan. As of 28 February 2018, the city had an estimated population of 93,447 in 37,734 households and a population density of 850 persons per km^{2}. Its total area was 109.43 square kilometres (42.25 sq mi).

== Geography ==
Imizu is located in the Tonami plains of western Toyama Prefecture, with a coastline on the Sea of Japan to the north. Much of the area is a dispersed settlement typical of this region of Japan. Himi has a humid subtropical climate (Köppen Cfa) characterized by mild summers and cold winters with heavy snowfall. The average annual temperature in Imizu is 14.0 °C. The average annual rainfall is 2380 mm with September as the wettest month. The temperatures are highest on average in August, at around 26.5 °C, and lowest in January, at around 2.7 °C.

=== Surrounding municipalities ===
- Toyama Prefecture
  - Takaoka
  - Tonami
  - Toyama

== Demographics ==
Per Japanese census data, the population of Imizu has remained relatively steady in recent decades.

Historical population
| Year | Pop. | ±% |
|---|---|---|
| 1970 | 83,631 | — |
| 1980 | 91,317 | +9.2% |
| 1990 | 92,912 | +1.7% |
| 2000 | 93,513 | +0.6% |
| 2010 | 93,588 | +0.1% |
| 2020 | 90,742 | −3.0% |

== History ==
The area of present-day Imizu was part of ancient Etchū Province, and was governed during the Edo period as part of Kaga Domain.

The modern city of Imizu was established on November 1, 2005, from the merger of the city of Shinminato, the towns of Daimon, Kosugi and Ōshima, and the village of Shimo (all from Imizu District). Imizu District was dissolved as a result of this merger.

== Government ==
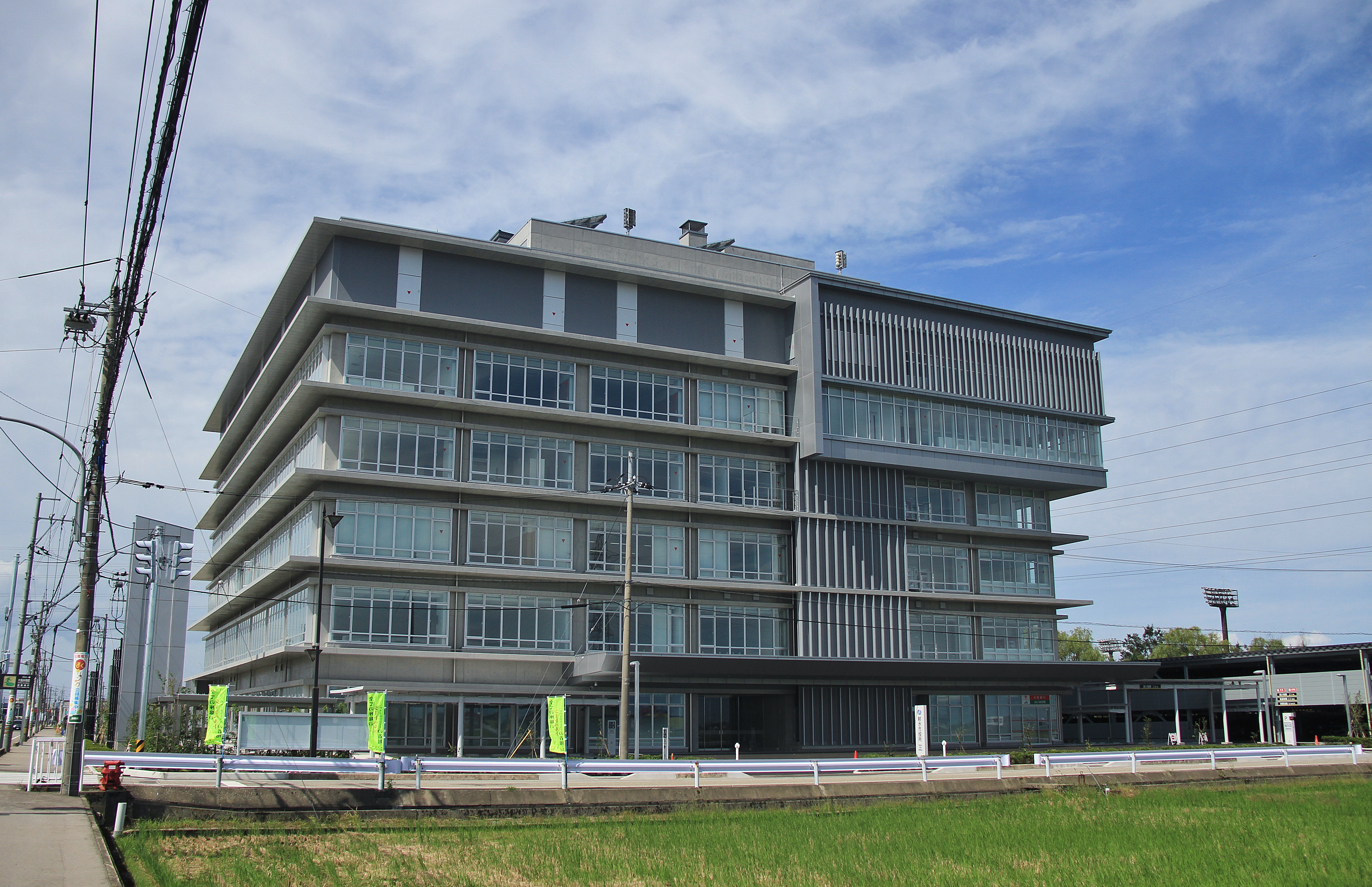
Imizu City Hall

Imizu has a mayor-council form of government with a directly elected mayor and a unicameral city legislature of 22 members.

== Economy ==
=== Businesses headquartered in Imizu ===
- Albis, a retail and wholesale company.
- Toyo Gas Meter

== Education ==
=== Colleges and universities ===
- Toyama Prefectural University
- Toyama College of Welfare Science
- Toyama National College of Technology (Imizu Campus)

=== Primary and secondary education ===
Imizu has fifteen public elementary schools and six public middle schools operated by the town government, and three public high schools operated by the Toyama Prefectural Board of Education. The prefectural also operates two vocational schools in Imizu.

== Transportation ==
=== Railway ===
- Ainokaze Toyama Railway
  - Etchū-Daimon - Kosugi
- Man'yōsen Shinminatokō Line
  - Shōgawaguchi - Rokudōji
- Man'yōsen Shinminatokō Line
  - Koshinokata - Kaiōmaru - Higashi Shinminato - Naka Shinminato - Shinmachiguchi - Nishi Shinminato - Shōgawaguchi - Rokudōji

=== Highway ===
- Hokuriku Expressway
- National Route 8
- National Route 415
- National Route 472

== Local attractions ==
- Kaiwomaru Park, with the training tall ship Kaiwo Maru.
- Kosugimaruyama Site, an archaeological park with the ruins of a late Asuka period pottery production site. It is a National Historic Site.
- Kushidashin Site, an archaeological park containing the remnants of a late Jōmon period settlement and two circular Kofun period burial mounds. It is a National Historic Site.

== Notable people from Imizu ==
- Matsutaro Shoriki, media mogul, politician, and the father of Japanese professional baseball.
- Megumi Tachimoto, judoka
- Shinosuke Tatekawa, rakugo performer, and TV presenter.
- Bungo Tsuda, politician.
- Atsushi Yanagisawa, professional football player.
- Anna Tanaka, singer
