= Himi District =

Former district in Toyama Prefecture, Japan

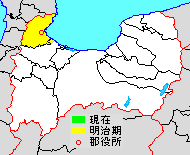
Map showing original extent of Himi District in Toyama Prefecture: * yellow - areas formerly within the district borders during the early Meiji period

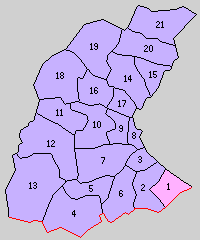
Colored areas are in this district.

Himi (氷見郡, Himi-gun) was a district located in Toyama Prefecture, Japan. It was originally part of Imizu District until 1896.

== History ==
=== District Timeline ===
- April 1, 1896 - Himi District was created from a split within Imizu District, grouped by the town of Himi and 20 villages.
- April 1, 1954 - The villages of Kamishiro (Jindai), Busshōji, Fuse, Jūnichō, Hayakawa, Kume, Ao, Yabuta, Unami and Jorō were merged into the expanded city of Himi. Therefore, Himi District dissolved as a result of this merger.

== See also ==
- List of dissolved districts of Japan
