= Kosugi Station =

Kosugi Station may refer to:

- Kosugi Station (Imizu), an Ainokaze Toyama Railway station in Imizu, Toyama, Japan
- Kosugi Station (Toyama, Toyama), a Toyama Chihō Railway station in Toyama, Toyama, Japan
