= Daimon, Toyama =

Dissolved municipality in Imizu district, Toyama prefecture, Japan

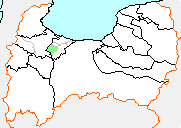
Location of Daimon in Toyama Prefecture

Daimon (大門町, Daimon-machi) was a town located in Imizu District, Toyama Prefecture, Japan.

As of 2003, the town had an estimated population of 12,419 and a density of 570.46 persons per km^{2}. The total area was 21.77 km^{2}.

On November 1, 2005, Daimon, along with the city of Shinminato, the towns of Kosugi and Ōshima, the village of Shimo (all from Imizu District), was merged to create the city of Imizu and no longer exists as an independent municipality.
