= Ōshima, Toyama =

Dissolved municipality in Toyama prefecture, Japan

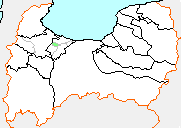
Oshima Town

Ōshima (大島町, Ōshima-machi) was a town located in Imizu District, Toyama Prefecture, Japan.

As of 2003, the town had an estimated population of 10,108 and a density of 1,269.85 persons per km^{2}. The total area was 7.96 km^{2}.

On November 1, 2005, Ōshima, along with the city of Shinminato, the towns of Daimon and Kosugi, and the village of Shimo (all from Imizu District), was merged to create the city of Imizu and no longer exists as an independent municipality.
