= Albis (store) =

Retail and Wholesale company headquartered in Japan

- Company type: Kabushiki kaisha
- Industry: retail, wholesale supermarket
- Founded: 1968-12-23
- Headquarters: Imizu, Toyama Prefecture, Japan
- Area served: Toyama, Ishikawa and Fukui Prefectures, Japan
- Revenue: ¥65,846,000,000

Albis (アルビス株式会社, Arubisu Kabushiki Kaisha) is a retail and wholesale company headquartered in Imizu, Toyama Prefecture, Japan. It is listed on the second tier of the Nagoya Stock Exchange (code 7475). The name stands for "Active Leader with Best Information and Strategy".

== History ==
In June 1966, with the assistance of the Tōkai Dry Goods Company (東海乾物株式会社, Tōkai Hoshimono Kabushiki Kaisha), the Tulip Chain retailers' cooperative was formed. In December 1968, 10 managers of supermarkets within Toyama Prefecture came together to establish the Hokuriku Tulip Chain (チューリップチェーン株式会社, Chūrippu Chēn Kabushiki Kaisha) and to set up the headquarters for the cooperative. The company subsequently changed its name to Tulip (株式会社チューリップ, Kabushiki Kaisha Tulip) in August 1971.

Due to expansion, the company established an international headquarters as well as district headquarters in September 1977. The company again changed its name in July 1978 to Toyamaken Prefectural District Super(market) Headquarters (富山県地区スパー本部株式会社, Toyama Kenchiku Sūpā Honbu Kabushiki Kaisha), and then to Hokuriku Super(market) Headquarters (北陸スパー本部株式会社, Hokuriku Sūpā Honbu Kabushiki Kaisha) in July 1985. The company then merged with Hokuriku Hotspar in November that same year.

The Albis retailers' cooperative was formed in April 1992 with the merger of the Hokuriku Super wholesale company and the Tulip Kōrigyō retail chain. The company is divided into two departments—retail and wholesale—and has expanded throughout Toyama, Ishikawa and Fukui Prefectures. The company's focus has been to champion the cause of the integrated supermarket, provide information on those working against small chain supermarkets, and offer proactive consulting services and support services.

Albis also has supermarkets under the names Tulip and Hi-Tomato.
