= Shimo, Toyama =

Dissolved municipality in Toyama prefecture, Japan

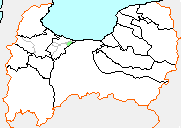
Shimo Village

Shimo (下村, Shimo-mura) was a village located in Imizu District, Toyama Prefecture, Japan.

As of 2003, the village had an estimated population of 2,065 and a density of 356.03 persons per km^{2}. The total area was 5.80 km^{2}.

On November 1, 2005 Shimo, along with the city of Shinminato, and the towns of Daimon, Kosugi and Ōshima (all from Imizu District), was merged to create the city of Imizu and no longer exists as an independent municipality.
