= Imizu District =

Former district in Toyama Prefecture, Japan

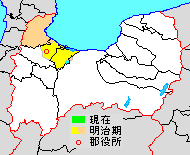
Map showing original extent of Imizu District in Toyama Prefecture: * yellow - areas formerly within the district borders during the early Meiji period

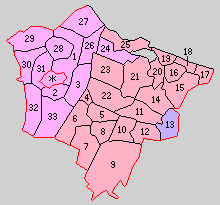
Colored areas are in this district.

Imizu (射水郡, Imizu-gun) was a district located in Toyama Prefecture, Japan.

As of 2003, the district had an estimated population of 57,362 with a density of 747.39 persons per km^{2}. The total area was 76.75 km^{2}.

== Municipalities ==
Prior to its dissolution, the district consisted of three towns, and one village:

- Daimon (Note: Classified as a town.)
- Kosugi
- Ōshima
- Shimo (Note: Classified as a village.)

Notes

Before the dissolution, the district was surrounded by the city of Toyama to the east, the city of Takaoka to the West and South (the city of Tonami also surrounds parts of the southern border), and the city of Shinminato to the north.

== History ==
When the municipal reorganization was created in 1878, the district seat was located at the town of Takaoka (later became the city of Takaoka). When the Regional Office was placed in 1942, The Imizu Regional Office seat was located at the town of Kosugi.

=== District Timeline ===
- 1889 (5 towns, 49 villages)
  - At the time of enforcing the city status, the town of Takaoka gained city status.
  - At the time of enforcing the town and village status, the district formed the town of Himi, Shinminato, Kosugi, Daimon, and Fushigi along with 49 villages.
- April 1, 1896 - The town of Himi and 20 villages split and created Himi District. (4 towns, 29 villages)
- January 1, 1915 - The village of Uchidemotoe was renamed to Motoe.
- May 15, 1917 - The village of Kakekaihatsu was merged into the city of Takaoka. (4 towns, 28 villages)
- August 1, 1925 - The village of Shimonoseki was merged into the city of Takaoka. (4 towns, 27 villages)
- June 1, 1928 - The villages of Yokota and Saijo were merged into the city of Takaoka. (4 towns, 25 villages)
- August 1, 1933 - The village of Nikami was merged into the city of Takaoka. (4 towns, 24 villages)
- December 1, 1940 - The village of Makino was merged into the town of Shinminato. (4 towns, 23 villages)
- April 1, 1942 - The town of Fushiki, and the villages of Kumamachi, Moriyama, No, Sano, and Futazuka were merged into the city of Takaoka. (3 towns, 18 villages)
- June 8, 1942 - The village of Hashishimojo was merged into the town of Kosugi. (3 towns, 17 villages)
- October 2, 1942 - The town of Shinminato was merged into the city of Takaoka. (2 towns, 17 villages)
- January 1, 1951 - The town of Shinminato, and the village of Makino (both re-founded) were split from the city of Takaoka. (3 towns, 18 villages)
- April 4, 1951 - The town of Shinminato was elevated to city status. (2 towns, 18 villages)
- April 4, 1951 - The village of Makino was merged into the city of Takaoka (for the 2nd time). (2 towns, 17 villages)
- April 1, 1953 - The villages of Sakudo, Kataguchi, Horioka, Ebie, Shichibi, and Motoe were merged into the city of Shinminato. (2 towns, 11 villages)
- October 5, 1953 - The village of Tsukahara was merged into the city of Shinminato. (2 towns, 10 villages)
- November 15, 1953 - The village of Kanayama was merged into the town of Kosugi. (2 towns, 9 villages)
- December 1, 1953 - The village of Oe was merged into the town of Kosugi. (2 towns, 8 villages)
- March 1, 1954 (2 towns, 3 villages)
  - The town of Daimon and the villages of Kushida, Azai, Mitota, and Futaguchi were merged to create the town of Daimon.
  - The village of Rota was merged with the villages of Kureha, Nagaoka, and Samue (all from Nei District) to create the town of Kureha (in Nei District).
- March 27, 1954 - The village of Kurokawa was merged into the town of Kosugi. (2 towns, 2 villages)
- April 1, 1959 - The village of Kosugi had added parts of the village of Iketa (from Nei District).
- April 1, 1969 - The village of Ōshima was elevated to town status. (3 towns, 1 village)

=== Recent mergers ===
- November 1, 2005 - The towns of Daimon, Kosugi and Ōshima, and the village of Shimo were merged with the city of Shinminato to form the city of Imizu. Therefore, Imizu District dissolved as a result of this merger.

== See also ==
- List of dissolved districts of Japan
