= Toyama College of Business and Information Technology =

Technical college in Toyama, Japan

Coordinates: 36°43′31.3″N 137°5′48.8″E

Toyama College of Business and Information Technology (富山情報ビジネス専門学校, Toyama jōhō bijinesu senmongakkō) is a technical college in Imizu, Toyama, Japan. It is located across the street from Toyama College of Welfare Science.
