= Kosugi Station (Imizu) =

Railway station in Imizu, Toyama Prefecture, Japan

Kosugi Station 小杉駅
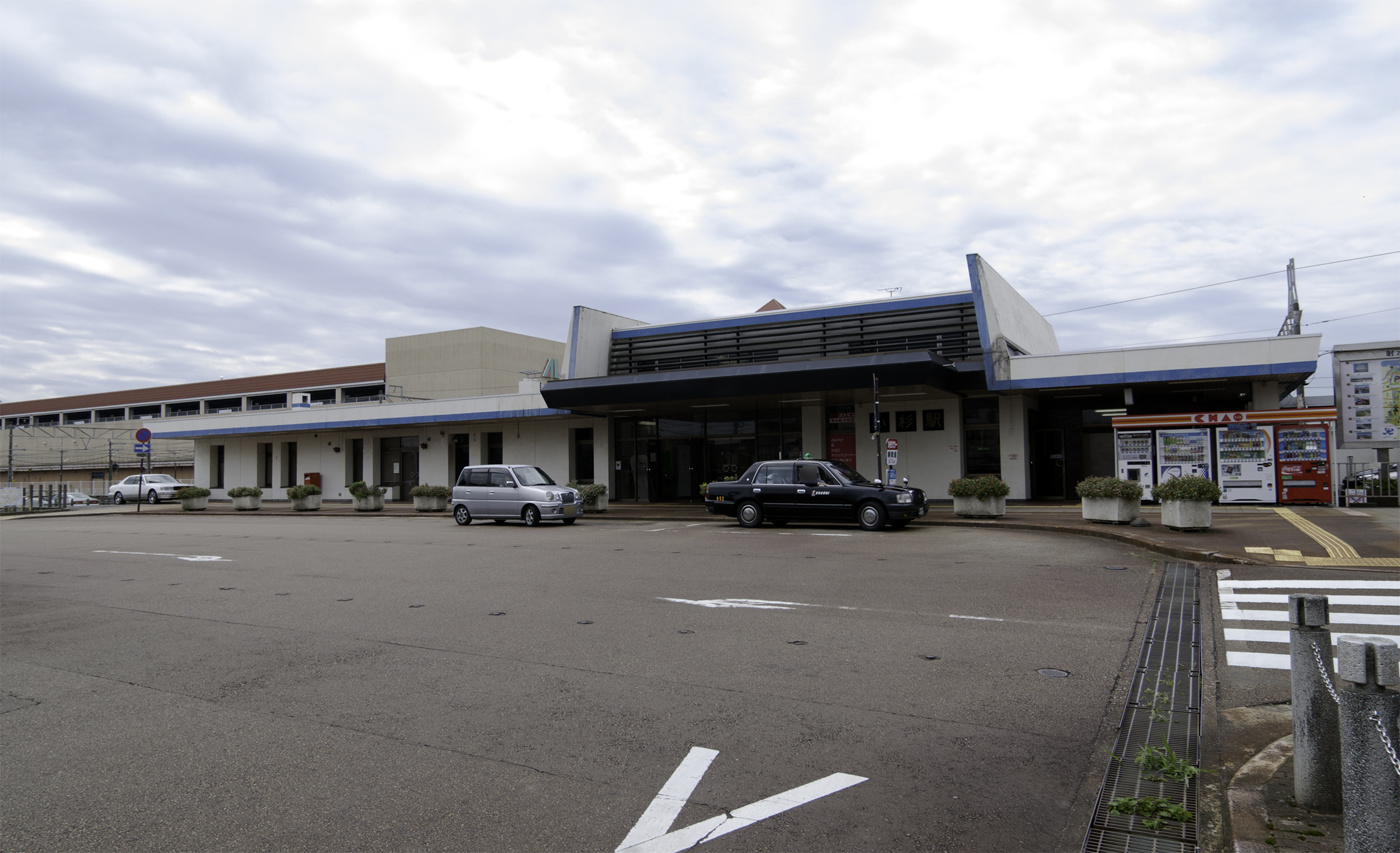
- Kosugi Station building, September 2011

General information
- Location: 4156-2, Sanga, Imizu-shi, Toyama-ken 939-0341; Japan
- Coordinates: 36°43′15″N 137°05′34″E
- Operator: Ainokaze Toyama Railway
- Line: ■ Ainokaze Toyama Railway Line
- Distance: 30.2 km from Kurikara
- Platforms: 1 side + 1 island platforms
- Tracks: 3
- Connections: Bus stop

Other information
- Status: Staffed
- Website: Official website

History
- Opened: 20 March 1899

Passengers
- FY2015: 3,064
Location
- Location within Japan

Kosugi Station (小杉駅, Kosugi-eki) is a railway station on the Ainokaze Toyama Railway Line in Imizu, Toyama, Japan, operated by the third-sector railway operator Ainokaze Toyama Railway.

== Lines ==
Kosugi Station is served by the 100.1 km Ainokaze Toyama Railway Line, and is 30.2 kilometres from the starting point of the line at Kurikara.

== Station layout ==
Kosugi Station has one side platform and one island platform connected by a footbridge. The station is staffed.

=== Platforms ===
| 1 | ■ Ainokaze Toyama Railway Line | for Toyama and Uozu |
| 2, 3 | ■ Ainokaze Toyama Railway Line | for Takaoka and Kanazawa |

== History ==
The station opened on 20 March 1899. With the privatization of JNR on 1 April 1987, the station came under the control of JR West.

From 14 March 2015, with the opening of the Hokuriku Shinkansen extension from Nagano to Kanazawa, local passenger operations over sections of the Hokuriku Main Line running roughly parallel to the new shinkansen line were reassigned to different third-sector railway operating companies. From this date, Kosugi Station was transferred to the ownership of the third-sector operating company Ainokaze Toyama Railway.

== Adjacent stations ==
| « | Service | » |
Ainokaze Toyama Railway Line
| Takaoka | Ainokaze Liner | Toyama |
| Etchū-Daimon | Local | Kureha |

== Passenger statistics ==
In fiscal 2015, the station was used by an average of 3,064 passengers daily (boarding passengers only).

== Surrounding area ==
- Imizu City Hall
- Toyama Prefectural University
- Toyama College of Business and Information Technology

== See also ==
- List of railway stations in Japan
