= Kaiwo Maru (1989) =

Japanese four-masted training barque tall ship

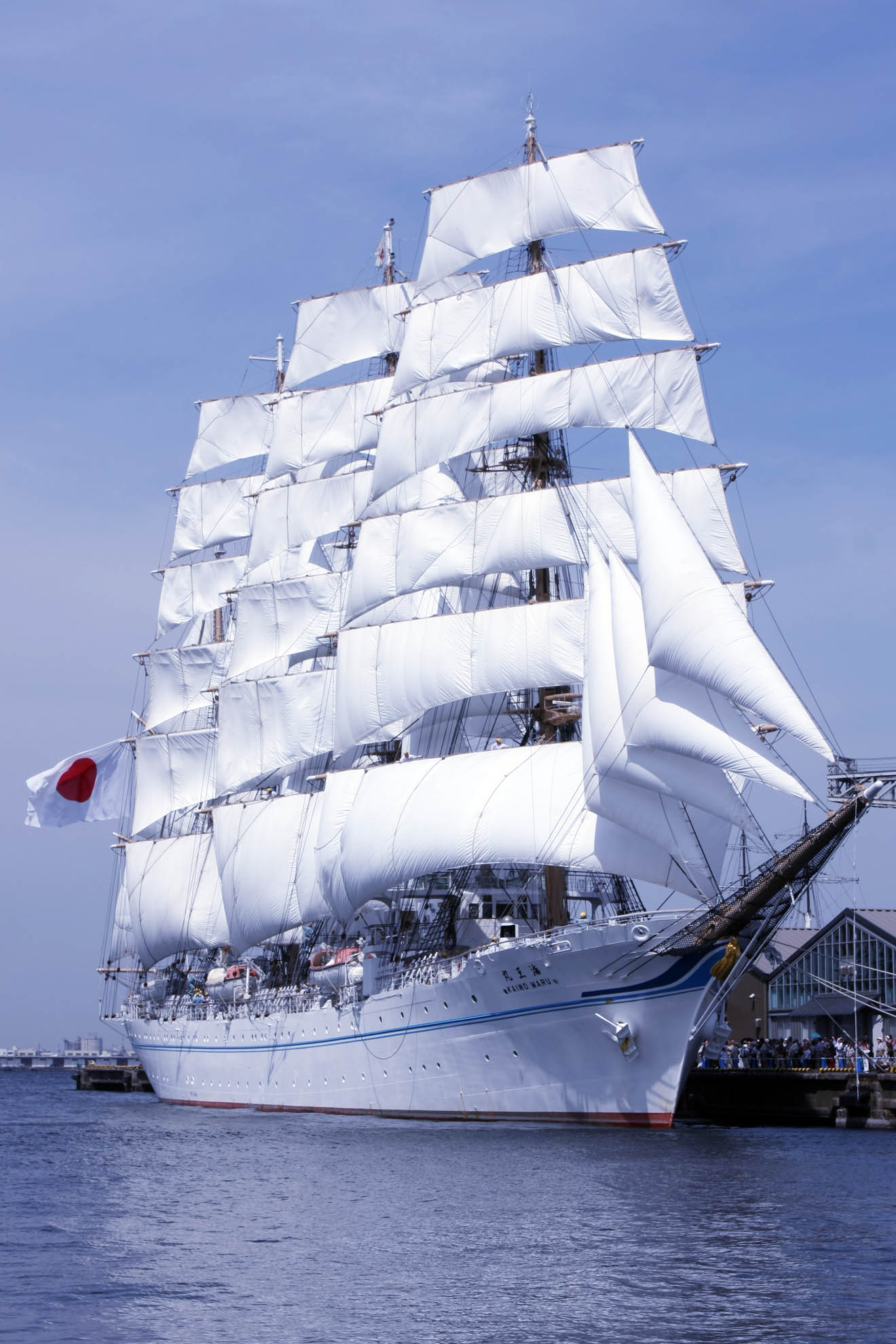

History

Japan
- Name: Kaiwo Maru (海王丸)
- Owner: Japanese Government
- Operator: Agency of Maritime Education and Training for Seafarer (海技教育機構)
- Port of registry: Japan
- Builder: Sumitomo Heavy Industries
- Laid down: 8 July 1988
- Launched: 7 March 1989
- Completed: 12 September 1989
- Identification: Call sign: JMMU; IMO number: 8801010; MMSI number: 431006000
- Status: Operational

General characteristics
- Class & type: Sail training vessel
- Tonnage: 2,556 GT
- Length: 110.09 m (361.2 ft) LOA; 89.00 m (291.99 ft) LOD
- Beam: 13.80 m (45.3 ft)
- Height: 55.50 m (182.1 ft)
- Draught: 6.9 m (23 ft)
- Depth: 10.70 m (35.1 ft)
- Propulsion: 2 x Yanmar Z280-ST diesel engines
- Sail plan: Four-masted Barque; Sail area: 2,760 square metres (29,700 sq ft)
- Speed: 13 knots (24 km/h)
- Range: 9,800 nautical miles (18,100 km) under power
- Complement: 199

Kaiwo Maru (海王丸, Kaiō-Maru) is a Japanese four-masted training barque tall ship. She was built in 1989 to replace a 1930 ship of the same name.

The ship is currently operated by the Japan Agency of Maritime Education and Training for Seafarers (JMETS) (海技教育機構), under the Ministry of Land, Infrastructure, Transport and Tourism (MLIT). JMETS trains future navigators and engineers, and is based in Yokohama, Japan.

Kaiwo Maru is a regular participant in international tall ship gatherings, such as Operation Sail.

== Description ==
A sister ship of Nippon Maru, Kaiwo Maru is a Class-A four masted barque with a complement of 81 crew and 108 trainees. Kaiwo Maru is 110.09 m (361.2 ft) overall, with a beam of 13.80 m (45.3 ft) and a depth of 6.6 m (22 ft). The ship is 182 feet high, and its four masts support 36 sails. The four masts are the fore mast, main mast, mizzen mast and jigger mast. The main mast is 43.50 m (142.7 ft).

The Kaiwo Maru has a range of 9,800 nmi (18,100 km; 11,300 mi) under power. Propulsion is by two Yanmar Z280-ST diesel engines and a total of 2,760 m^{2} (29,700 sq ft) of sails. The engines have a total power of 3,000 horsepower (2,200 kW) and can propel the ship at a maximum of 14.1 kn (26.1 km/h; 16.2 mph), with a normal service maximum of 13 kn (24 km/h; 15 mph). The ship is assessed as 2,556 GT (gross tonnage).

== History ==
Kaiwo Maru's keel was laid by Sumitomo Heavy Industries on July 8, 1988 at the Uraga shipyard, near Yokohama, Japan. She was launched on March 7, 1989, and commissioned by the former National Institute for Sea Training (NIST) (航海訓練所) on September 12, 1989.

On 20 Oct. 2004, Kaiwo Maru was nearly lost in Typhoon Tokage, while sheltering outside the port of Fushiki in the Bay of Toyama, Japan. She dragged her anchor and grounded on a breakwater, receiving severe damage. Her crew of 167, mostly young cadets, was evacuated. Helicopters responded, but were unable to drop lines. So rescuers fixed ropes to the breakwater and crewmembers climbed along them. Thirty were injured, including some with broken bones. Her captain later accepted responsibility. A month later she was lifted by a floating crane and returned to Uraga shipyard. The ship sailed again in January 2006 after major repairs.

In 2010, Kaiwo Maru visited San Francisco, California to commemorate the 1860 voyage of the Kanrin Maru, the first Japanese ship to officially visit the United States. About 90 percent of the journey was made under sail, and they brought one passenger, a retired businessman who is descended from one of the original Kanrin Maru crew members.

In March 2011, Kaiwo Maru was on a voyage from Japan to Honolulu, Hawaii when an earthquake and tsunami struck Japan. She was subsequently diverted to Ōkuma, Fukushima where she served as accommodation for workers tackling the nuclear crisis at the Fukushima I Nuclear Power Plant.

== Awards ==
Kaiwo Maru is a multiple winner of the Boston Teapot Trophy, holding the speed record for 26 years from 1990 to 2016.

== Gallery ==
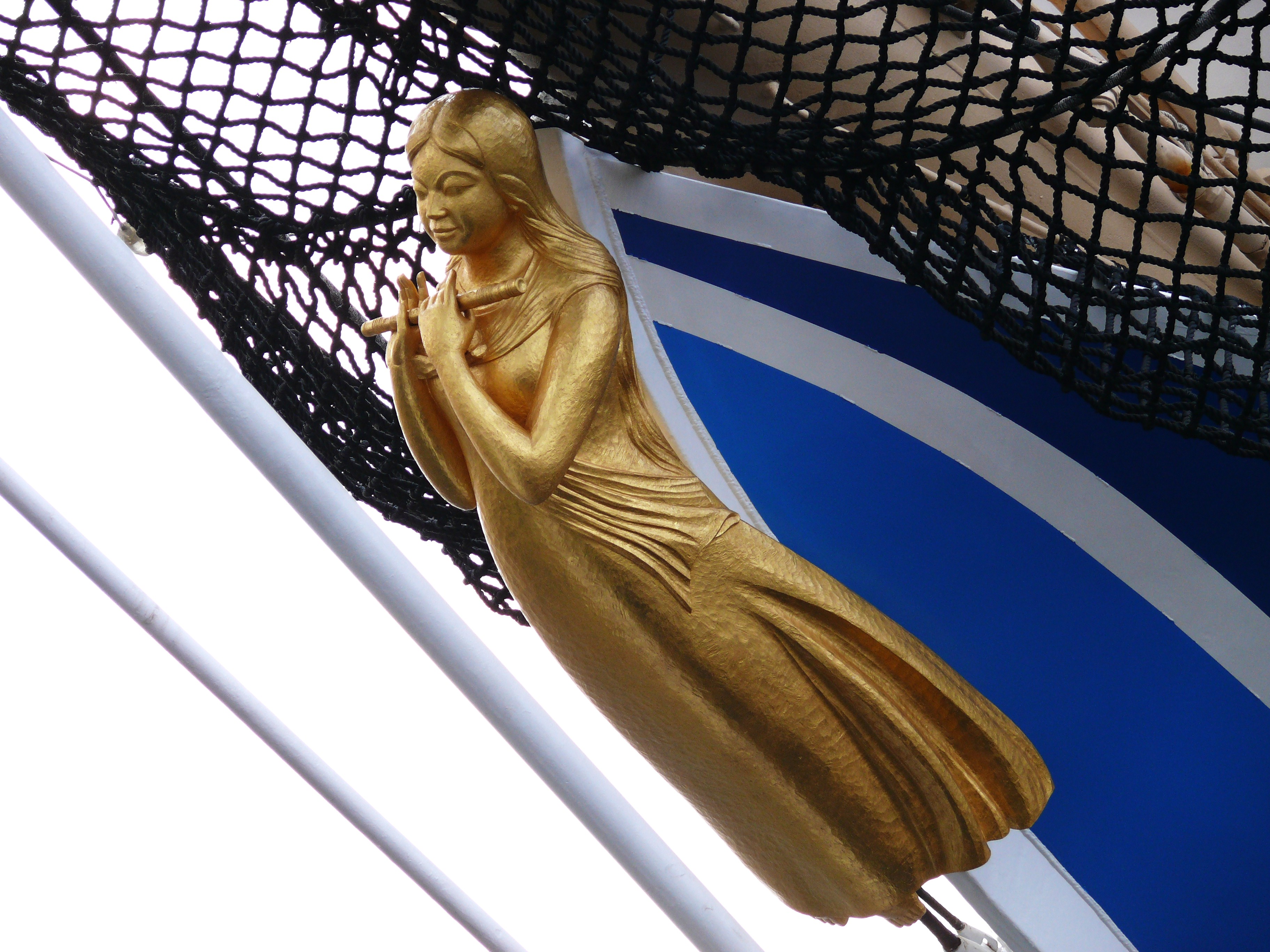
Kaiwo Maru's figurehead

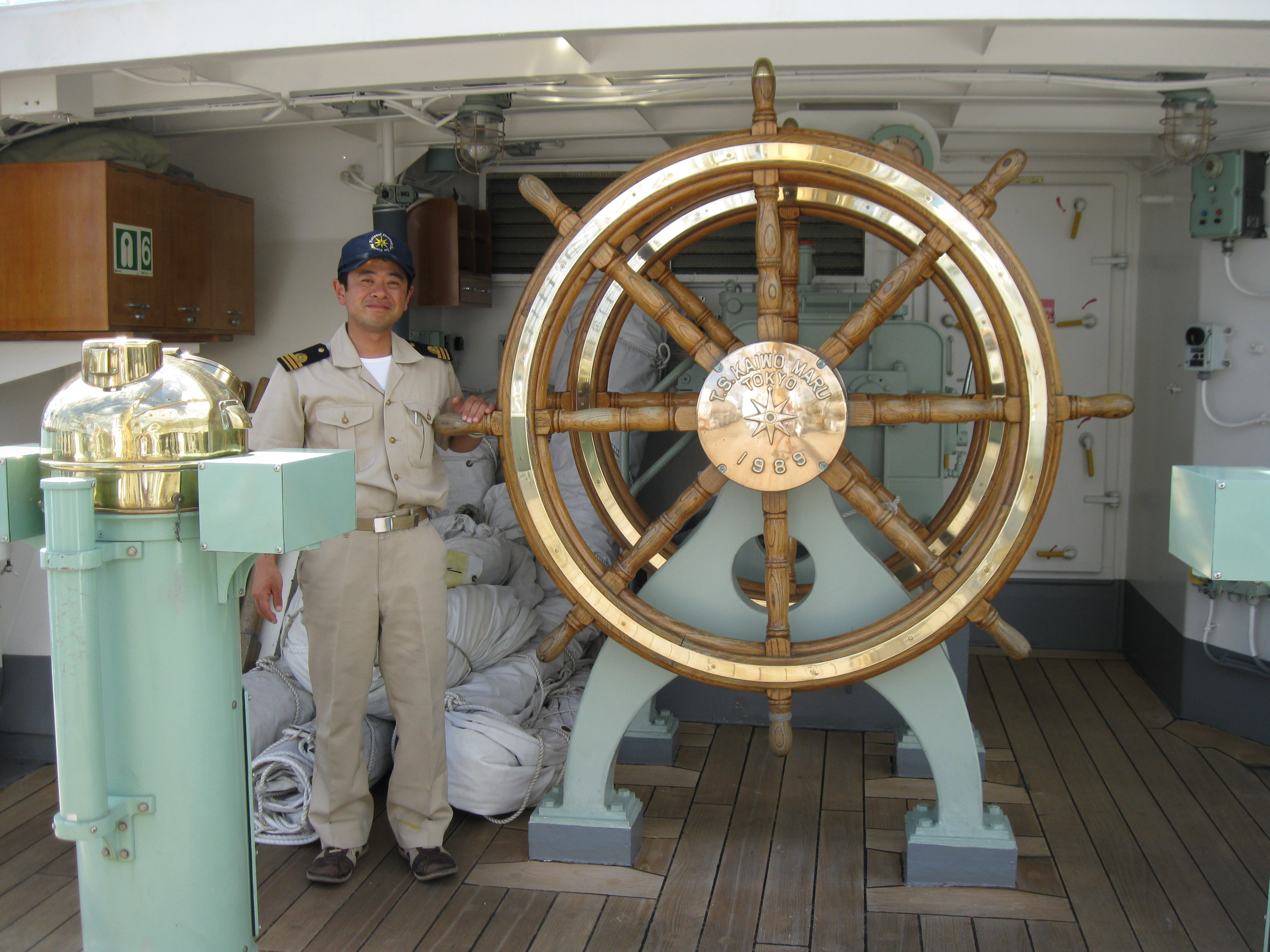
Helm aboard Kaiwo Maru

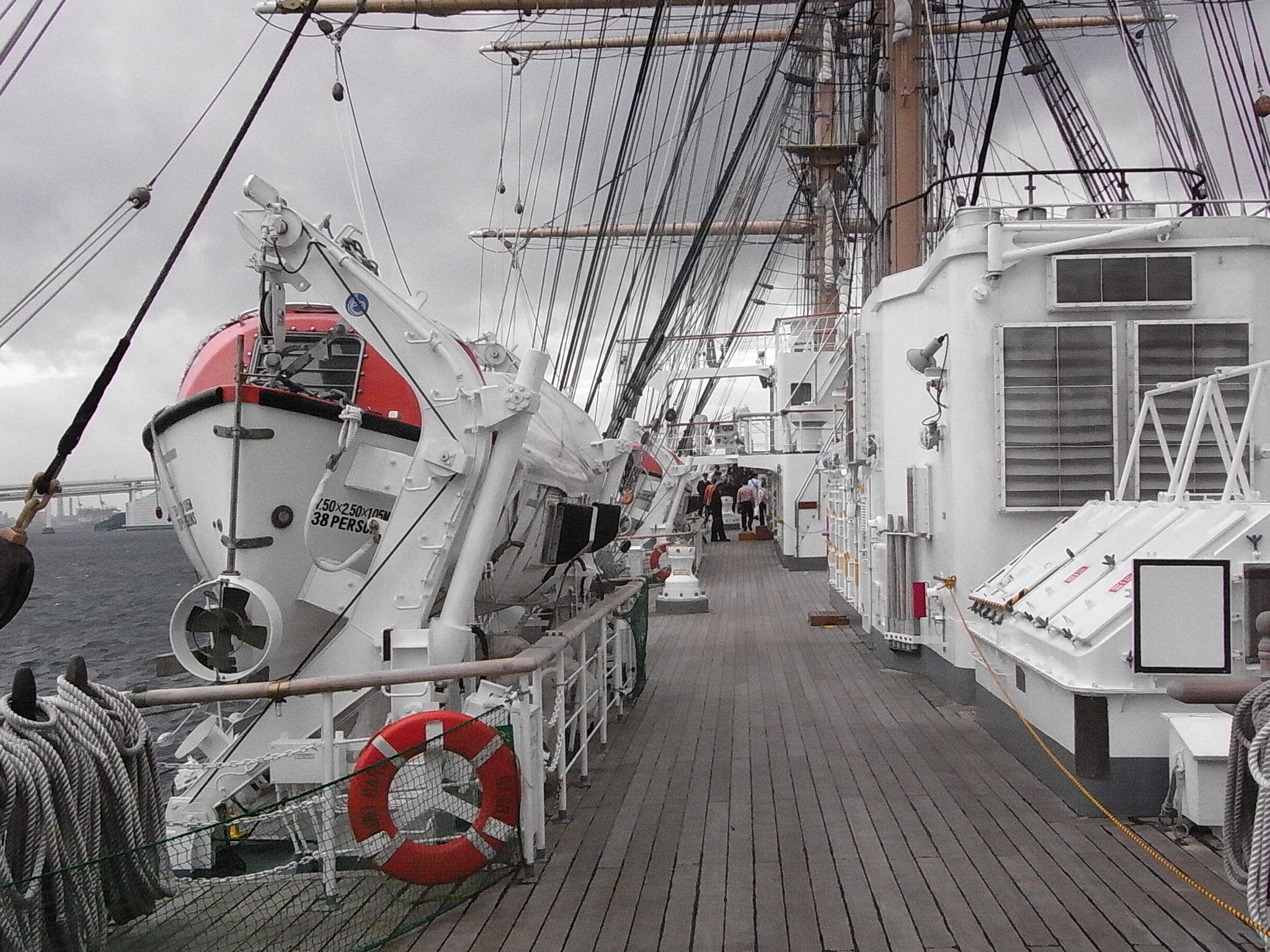
Kaiwo Maru deck looking forward

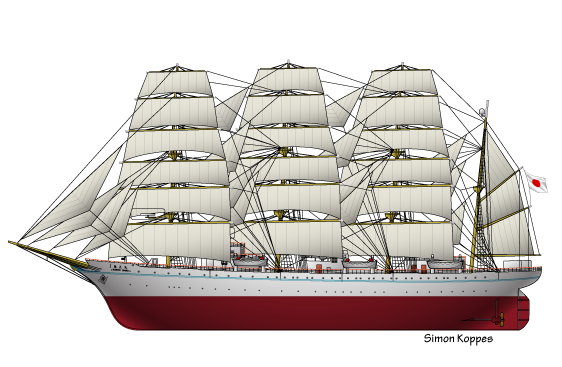
Line art of the Kaiwo Maru

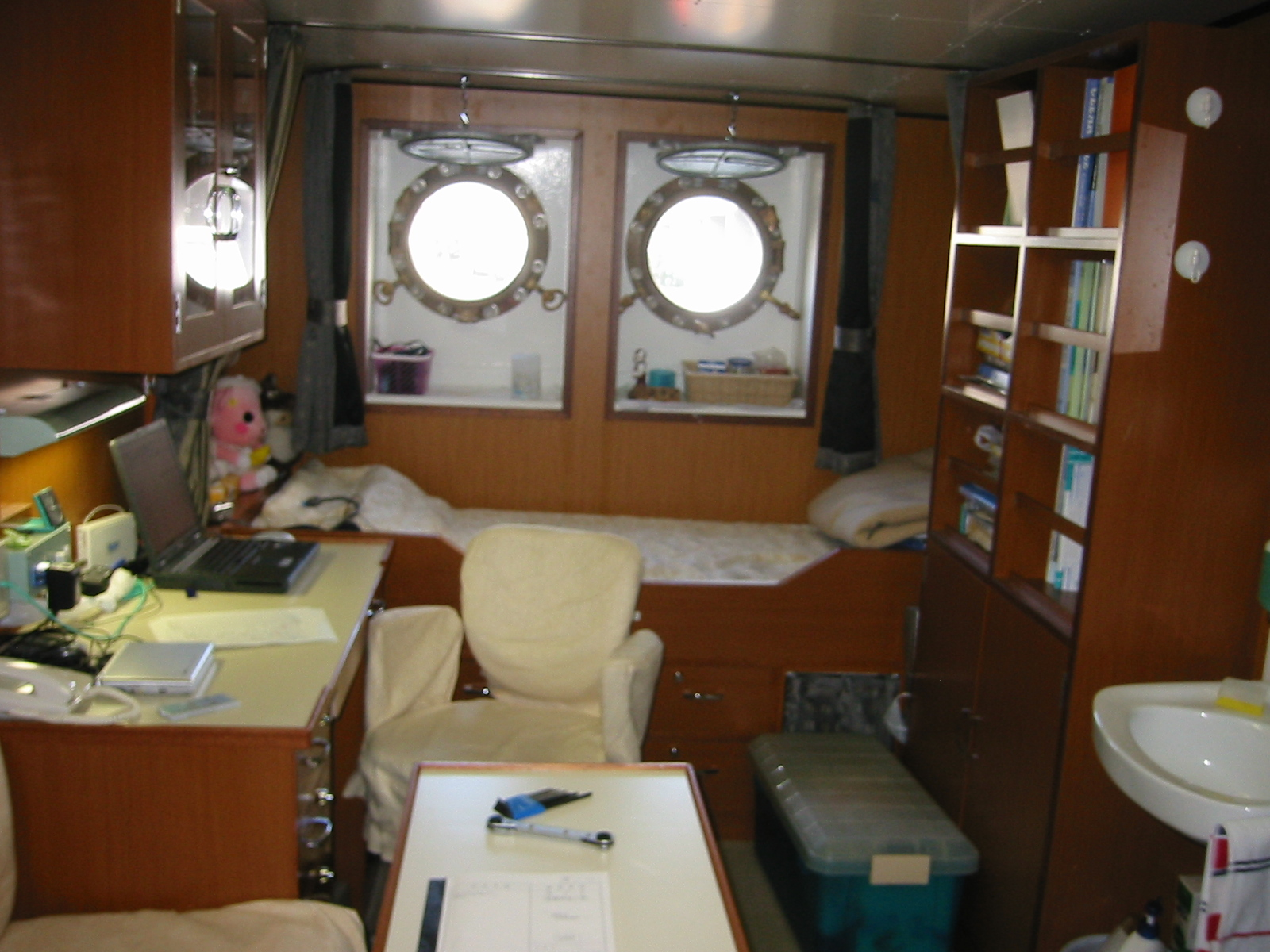
Officer's cabin aboard Kaiwo Maru

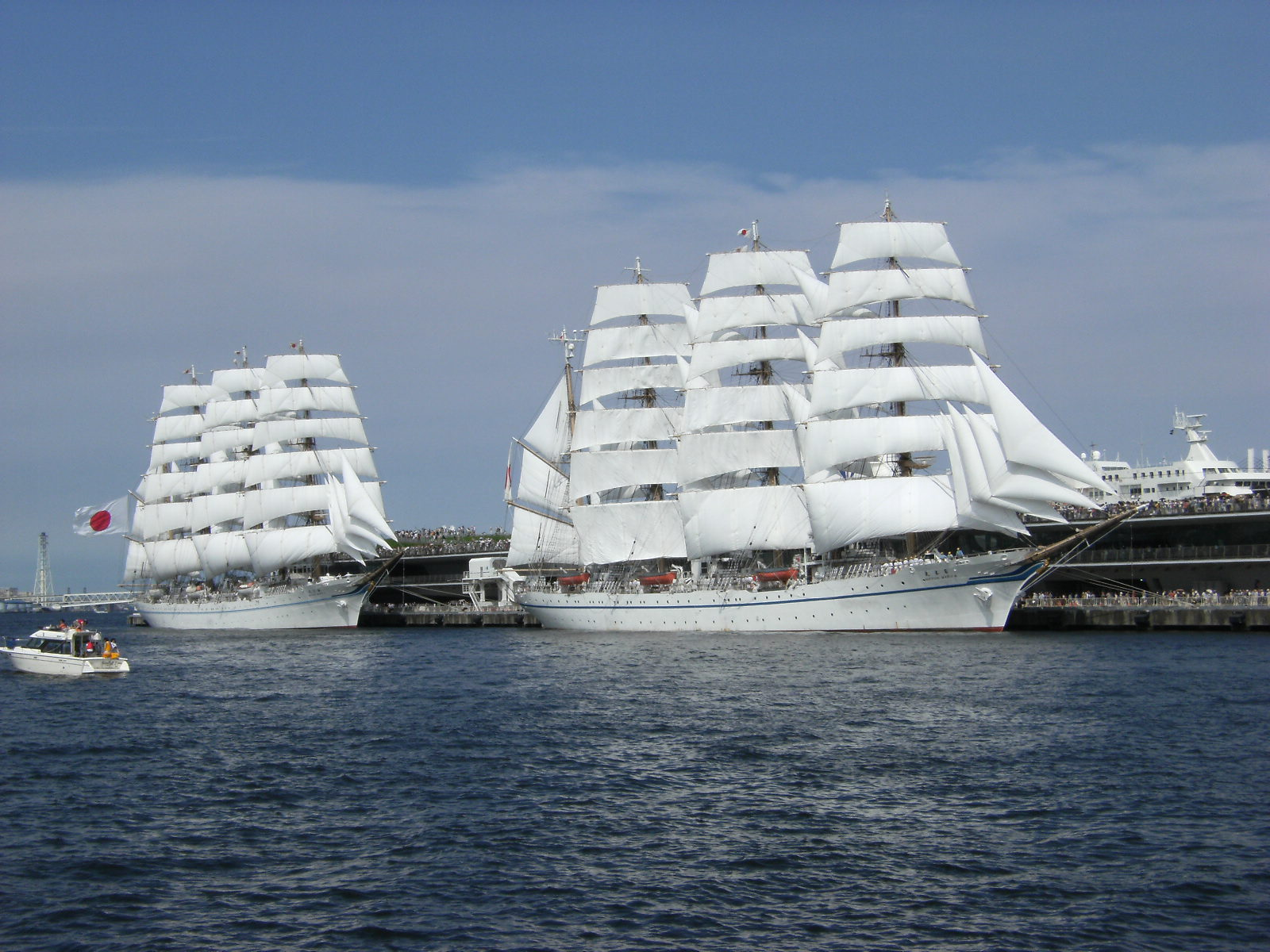
Kaiwo Maru with sister-ship Nippon Maru

== See also ==
- List of large sailing vessels
- JDS Kashima (TV-3508)
