= Nippon Maru (1984) =

Japanese training sailing ship

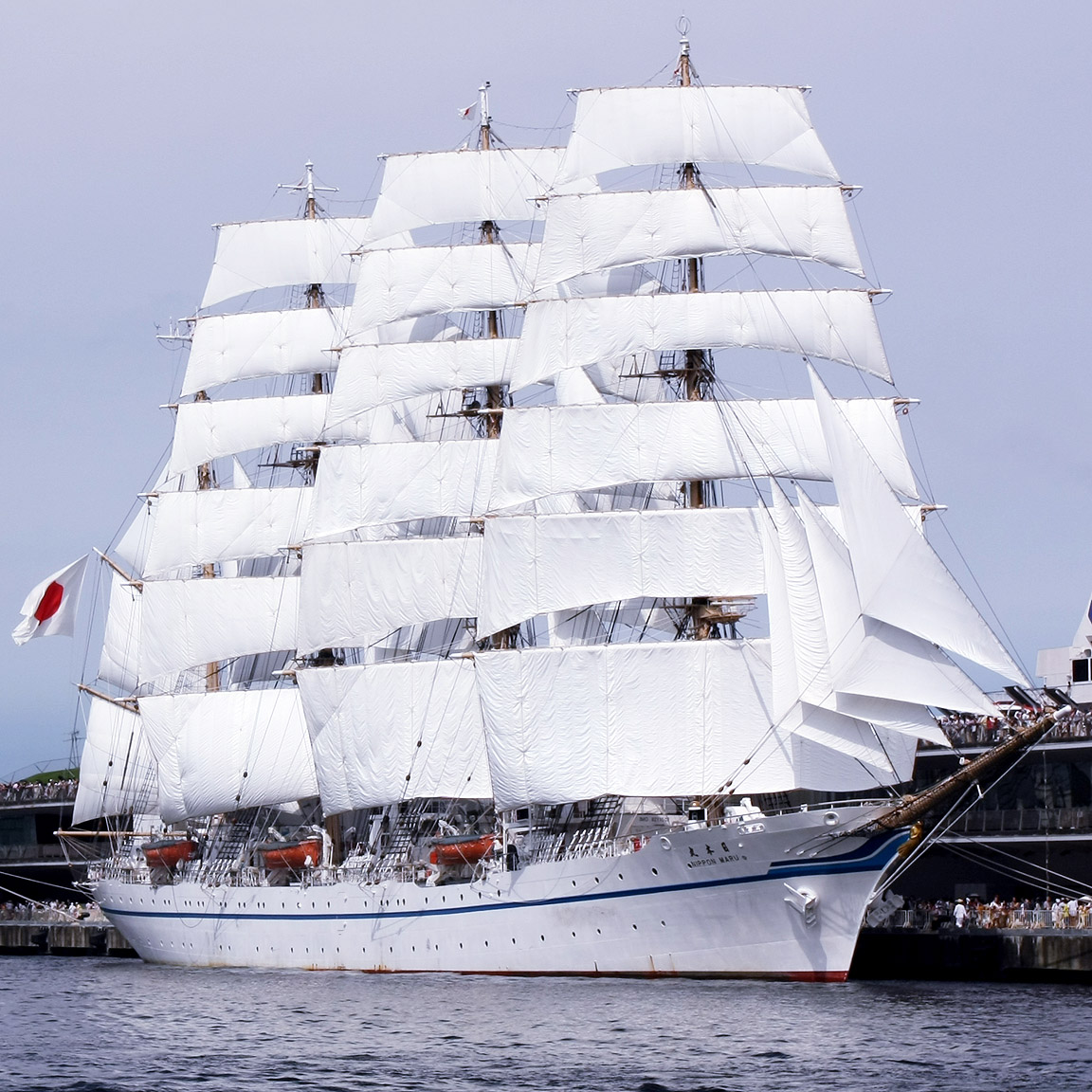
- Nippon Maru in Yokohama

History

Japan
- Name: Nippon Maru
- Owner: Japanese Government
- Operator: Agency of Maritime Education and Training for Seafarer (海技教育機構)
- Port of registry: Tokyo, Japan
- Builder: Sumitomo Heavy Industries
- Launched: 15 February 1984
- Completed: 16 September 1984
- Identification: IMO number: 8211502; MMSI number: 431498000; Callsign: JFMC
- Status: Operational

General characteristics
- Displacement: 1,456 DWT
- Length: 110.1 metres (361 ft)
- Beam: 13.8 metres (45 ft)
- Height: 55.5 metres (182 ft)
- Draught: 6.6 metres (22 ft)
- Installed power: 2 Daihatsu 6DSMB-28NS Diesel engines
- Sail plan: Four-masted Barque
- Complement: 190 (120 trainees)

Nippon Maru (日本丸) is a Japanese training sailing ship operated by the Japan Agency of Maritime Education and Training for Seafarer (JMETS) (海技教育機構) under the Ministry of Land, Infrastructure, Transport and Tourism (MLIT).

She was built by Sumitomo Heavy Industries in Uraga, Kanagawa, and was launched on 15 February 1984 with the then Crown Prince Akihito in attendance. She was commissioned by the former National Institute for Sea Training (NIST) (航海訓練所) on 16 September 1984. NIST was absorbed by MLIT and restructured as JMETS in 2016. She was built as a replacement for the 1930-built barque Nippon Maru.

Nippon Maru is 110.1 metres (361 ft) long, with a beam of 13.8 metres (45 ft) and a draft of 6.5 metres (21 ft). Her gross tonnage is 2,891. She is rigged as a four-masted barque, with 36 sails and a total sail area of 2,760 square metres (29,700 sq ft), and has two 1,500-horsepower diesel engines for auxiliary functions. She has a crew complement of 70, with a training complement of 120 trainees. She has won the Boston Teapot Trophy 3 times, the fastest a 1,201 nm run averaging 9.6 knots in 1993.
