= Italian training ship Corsaro II =

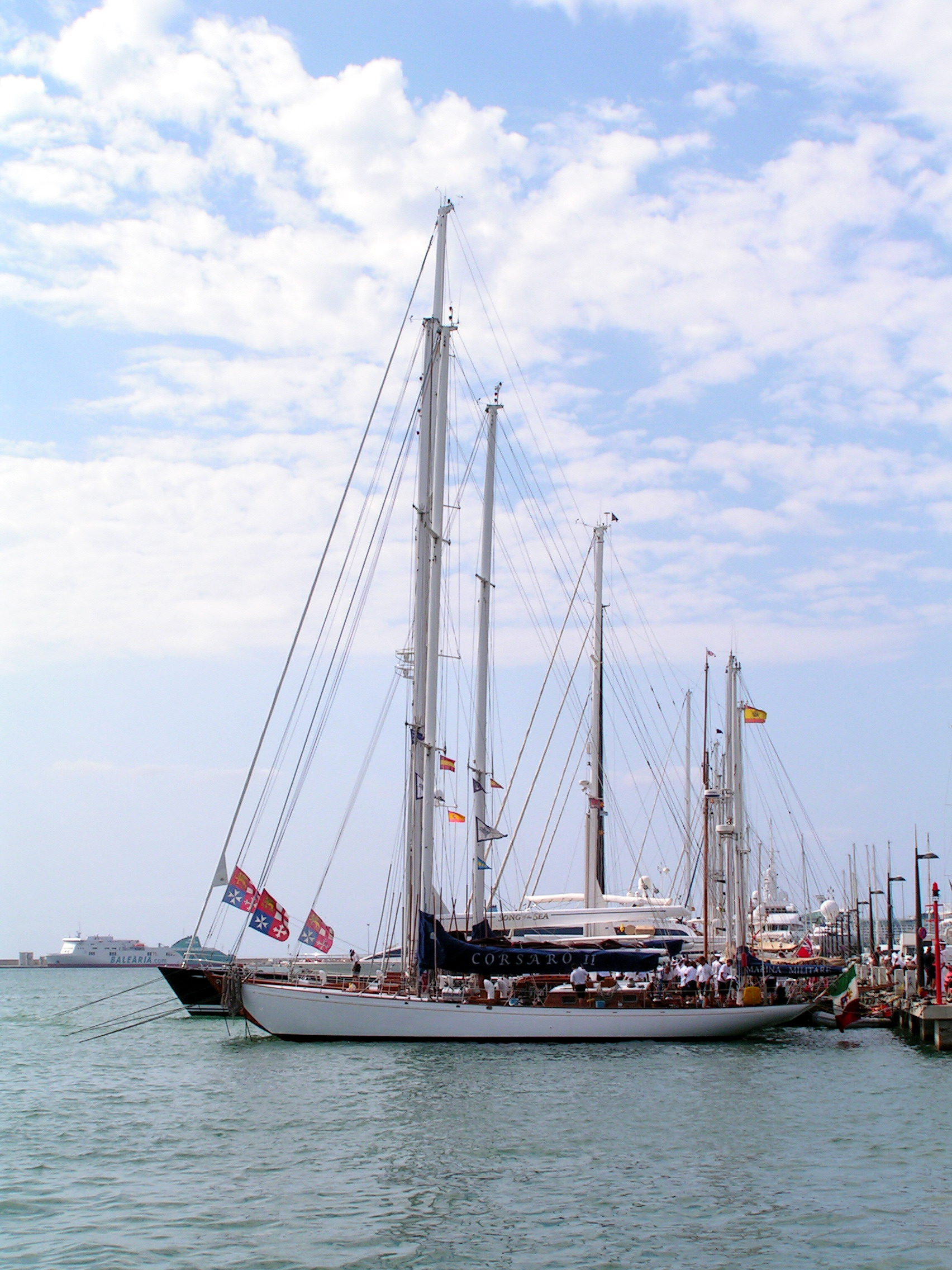
- Corsaro II at Palma de Mallorca in 2007

History
- Name: Corsaro II
- Operator: Italian Navy
- Builder: Cantiere Navale Costaguta Voltri, Genova, Italy
- Launched: 1960
- Commissioned: 5 January 1961
- In service: 1
- Home port: La Spezia
- Identification: ITA 1643 (Sail number)
- Status: in service
- Notes: Pennant number A 5316

General characteristics
- Type: Sail training ship
- Tonnage: 47 t (46 long tons) full load
- Length: 20.9 m (68 ft 7 in) LOA; 15.24 m (50.0 ft) LPP
- Beam: 4.7 m (15 ft 5 in)
- Height: 24.08 m (79 ft 0 in) main mast; 12.11 m (39 ft 9 in) mizzen mast
- Draught: 2.9 m (9 ft 6 in)
- Propulsion: 1 x diesel engine FIAT AIFO 71.59 kW (96.00 bhp); 1 shaft; 1 x diesel engine generator Fischer Panda
- Sail plan: - Sail surface 700 square metres (7,500 square feet); - Sail surface upwind 205 square metres (2,210 square feet)
- Speed: 7.0 knots (13.0 km/h; 8.1 mph) by engine prop
- Range: 500 nmi (930 km; 580 mi) at 7.0 knots (13.0 km/h; 8.1 mph) (on engine prop)
- Complement: 16

Corsaro II is a yawl, active as a sail training vessel for the Italian Navy

== Characteristics ==
Designed by Sparkman & Stephens Designs New York City (United States), project 1505, Corsano II for the RORC 1st class, is a Bermudan-rig yawl, sister of Stella Polare, commissioned by Italian Navy to be used as a training ship for the cadets at the Italian Naval Academy in Livorno, Italy. She is constructed of wood; iroko keelson, acacia frames and double planked of Philippine mahogany. The ship's fasteners are silicon bronze, spars are of sitka spruce. Original engine Mercedes-Benz OM/321 (96 HP) was then replaced by a FIAT AIFO engine.

Each year she embarks on a training cruise which often includes calls to various classic sailing rallies and regattas.

== History ==
Corsaro II can accommodate 16 persons. First Commander of the ship was Agostino Straulino, who won the 1952 Olympic Games in the class Star. In 1961 Corsaro II was the only naval ship to join in the Los Angeles – Honolulu classifying sixth in real time. In 1962 participated in the Newport – Bermuda with 138 boats arriving at the sixth place, and in the Torbay – Rotterdam arriving first in the class. In 1963 participated in: Annapolis – Newport, Newport – Plymouth (second place), the Channel Race and the Fastnet Race. In 1964 took part in the Lisbon – Canaries – Bermuda reaching the first place. In 1965 participated in the Buenos Aires – Rio de Janeiro then sailed to Sydney racing in local regatta. The following year sailed from Sydney to San Diego coming to Italy. From then on the Corsaro II participated mainly in the Mediterranean sea with home port in La Spezia.
