= Nippon Maru (1930) =

Ship

Coordinates: 35.4537°N 139.6323°E

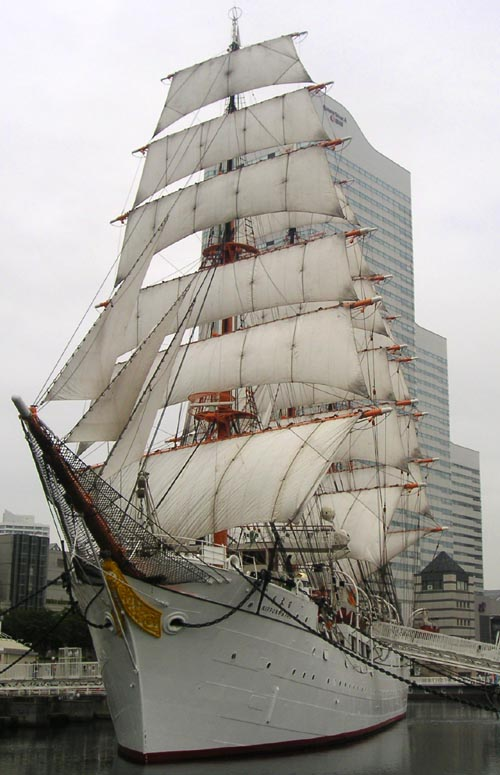
- Nippon Maru in Yokohama

Japanese name
- Kanji: 日本丸
- Hiragana: にっぽんまる
Transcriptions
- Romanization: Nippon Maru

Nippon Maru (日本丸) is a Japanese museum ship and former training vessel. She is permanently docked in Yokohama harbor, in Nippon Maru Memorial Park.

She was built by Kawasaki Shipbuilding Corporation in Kobe, and was launched on 27 January 1930 alongside her sister ship Kaiwo Maru. She was operated by the Tokyo Institute for Maritime Training to train officers for Japan's merchant marine. At the beginning of World War II, her sailing rig was removed and she served as a training and postwar transport motorship. In 1952, her rig was reinstalled and she resumed her training voyages until she was replaced in September 1984 by her successor, also named Nippon Maru.

Nippon Maru measures 97 metres (318 ft) long, with a beam of 12.95 metres (42.5 ft) and a draft of 6.90 metres (22.6 ft). Her gross tonnage is 2,286. She is rigged as a four-masted barque, with 32 sails covering 2,397 square metres (25,800 sq ft), and two 600-horsepower diesel engines for auxiliary functions. During her career as a training ship, she was manned by a crew of 27 officers, 48 seamen, and 120 trainees.

== Gallery ==
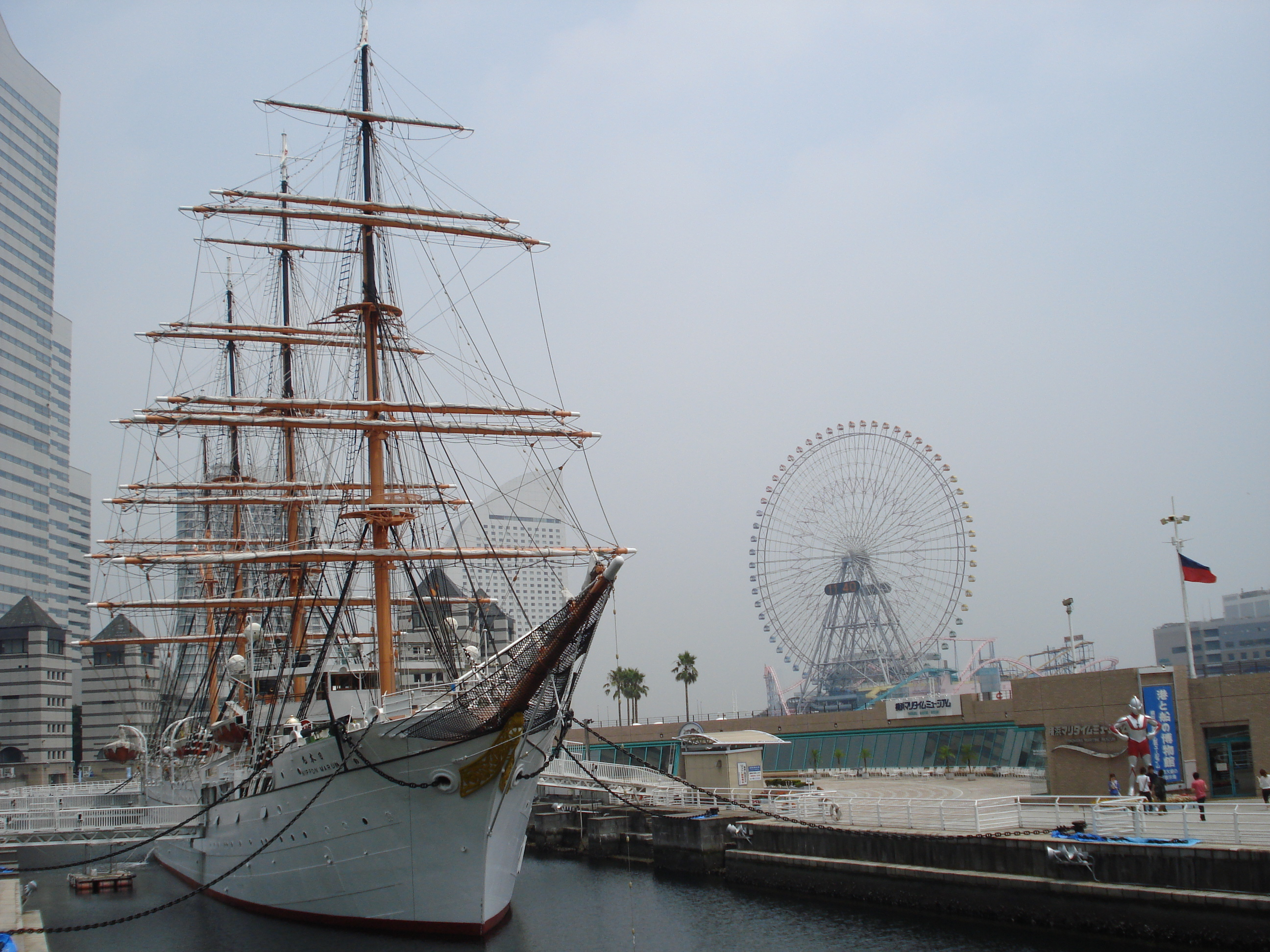
Nippon Maru in 2008

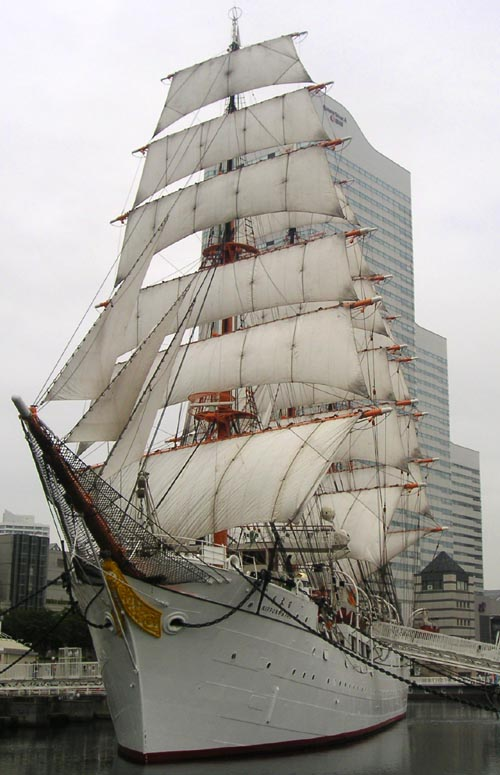
Nippon Maru in 2004

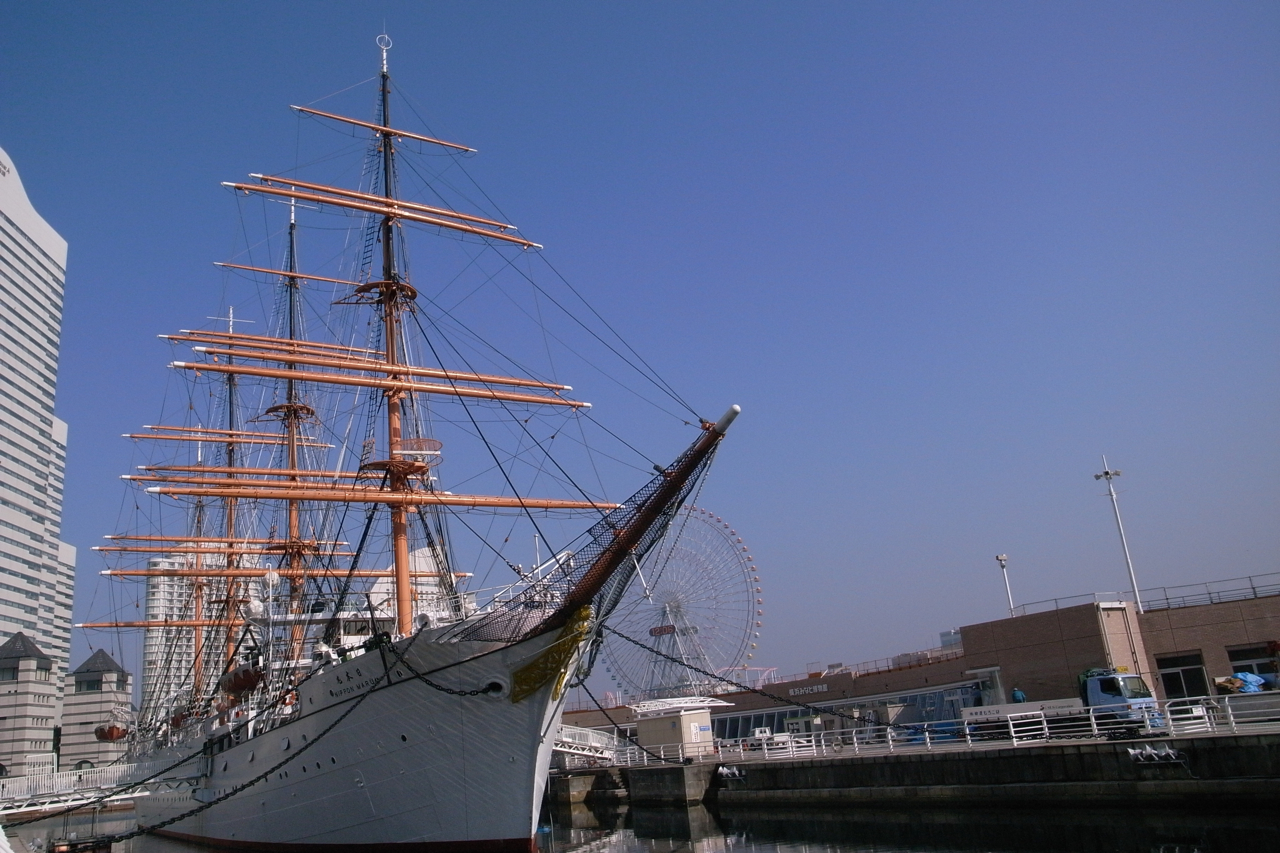
Nippon Maru in 2009

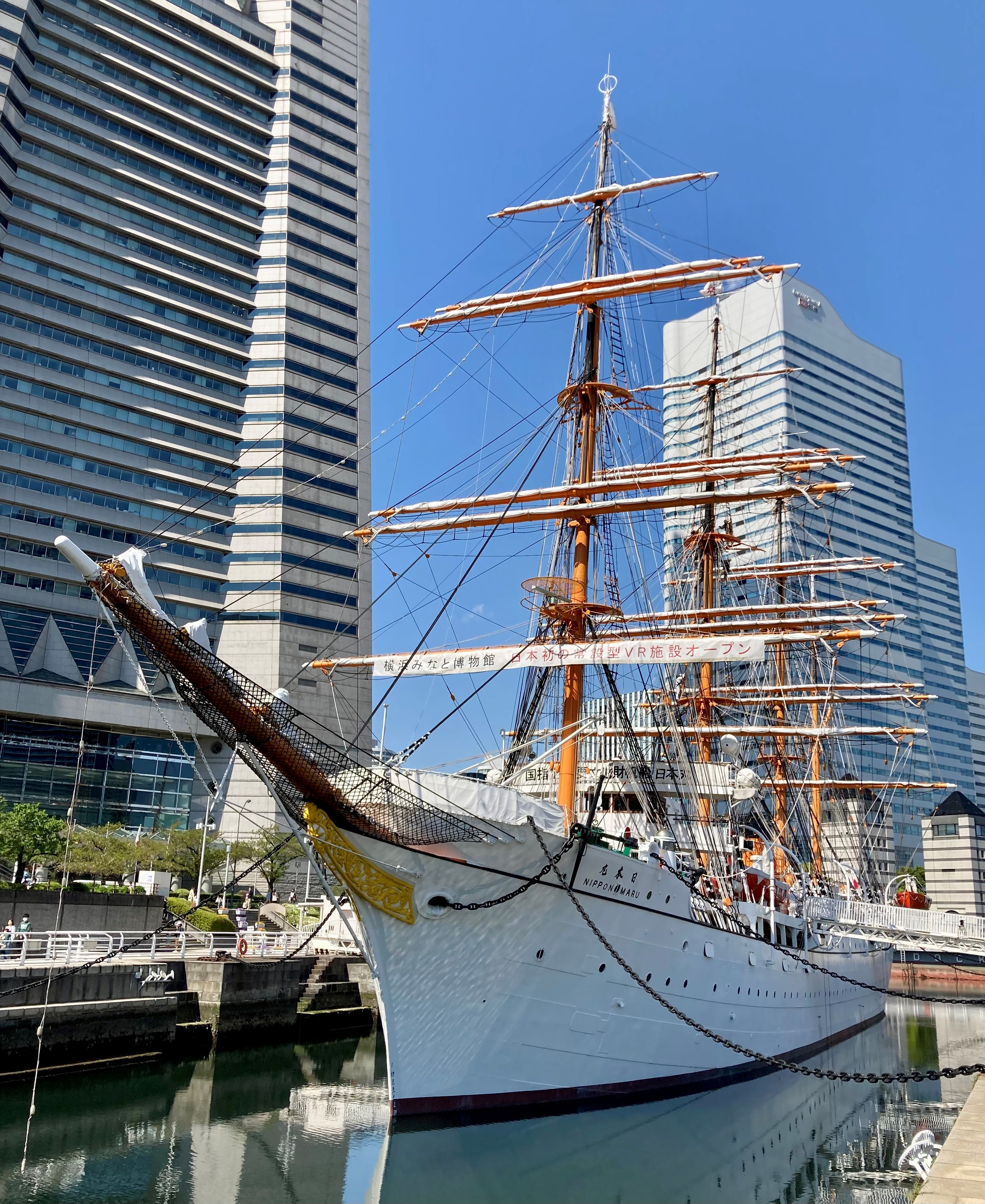
Nippon Maru in 2023

== Popular culture ==
The Nippon Maru appears and plays a key role most notably in the climax ending of Superior Ultraman 8 Brothers (2008) film, where in an alternate timeline, the 150-year-old ship monument had been turned into humanity's very first faster than light capable interstellar exploratory spaceship where everyone of the main cast makes their way to visit M78 Nebula, which so happens to be the homeworld of humanity's guardian protectors, the Ultra civilization.
