= Toyama National College of Technology =

National Institute of Technology, Toyama College
- 富山高等専門学校
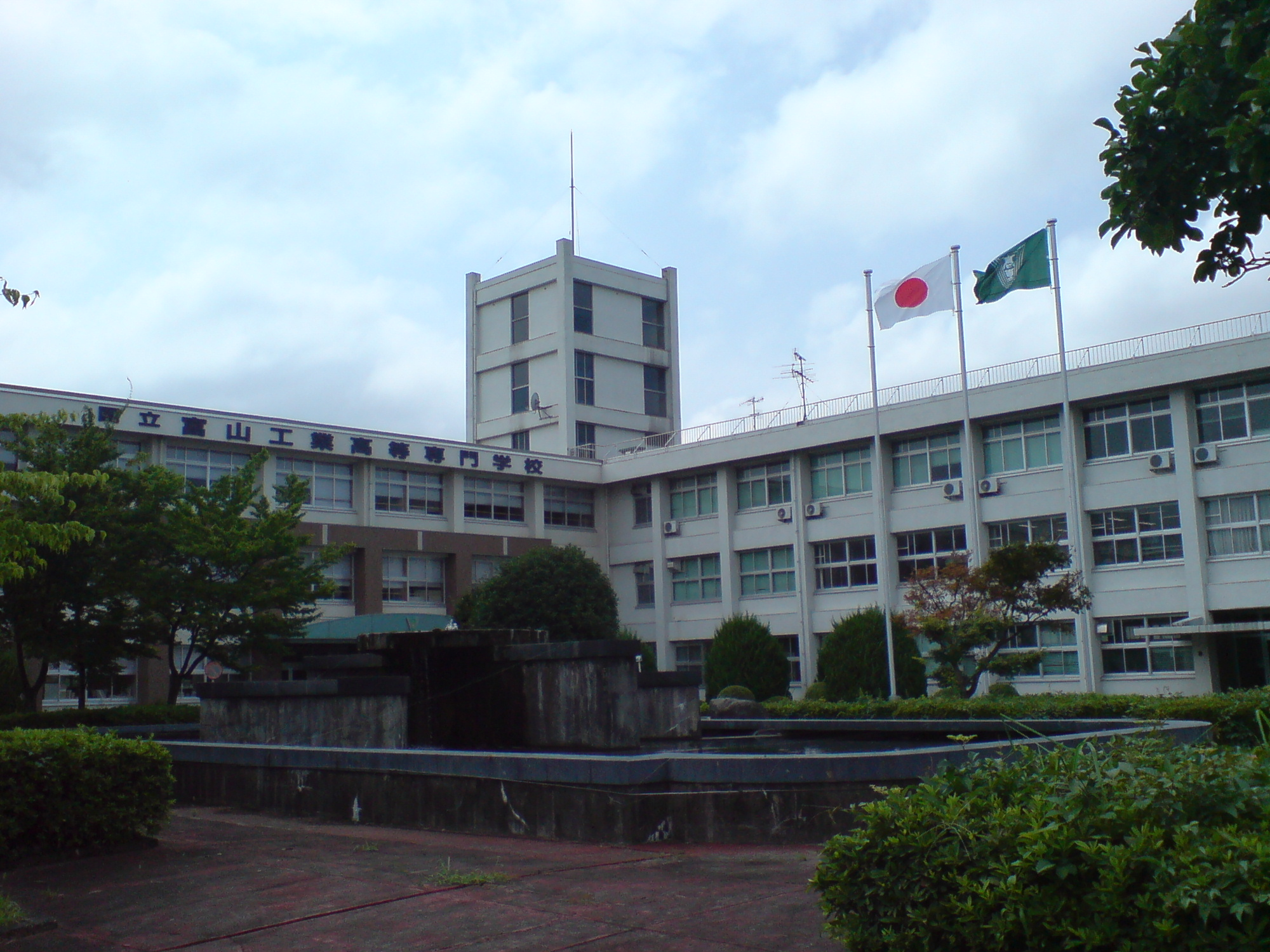
- National Institute of Technology, Toyama College
- Established: 2009
- Location: Toyama, Toyama Prefecture, Japan
- Campus: Hongō Campus 36°39′03″N 137°14′38″E Imizu Campus 36°45′32″N 137°9′32″E
- Website: www.nc-toyama.ac.jp/c5/index.php/e/

Toyama National College of Technology (富山高等専門学校, Toyama Kōtōsenmongakkō) is a college of technology in Toyama and Imizu, Toyama Prefecture, Japan. In 2014, the school changed the name into National Institute of Technology, Toyama College. It was formed on 1 October 2009 after a merger between the old Toyama National College of Technology (富山工業高等専門学校, Toyama Kōgyō Kōtōsenmongakkō) (founded in 1964) in Toyama, and Toyama National College of Maritime Technology (founded in 1906) in Imizu. They are called the Hongo Campus and Imizu Campus respectively.

== Courses ==
The college offers a five-year education program for students who have completed junior high school education.

== Departments ==
The college has six departments, covering engineering, humanities and social sciences, and maritime engineering.

Engineering

- Department of Mechanical Engineering
- Department of Electrical and Control Systems Engineering
- Department of Applied Chemistry and Chemical Engineering
- Department of Electronics and Computer Engineering

Humanities and social sciences

- Department of International Business

Maritime engineering

- Department of Maritime Technology
