= Kosugi, Toyama =

Kosugi, Toyama 小杉町
- Flag Emblem

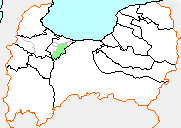
- Country: Japan
- Prefecture: Toyama
- District: Imizu

Kosugi (小杉町, Kosugi-machi) was a town located in Imizu District, Toyama Prefecture, Japan.

In 2003, the town had an estimated population of 32,770 and a population density of 795.00 per square kilometre (2,059.0/sq mi). The total area was 41.22 square kilometres (15.92 sq mi).

On November 1, 2005, Kosugi, along with the city of Shinminato, the towns of Daimon and Ōshima, the village of Shimo (all from Imizu District), was merged to create the city of Imizu and no longer exists as an independent municipality.
