= Kaiwo Maru (1930) =

Japanese training ship

Coordinates: 36.780125°N 137.110090°E

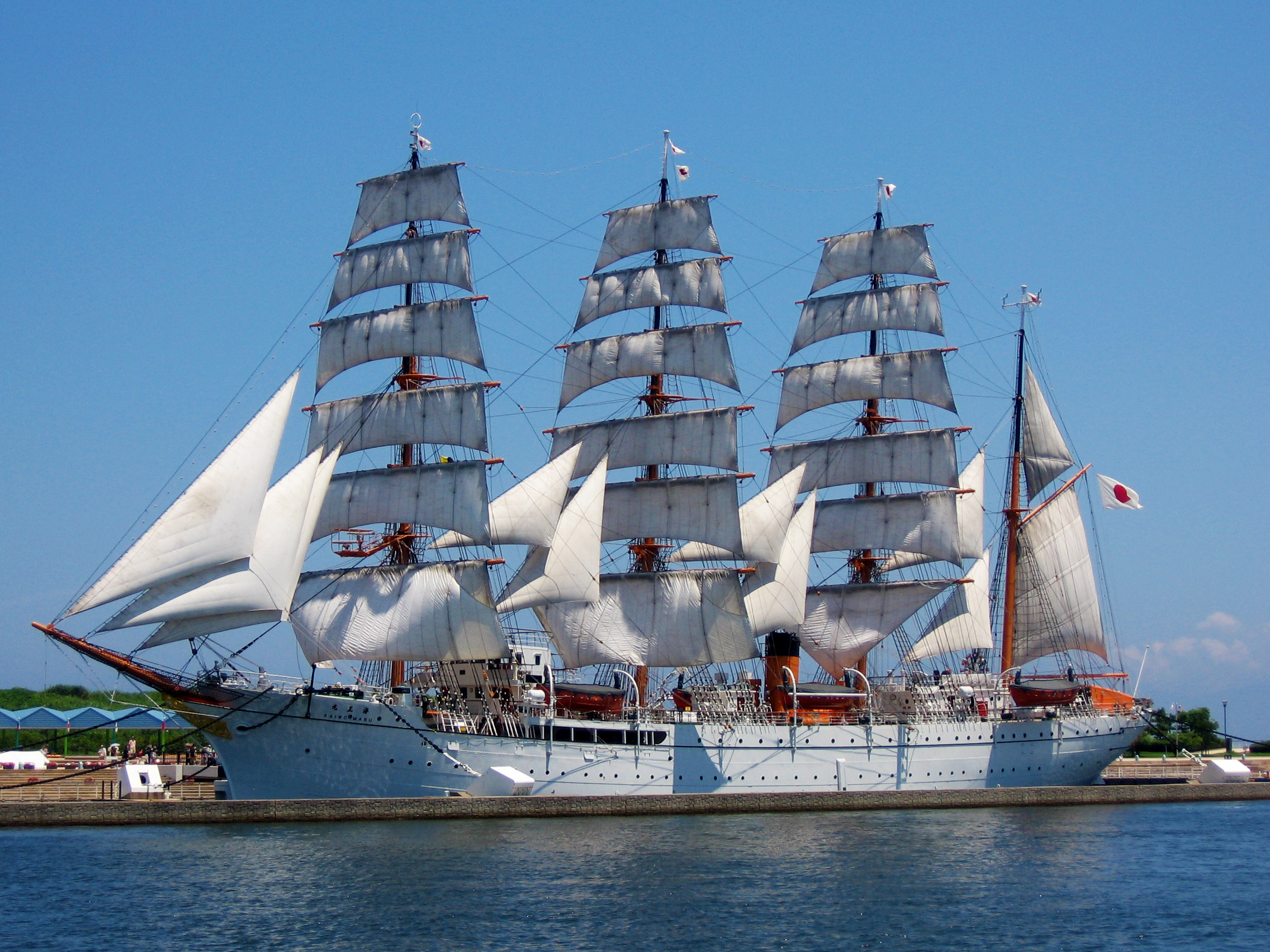
Kaiwo Maru

Kaiwo Maru (海王丸) is a Japanese former training barque. She was built by Kawasaki Shipbuilding Corporation in Kobe, and was launched on 27 January 1930 alongside her sister ship Nippon Maru. She was operated by the Tokyo Institute for Maritime Training to train officers for Japan's merchant marine. At the beginning of World War II, her sailing rig was removed and she served as a training and postwar transport motorship. In 1955, her rig was reinstalled and she resumed her training voyages until she was replaced in 1989 by her successor, also named Kaiwo Maru. In August 1955 the ship was filmed by Mike Todd for the movie Around the World in 80 Days. She is now a museum ship located in Imizu, Toyama.

Kaiwo Maru measures 97 metres (318 ft) long, with a beam of 12.95 metres (42.5 ft) and a draft of 6.90 metres (22.6 ft). Her gross tonnage is 2,286. She is rigged as a four-masted barque, with 32 sails covering 2,397 square metres (25,800 sq ft), and two 600-horsepower diesel engines for auxiliary functions. During her career as a training ship, she was crewed by a complement of 27 officers, 48 sailors, and 120 trainees.

Today the ship is on static display. Trained local volunteers unfurl the sails several times a year, usually on public holidays.
