= Belles Montagnes et Mer =

Japanese limited express train service

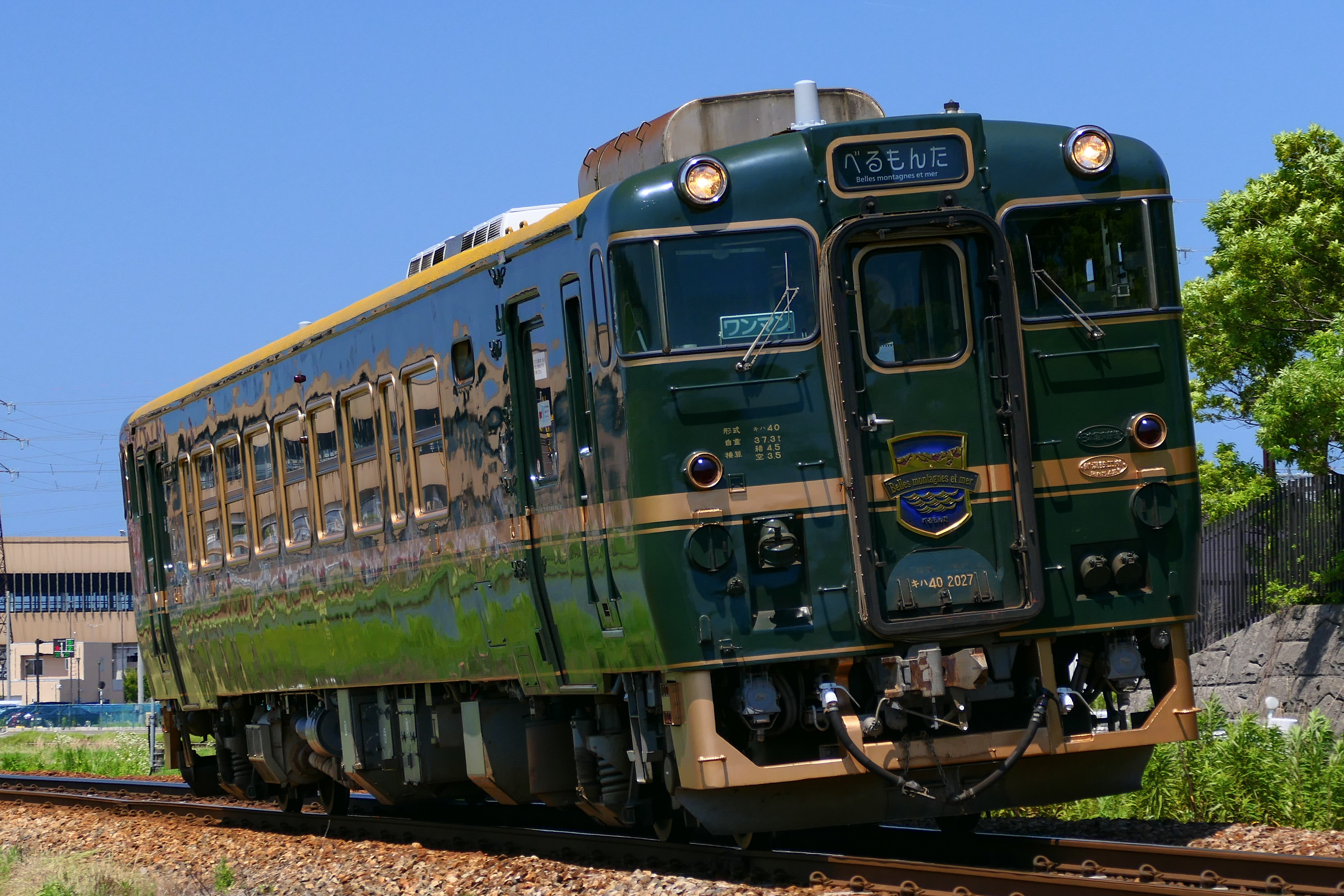
- The Belles Montagnes et Mer traveling between Shin-Takaoka and Futatsuka

Overview
- Service type: Limited express
- Status: Operational
- Locale: Toyama, Japan
- First service: 10 October 2015
- Current operator: JR West

Route
- Termini: Himi; Jōhana
- Lines used: Himi Line, Jōhana Line

Technical
- Rolling stock: KiHa 40 series DMU
- Track gauge: 1,067 mm (3 ft 6 in)
- Electrification: None

The Belles Montagnes et Mer (ベル・モンターニュ・エ・メール, Beru monta-nyu e meru) is a limited express sightseeing train service operated by the West Japan Railway Company (JR West) in Toyama, Japan.

== Overview ==
The name of the service means 'beautiful mountains and sea' in French, on account of the line running from Takaoka past mountains and along the Sea of Japan. The service is officially nicknamed Berumonta (べるもんた) by JR West.

== Operation status ==
The Belles Montagnes et Mer started operations in October 10, 2015 as a sightseeing train running between Himi and Jōhana in Toyama.

The service mainly runs on Saturdays and Sundays; round trips depart and arrive at Jōhana on Saturdays, and Himi on Sundays. The Jōhana service runs through the mountains while the Himi service runs along the coast of the Sea of Japan.

== Rolling stock ==
The Berumonta uses vehicles converted from KiHa 40 series DMUs (KiHa 40 2027). Only one carriage is used to carry passengers per service.

== Gallery ==
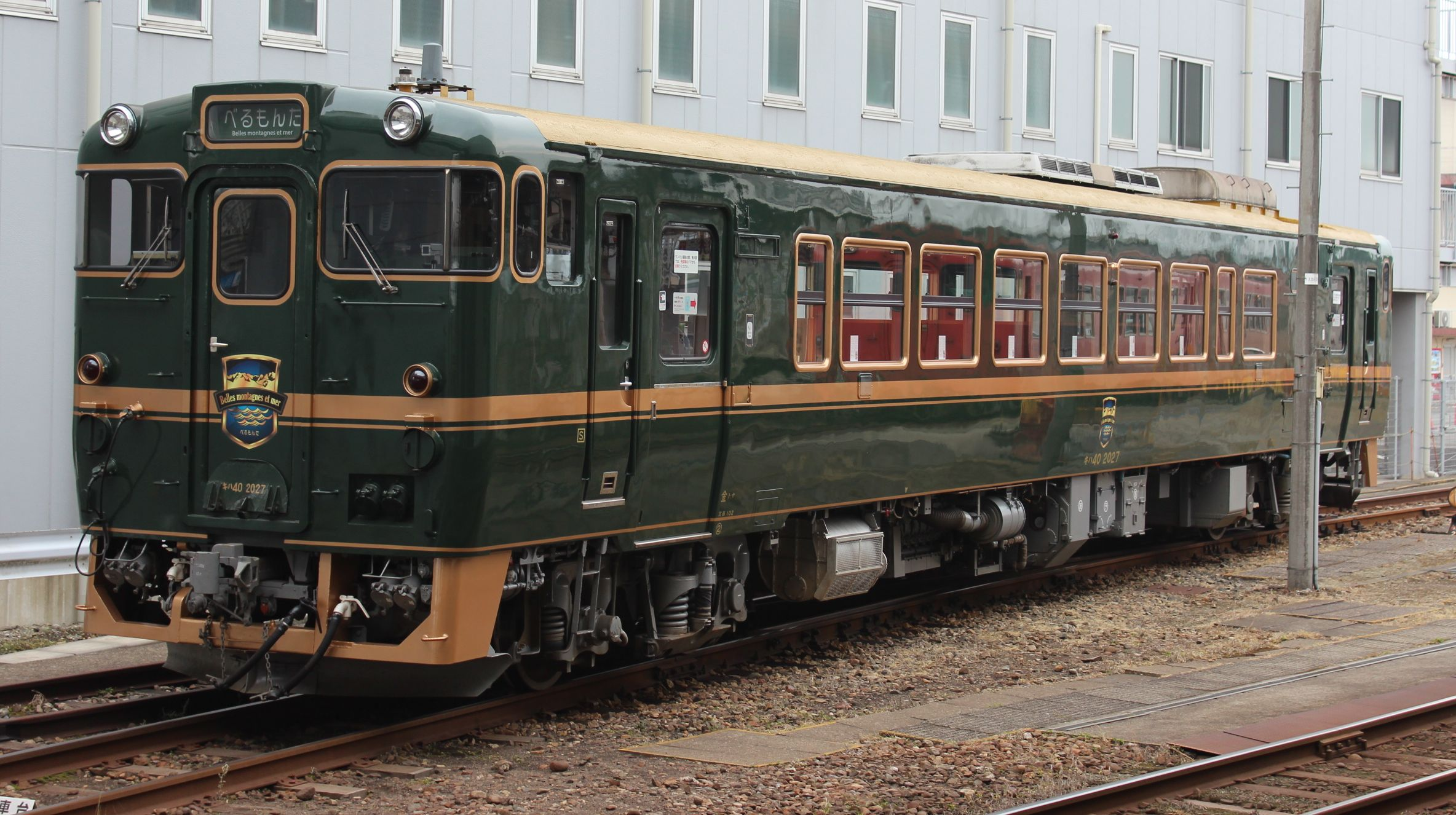
Exterior of the Berumonta

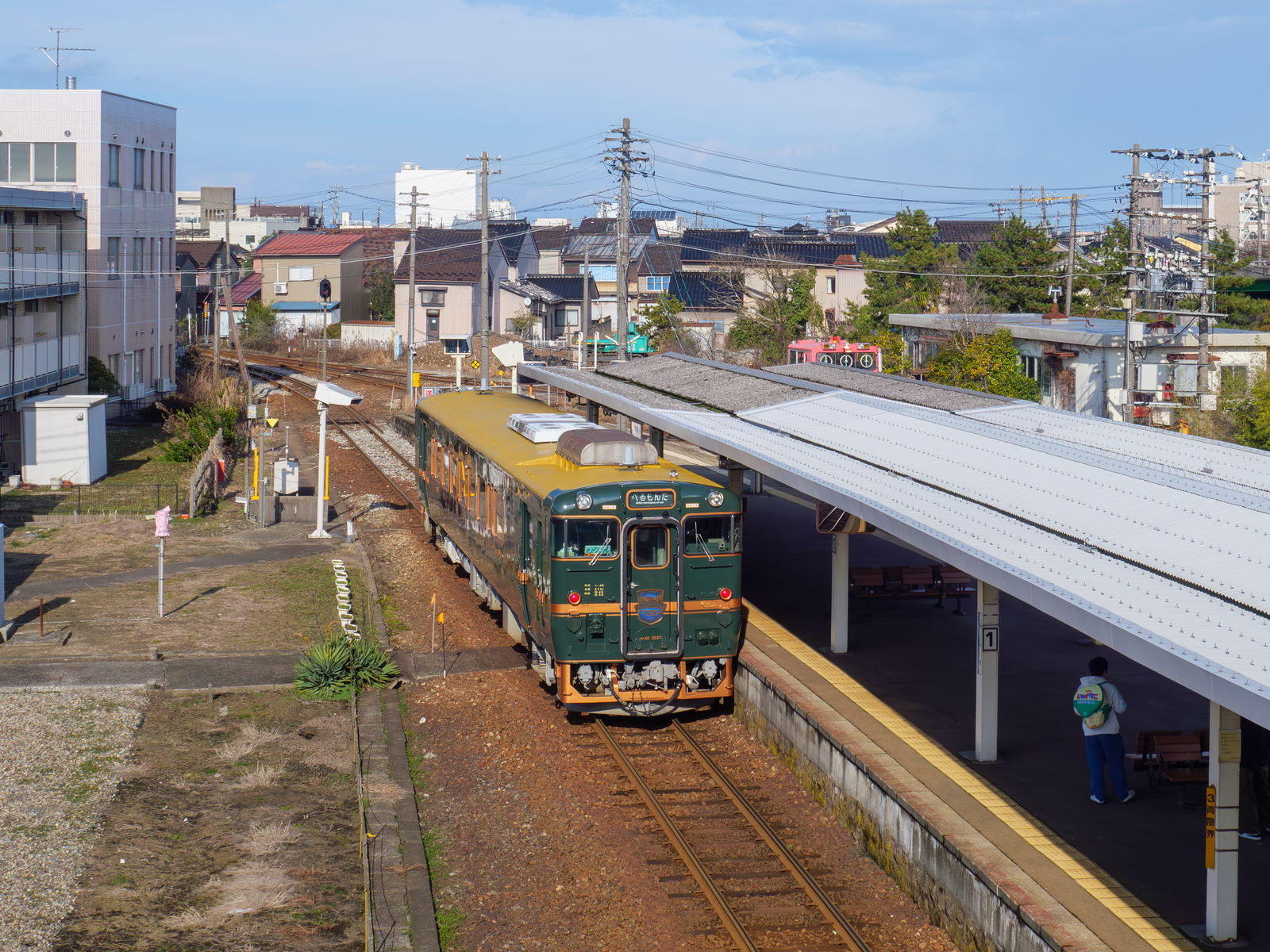
The train as viewed from Fushiki Station

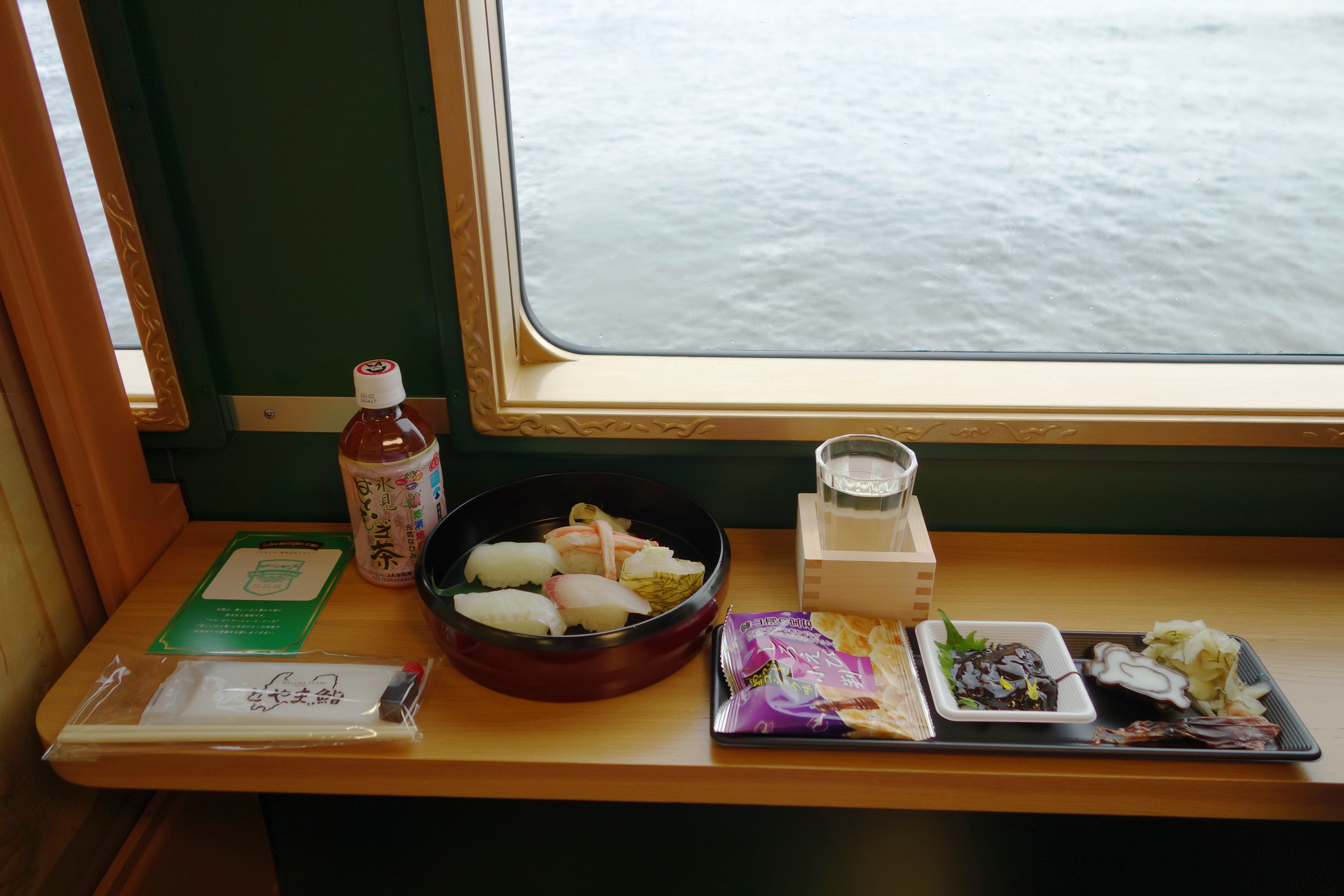
Sushi meal and alcohol sold on the train
