= Etchū-Kokubu Station =

Railway station in Takaoka, Toyama Prefecture, Japan

Etchū-Kokubu Station 越中国分駅
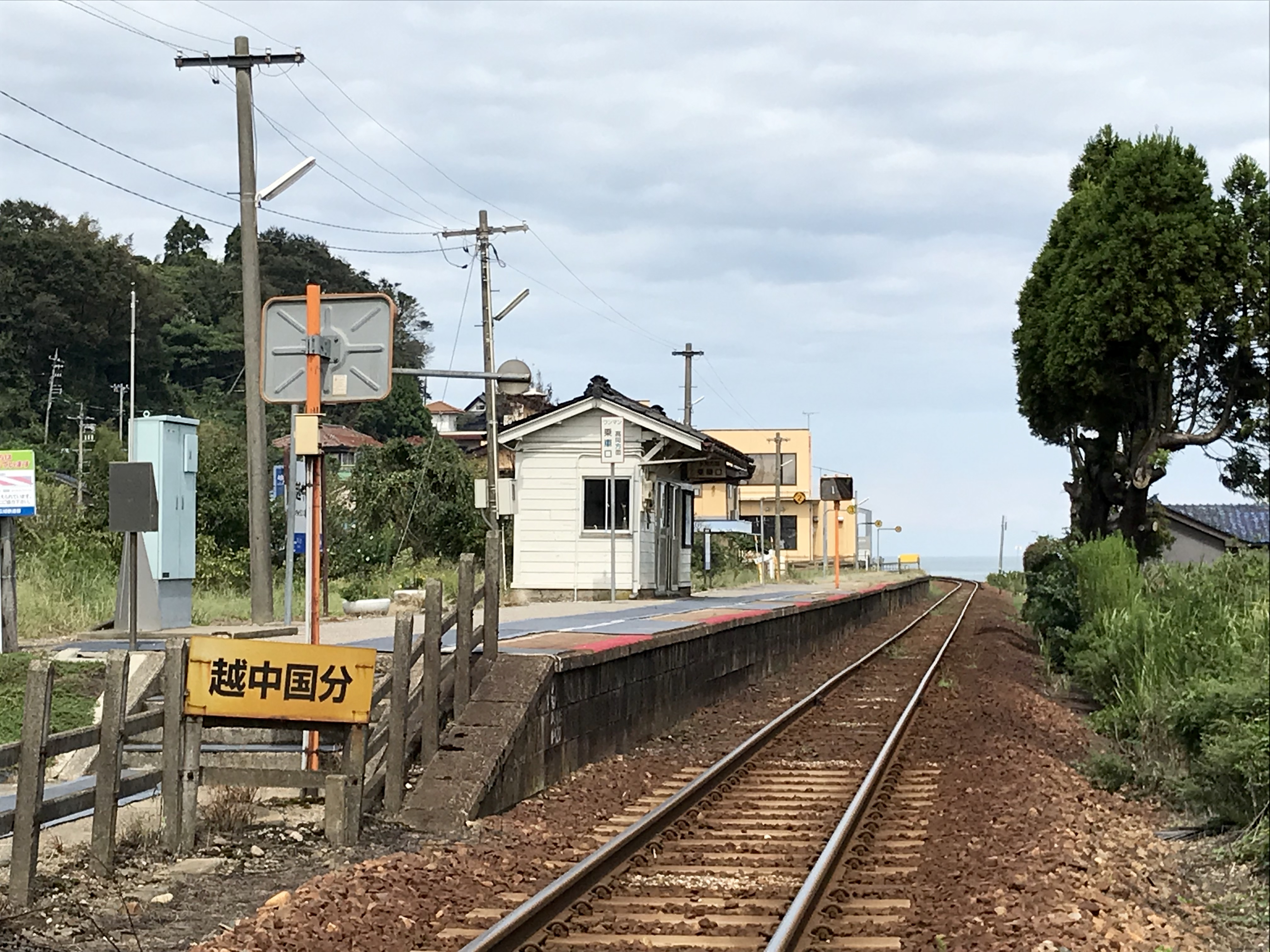
- Etchū-Kokubu Station in September 2018

General information
- Location: Fushihikokubu, Takaoka-shi, Toyama-ken 933-0101; Japan
- Coordinates: 36.8055°N 137.0506°E
- Operator: JR West
- Line: ■ Himi Line
- Distance: 9.0 km from Takaoka
- Platforms: 1 side platform
- Tracks: 1

Construction
- Structure type: At grade

Other information
- Status: unstaffed
- Website: Official website

History
- Opened: July 1, 1953

Passengers
- FY2015: 280 daily
Location
- Location within Japan

Etchū-Kokubu Station (越中国分駅, Etchū-Kokubu-eki) is a train station in the city of Takaoka, Toyama Prefecture, Japan. It is the newest station of the Himi Line operated by West Japan Railway Company.

== Lines ==
Etchū-Kokubu Station is a station on the Himi Line, and is located 9.0 kilometers from the opposing end of the line at Takaoka.

== Layout ==
Etchū-Kokubu Station consists of a single ground-level side platform, serving a single bi-directional track. The station is unattended.

The station is an unstaffed station with one side platform serving one track.

== History ==
Etchū-Kokubu Station was opened on July 1, 1953. With the privatization of the JNR on April 1, 1987, the station came under the control of the West Japan Railway Company.

== Adjacent stations ==
«	Service	»
Himi Line
Fushiki	-	Amaharashi

== Passenger statistics ==
In fiscal 2015, the station was used by an average of 280 passengers daily (boarding passengers only).

Data for previous years is as follows:

Year	Passengers
2004	345
2005	314
2006	289
2007	272
2008	268
2009	249
2010	246
2011	248

== Surrounding area ==
Between this station and neighbouring Amaharashi Station there are views on the right-hand side when heading towards Himi Station. These include views of the reefs of Otokoiwa, Onnaiwa and Yoshitsuneiwa located in the Sea of Japan. The surrounding area also contains Toyoma-ken Ritsushiki Senior High School, Japan National Route 415 and Koshi no Niwa onsen.
