= Amaharashi Station =

Railway station in Takaoka, Toyama Prefecture, Japan

Amaharashi Station 雨晴駅
- Amaharashi Station in July 2026

General information
- Location: 105 Shibuya, Takaoka-shi, Toyama-ken 933-0133; Japan
- Coordinates: 36°49′00″N 137°02′15″E
- Operator: JR West
- Line: ■ Himi Line
- Distance: 10.9 km from Takaoka
- Platforms: 2 side platforms
- Tracks: 2

Construction
- Structure type: At grade

Other information
- Status: Staffed
- Website: Official website

History
- Opened: 5 April 1912

Passengers
- FY2015: 67 daily
Location
- Location within Japan

Amaharashi Station (雨晴駅, Amaharashi-eki) is a railway station on the Himi Line in the city of Takaoka in Toyama Prefecture, Japan, operated by West Japan Railway Company (JR West).

== Lines ==
Amaharashi Station is a station on the Himi Line, and is located 10.9 kilometers from the opposing end of the line at Takaoka.

== Station layout ==
Amaharashi Station consists of two opposed ground-level side platforms, connected by a level crossing. The station is staffed.

=== Platforms ===
1	■ Himi Line	for Himi
2	■ Himi Line	for Takaoka

== Adjacent stations ==
«	Service	»
Himi Line
Etchū-Kokubu	-	Shimao

== History ==
Amaharashi Station was opened on April 5, 1912. With the privatization of the JNR on April 1, 1987, the station came under the control of the West Japan Railway Company. A new station building was completed in February 2009.

== Passenger statistics ==
In fiscal 2015, the station was used by an average of 67 passengers daily (boarding passengers only).

== Surrounding area ==
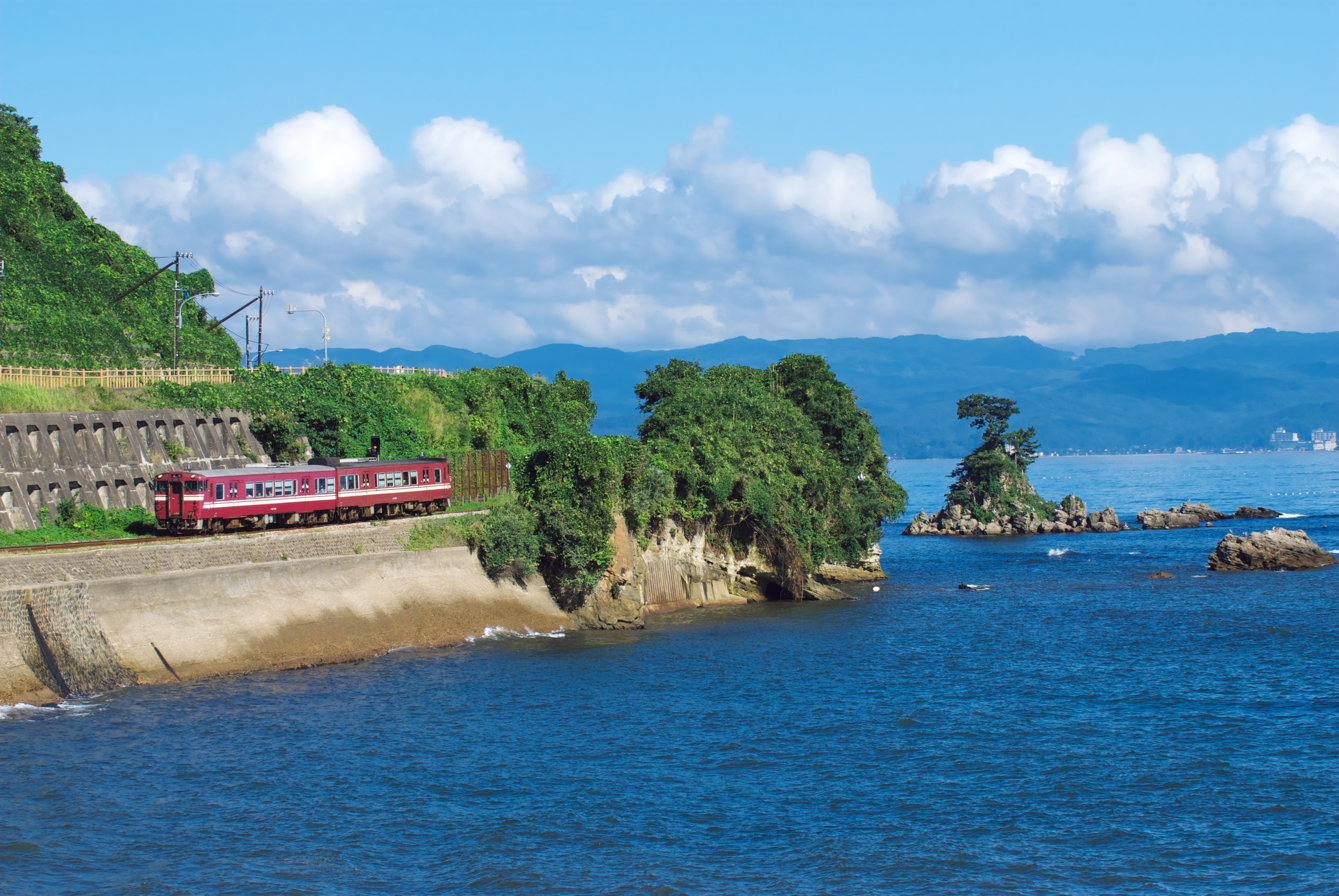
The Himi Line along the Amaharashi coast

- Amaharashi coast
- Amaharashi seaside resort
- National Route 415

== See also ==
- List of railway stations in Japan
