= Shimao Station =

Railway station in Himi, Toyama Prefecture, Japan

Shimao Station 島尾駅
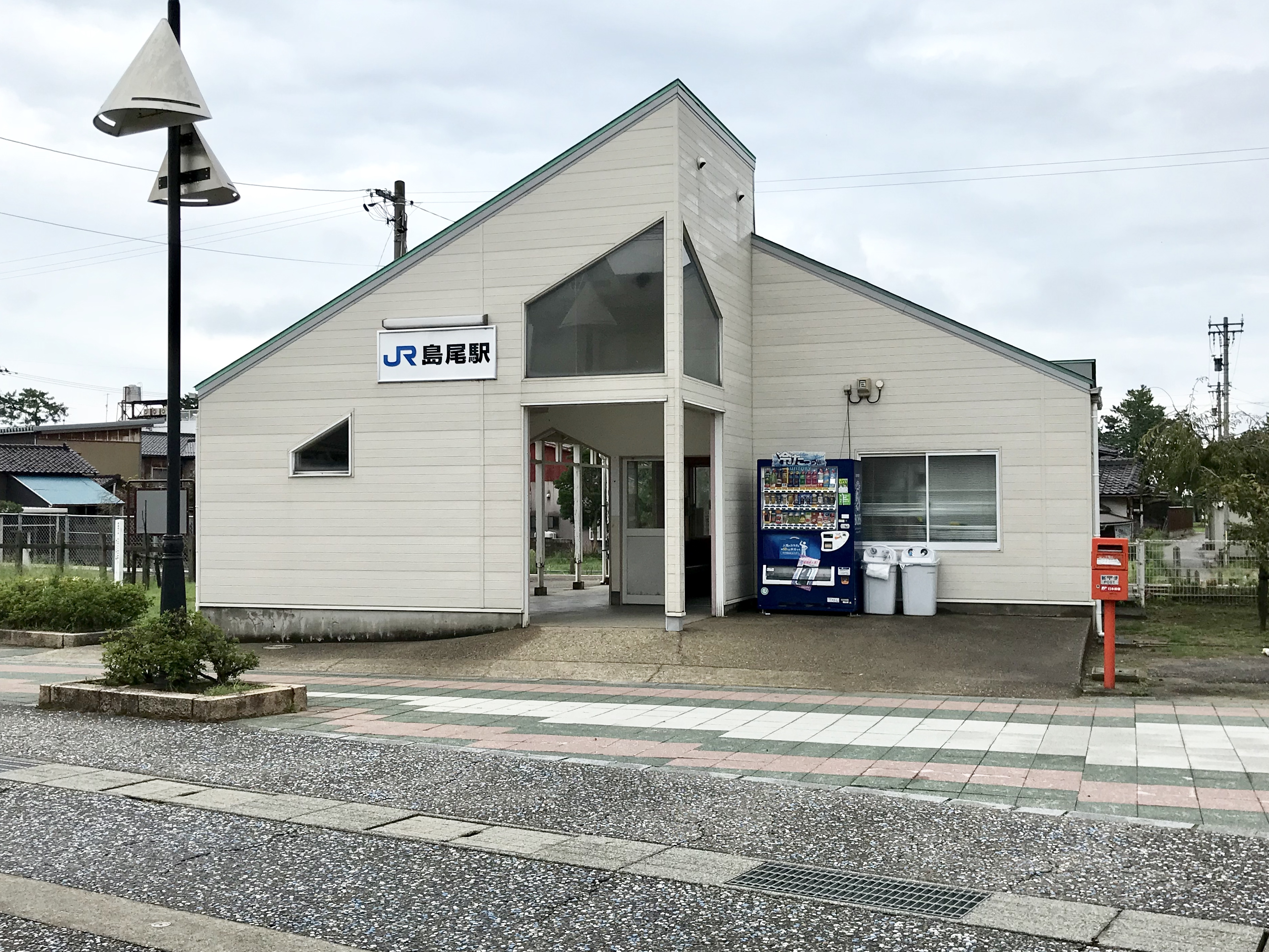
- Shimao Station in September 2018

General information
- Location: 2015 Shimao, Himi-shi, Toyama-ken 935-0032; Japan
- Coordinates: 36.8283°N 137.0127°E
- Operator: JR West
- Line: ■ Himi Line
- Distance: 13.5 km from Takaoka
- Platforms: 1 side platform
- Tracks: 1

Construction
- Structure type: At grade

Other information
- Status: unstaffed
- Website: Official website

History
- Opened: 5 April 1912

Passengers
- FY2015: 197 daily
Location
- Location within Japan

Shimao Station (島尾駅, Shimao-eki) is a railway station on the Himi Line in the city of Himi in Toyama Prefecture, Japan, operated by West Japan Railway Company (JR West).

== Lines ==
Shimao Station is a station on the Himi Line, and is located 13.5 kilometers from the opposing end of the line at Takaoka.

== Station layout ==
Shimao Station consists of a single ground-level side platform, serving a single bi-directional track. The station is unattended.

== Adjacent stations ==
«	Service	»
Himi Line
Amaharashi	-	Himi

== History ==
Shimao Station was opened on April 5, 1912. With the privatization of the JNR on April 1, 1987, the station came under the control of the West Japan Railway Company. A new station building was completed in February 2009.

== Passenger statistics ==
In fiscal 2015, the station was used by an average of 197 passengers daily (boarding passengers only).

== Surrounding area ==
- National Route 415
- Shimao Post Office
- Shimao Swimming Beach

== See also ==
- List of railway stations in Japan
