= Nōmachi Station =

Railway station in Takaoka, Toyama Prefecture, Japan

Nōmachi Station 能町駅
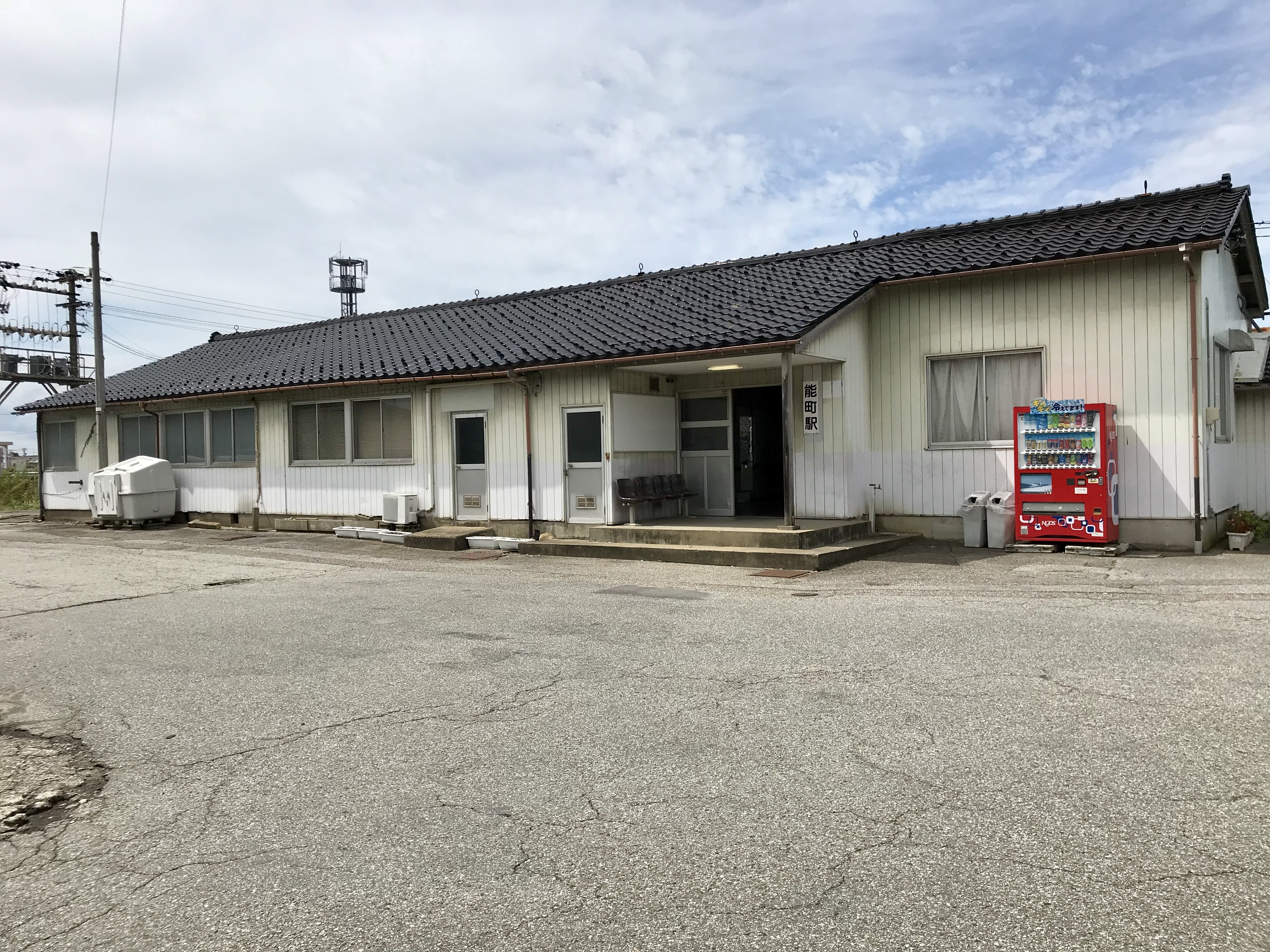
- Nōmachi Station in September 2018

General information
- Location: 1438 Nōmachi, Takaoka-shi, Toyama-ken; Japan
- Coordinates: 36°46′7.80″N 137°2′24.62″E
- Operator: JR West; JR Freight
- Line: ■ Himi Line
- Distance: 4.1 km from Takaoka
- Platforms: 1 island platform
- Tracks: 2

Construction
- Structure type: At grade

Other information
- Status: Unstaffed
- Website: Official website

History
- Opened: 29 December 1900

Passengers
- FY2015: 201 (daily)
Location
- Location within Japan

Nōmachi Station (能町駅, Nōmachi-eki) is a railway station on the Himi Line in Takaoka, Toyama Prefecture, Japan, operated by West Japan Railway Company (JR West).

== Lines ==
Nōmachi Station is served by the Himi Line, and is located 4.1 kilometers from the opposing end of the line at Takaoka. The station also has a freight terminal for the Japan Freight Railway Company's Shinminato Line.

== Station layout ==
The station has a single island platform, serving two tracks, connected by a level crossing. The station is unattended.

=== Platforms ===
station side	■ Himi Line	for Takaoka
opposite side	■ Himi Line	for Himi

== Adjacent stations ==
«	Service	»
Himi Line
Etchū-Nakagawa	-	Fushiki
Shinminato Line
Terminus	-	Takaoka Freight Terminal

== History ==
The station opened on 29 December 1900. With the privatization of Japanese National Railways (JNR) on 1 April 1987, the station came under the control of JR West.

== Passenger statistics ==
In fiscal 2015, the station was used by an average of 201 passengers daily (boarding passengers only).

== Surrounding area ==
- Nōmachi Post Office

== See also ==
- List of railway stations in Japan
