= Takaoka =

Takaoka (高岡, lit. 'tall mount' or 'high hill'), or Takaoka (鷹岡, lit. 'hawk ridge' or 'hawk hill') may refer to:

== Places ==
- Takaoka, Toyama, a city in Toyama Prefecture, Japan
- Takaoka, Miyazaki (高岡町, Takaoka-chō), a former town in Higashimorokata District, Miyazaki, Japan
- Takaoka Dam, a dam in Miyazaki Prefecture, Japan
- Takaoka District, Kōchi, a district in Kōchi, Japan
- Takaoka Domain (高岡藩, Takaoka han), a Japanese domain of the Edo period, in modern-day Chiba Prefecture, Japan
- Takaoka Freight Terminal, a railway freight terminal in Takaoka, Toyama, Japan
- Takaoka Station (disambiguation)
- Takaoka University of Law, Takaoka, Toyama, Japan

== People ==
- Takaoka clan (高岡氏, Takaoka-shi), a historical Japanese clan
- Ai Takaoka (高岡 亜衣, born 1982), Japanese singer-songwriter
- Chishō Takaoka (高岡 智照, 1896-1994), Japanese geisha
- Takaoka Muneyasu (高岡 宗泰, 1255–1326), founder of Takaoka clan in Izumo Province, Japan
- Sousuke Takaoka (高岡 蒼甫, born 1982), Japanese former actor
- Toshinari Takaoka (高岡 寿成, born 1970), Japanese long-distance runner
- Saki Takaoka (高岡 早紀, born 1972), Japanese actress
- Michio Takaoka, the Japanese discoverer of resveratrol in 1939

== Fictional characters ==
- Akira Takaoka (鷹岡 明), a character in the manga/anime series Assassination Classroom

== See also ==
- Albuquerque & Takaoka, a Brazilian architecture, civil engineering and real estate development company
- Zhu–Takaoka string matching algorithm, a variant of the Boyer–Moore string search algorithm
