= Takaoka Station =

Takaoka Station is the name of multiple train or tram stations in Japan:

- Takaoka Station (Aichi) (高岳駅), a train station on the Sakura-dōri Line in Nagoya, Aichi
- Takaoka Station (Toyama) (高岡駅), a JR train station in Takaoka, Toyama
- Takaoka Station (Manyosen) (高岡駅), a Manyosen tram stop in Takaoka, Toyama

== See also ==
- Nishi-Takaoka Station, a train station on the Ainokaze Toyama Line in Takaoka, Toyama
- Shin-Takaoka Station, a train station on the Hokuriku Shinkansen Line and Jōhana Line in Takaoka, Toyama
- Takaoka-Yabunami Station, a train station on the Ainokaze Toyama Line in Takaoka, Toyama
