= Fushiki Station =

Railway station in Takaoka, Toyama Prefecture, Japan

Fushiki Station 伏木駅
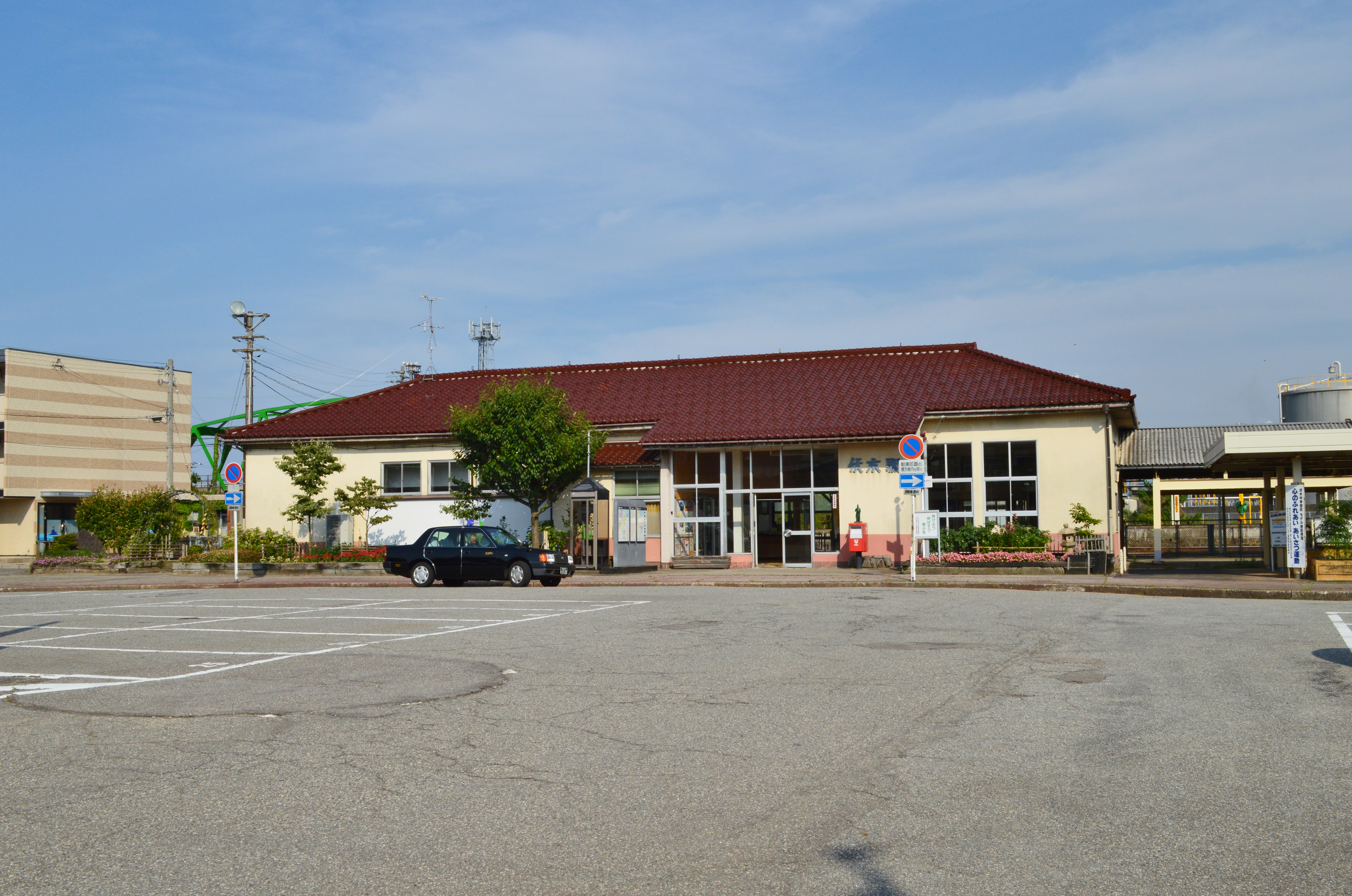
- Fushiki Station in July 2018

General information
- Location: 1 Fushikifurukokufu, Takaoka, Toyama 933-0112; Japan
- Coordinates: 36.7924°N 137.0587°E
- Operator: JR West
- Line: ■ Himi Line
- Distance: 7.3 km from Takaoka
- Platforms: 1 island platform
- Tracks: 2

Construction
- Structure type: At grade

Other information
- Status: Staffed ("Midori no Madoguchi")
- Website: Official website

History
- Opened: 29 December 1900

Passengers
- FY2015: 264 (daily)
Location
- Location within Japan

Fushiki Station (伏木駅, Fushiki-eki) is a railway station on the Himi Line in Takaoka, Toyama Prefecture, Japan, operated by West Japan Railway Company (JR West).

== Lines ==
Fushiki Station is served by the Himi Line, and is located 7.3 kilometers from the opposing end of the line at Takaoka.

== Station layout ==
The station has a single island platform, serving two tracks, connected by a footbridge. The station has a "Midori no Madoguchi" staffed ticket office.

=== Platforms ===
station side	■ Himi Line	for Himi
opposite side	■ Himi Line	for Takaoka

== Adjacent stations ==
«	Service	»
Himi Line
Nōmachi	-	Etchū-Kokubu

== History ==
The station opened on 29 December 1900. With the privatization of Japanese National Railways (JNR) on 1 April 1987, the station came under the control of JR West.

== Passenger statistics ==
In fiscal 2015, the station was used by an average of 264 passengers daily (boarding passengers only).

== Surrounding area ==
- Fushiki Port
- Takaoka Municipal Fushiki Elementary School

== See also ==
- List of railway stations in Japan
