= Shinminato Line =

Freight-only rail line in Japan

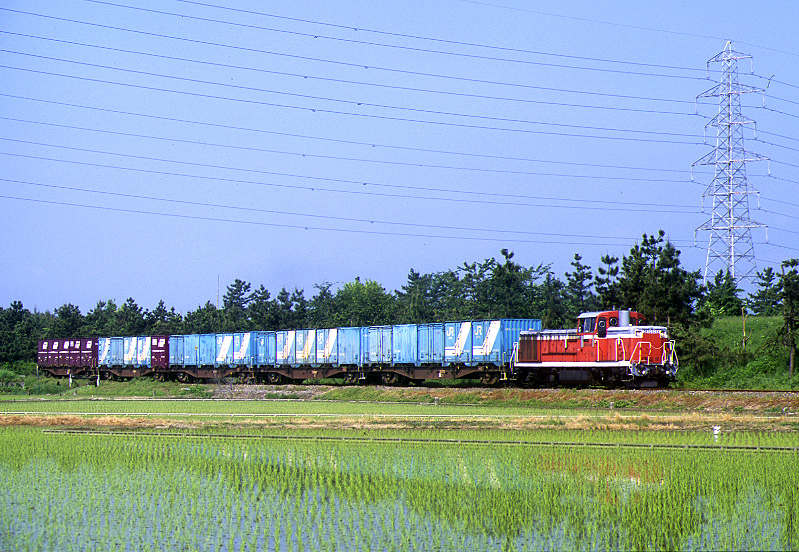
Freight train, May 2002

Shinminato Line (新湊線, Shinminato sen) is a freight-only rail line in Takaoka, Toyama, Japan. It is operated by Japan Freight Railway Company (JR Freight). It runs from Nōmachi Station to Takaoka Freight Terminal.

In January 2024, a section of the Shinminato Line was suspended due to the 2024 Noto earthquake.

== Route data ==
- Company: Japan Freight Railway Company (JR Freight) (Category-1)
- Distance: 1.9 km / 1.2 mi
- Gauge: 1,067 mm / 3 ft 6 in
- Stations: 2
- Double-track line: None
- Electric supply: Not electrified
- Signalling: Simplified automatic

== Stations ==
Station		Distance (km)	Connecting	Location
Nōmachi Station	能町駅	0.0	West Japan Railway Company: Himi Line	Takaoka, Toyama
Takaoka Freight Terminal	高岡貨物駅	1.9		Takaoka, Toyama

== See also ==
- List of railway lines in Japan
