= Etchū-Nakagawa Station =

Railway station in Takaoka, Toyama Prefecture, Japan

Etchū-Nakagawa Station 越中中川駅
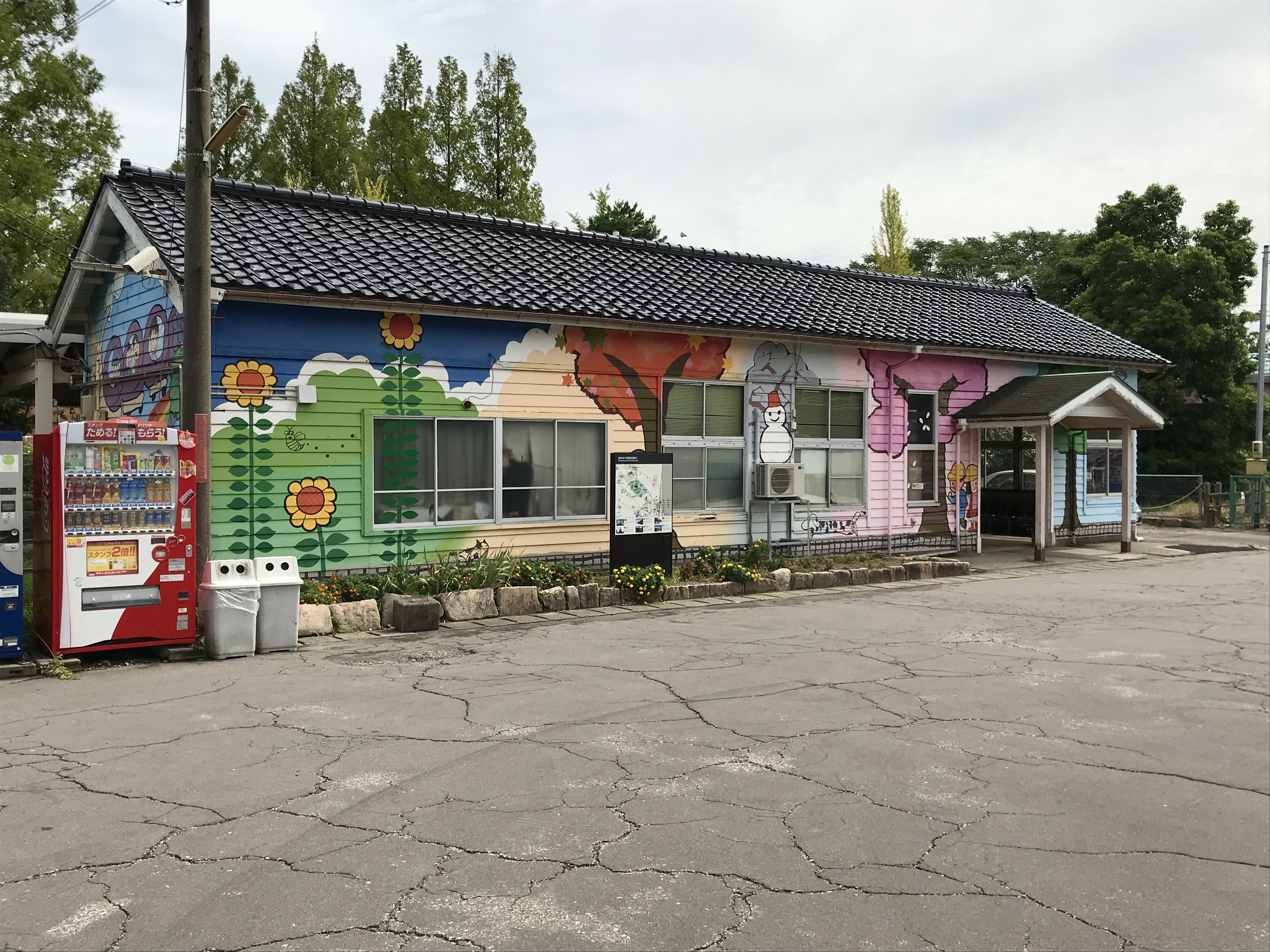
- Etchū-Nakagawa Station in September 2018

General information
- Location: 1-3 Nakagawa, Takaoka, Toyama 933-0056; Japan
- Coordinates: 36.7497°N 137.0278°E
- Operator: JR West
- Line: ■ Himi Line
- Distance: 1.7 km from Takaoka
- Platforms: 1 side platform
- Tracks: 1

Construction
- Structure type: At grade

Other information
- Status: Staffed
- Website: Official website

History
- Opened: 1 April 1916
- Former names: Nakagawa Station (to 1920)

Passengers
- FY2015: 1234 (daily)
Location
- Location within Japan

Etchū-Nakagawa Station (越中中川駅, Etchū-Nakagawa-eki) is a railway station on the Himi Line in the city of Takaoka, Toyama Prefecture, Japan, operated by West Japan Railway Company (JR West).

== Lines ==
Etchū-Nakagawa Station is served by the Himi Line, and is located 1.7 kilometers from the opposing end of the line at Takaoka.

== Station layout ==
The station has a single side platform, serving a single bi-directional track. The station is unattended.

== Adjacent stations ==
«	Service	»
Himi Line
Takaoka	-	Nōmachi

== History ==
The station opened on 1 April 1916 as Nakagawa Station. It was renamed to its present name on 1 September 1920. With the privatization of Japanese National Railways (JNR) on 1 April 1987, the station came under the control of JR West.

== Passenger statistics ==
In fiscal 2015, the station was used by an average of 1234 passengers daily (boarding passengers only).

== Surrounding area ==
- Takaoka City Hall

== See also ==
- List of railway stations in Japan
