= Futatsuka Station =

Railway station in Takaoka, Toyama Prefecture, Japan

Futatsuka Station 二塚駅
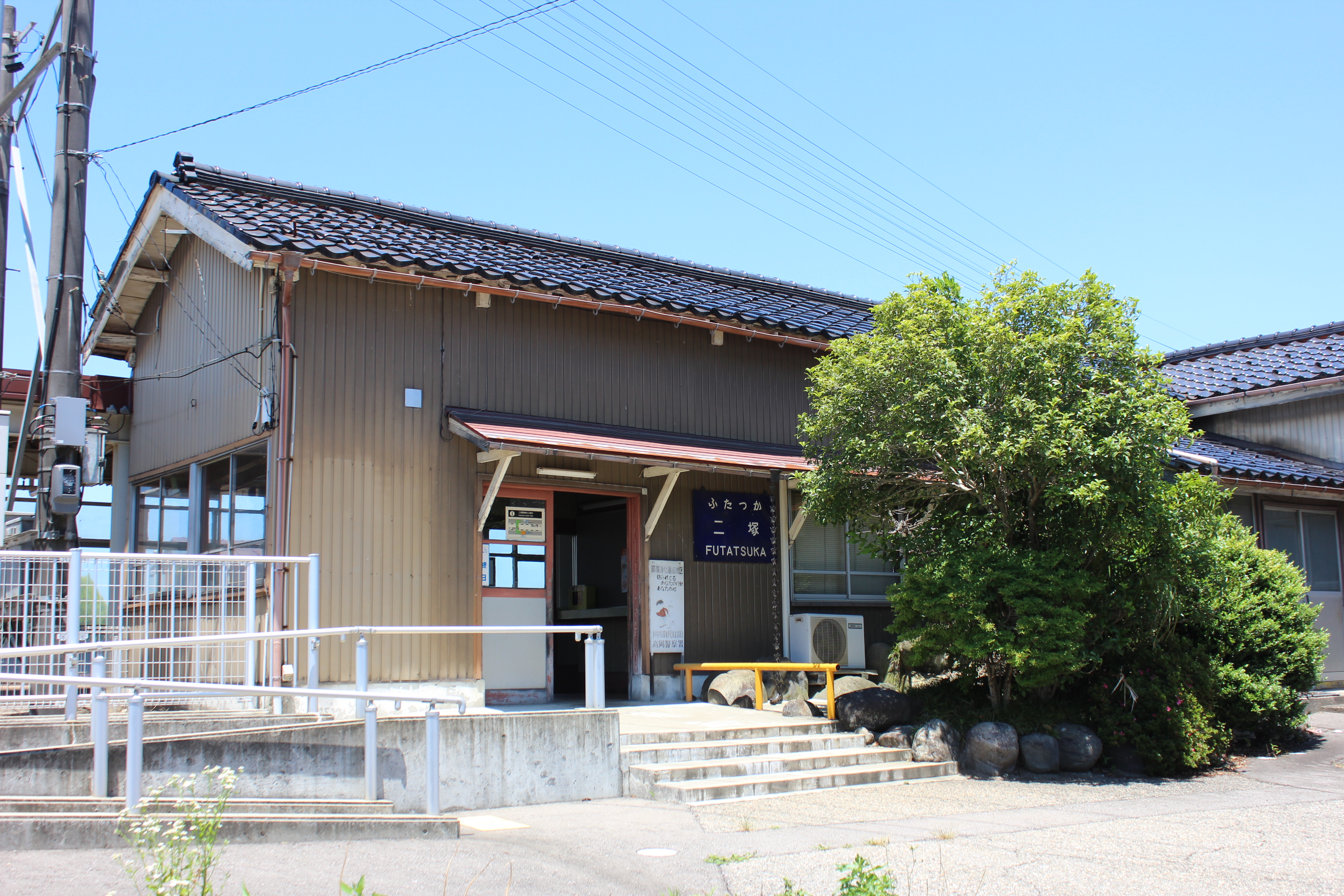
- Futatsuka Station in June 2020

General information
- Location: 2209 Futatsuka, Takaoka-shi, Toyama-ken 933-0816; Japan
- Coordinates: 36.7143°N 137.0061°E
- Operator: JR West
- Line: ■ Jōhana Line
- Distance: 3.3 km from Takaoka
- Platforms: 1 side + 1 island platform
- Tracks: 3

Construction
- Structure type: At grade

Other information
- Status: Unstaffed
- Website: Official website

History
- Opened: 20 February 1914; 112 years ago

Passengers
- FY2015: 41 daily
Location
- Location within Japan

Futatsuka Station (二塚駅, Futatsuka-eki) is a railway station on the Jōhana Line in city of Takaoka, Toyama, Japan, operated by West Japan Railway Company (JR West).

== Lines ==
Futatsuka Station is a station on the Jōhana Line, and is located 3.3 kilometers from the end of the line at Takaoka.

== Layout ==
The station has one ground-level side platform and one ground-level island platform serving a total of three tracks; however, one track is used only by passing freight trains. The platforms are connected by a footbridge. The station is unattended.

== Adjacent stations ==
«	Service	»
Jōhana Line
Shin-Takaoka	-	Hayashi

== History ==
The station opened on 3 April 1899, but was closed in 1902. It was reopened on 20 February 1914. With the privatization of Japanese National Railways (JNR) on 1 April 1987, the station came under the control of JR West.

== Passenger statistics ==
In fiscal 2015, the station was used by an average of 41 passengers daily (boarding passengers only).

== Surrounding area ==
- Chuetsu Pulp and Paper Company
- Futatsuka Elementary School

== See also ==
- List of railway stations in Japan
