= Himi Line =

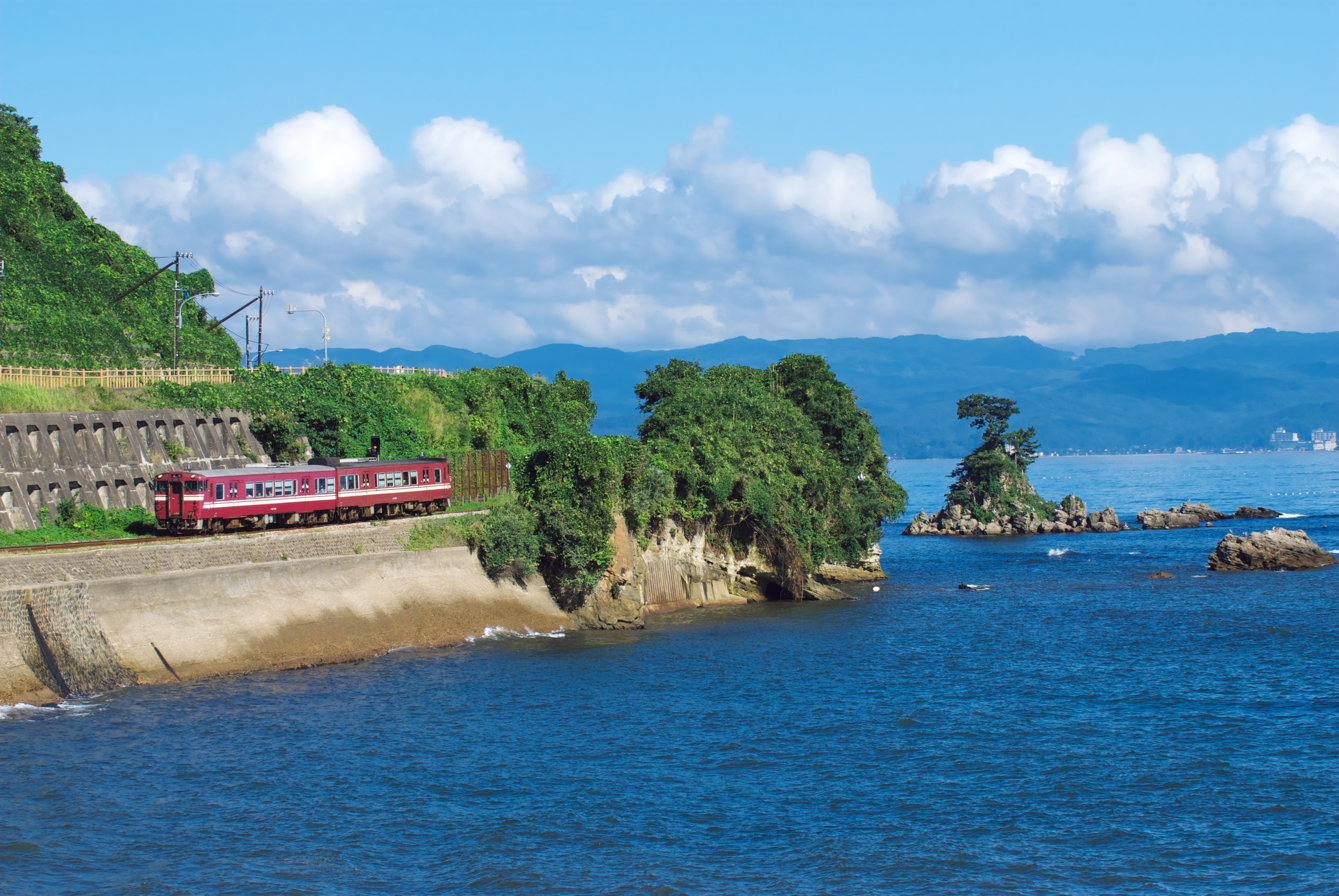
- A KiHa 40 DMU on the Himi Line near Amaharashi

Overview
- Native name: 氷見線
- Status: In operation
- Owner: JR West
- Locale: Toyama Prefecture
- Termini: Takaoka; Himi
- Stations: 8

Service
- Type: Regional rail
- Operator(s): JR West
- Rolling stock: KiHa 40 series DMU

History
- Opened: 1900; 126 years ago

Technical
- Line length: 16.5 km (10.3 mi)
- Number of tracks: Entire line single tracked
- Character: Urban
- Track gauge: 1,067 mm (3 ft 6 in)
- Electrification: None
- Operating speed: 85 km/h (53 mph)
Route map

The Himi Line (氷見線, Himi-sen) is a 16.5 km (10.3 mi) railway line in Toyama Prefecture, Japan, operated by West Japan Railway Company (JR West). It connects Takaoka Station in Takaoka with Himi Station in Himi.

== Service outline ==
Although technically different lines, the Himi Line and the Jōhana Line are sometimes advertised as a single entity. Both start from Takaoka Station and share train sets with local livery.

== Stations ==
Name	Japanese	Between (km)	Distance (km)	Transfers	Location	
Takaoka	高岡	-	0.0	Ainokaze Toyama Railway Line, Jōhana Line	Takaoka	Toyama
Etchū-Nakagawa	越中中川	1.7	1.7		Takaoka	Toyama
Nōmachi	能町	2.4	4.1	Shinminato Line (Freight only)	Takaoka	Toyama
Fushiki	伏木	3.2	7.3		Takaoka	Toyama
Etchū-Kokubu	越中国分	1.7	9.0		Takaoka	Toyama
Amaharashi	雨晴	1.9	10.9		Takaoka	Toyama
Shimao	島尾	2.6	13.5		Himi	Toyama
Himi	氷見	3.0	16.5		Himi	Toyama

== History ==
The line opened on 29 December 1900 between Takaoka and Fushiki, operated by the Chuetsu Railway. It was extended to Himi on 19 September 1912. The company was nationalised on 1 September 1920. With the privatization of JNR on 1 April 1987, the Himi Line was transferred to the ownership and control of JR West.
