= Takaoka Freight Terminal =

Takaoka Freight Terminal 高岡貨物駅
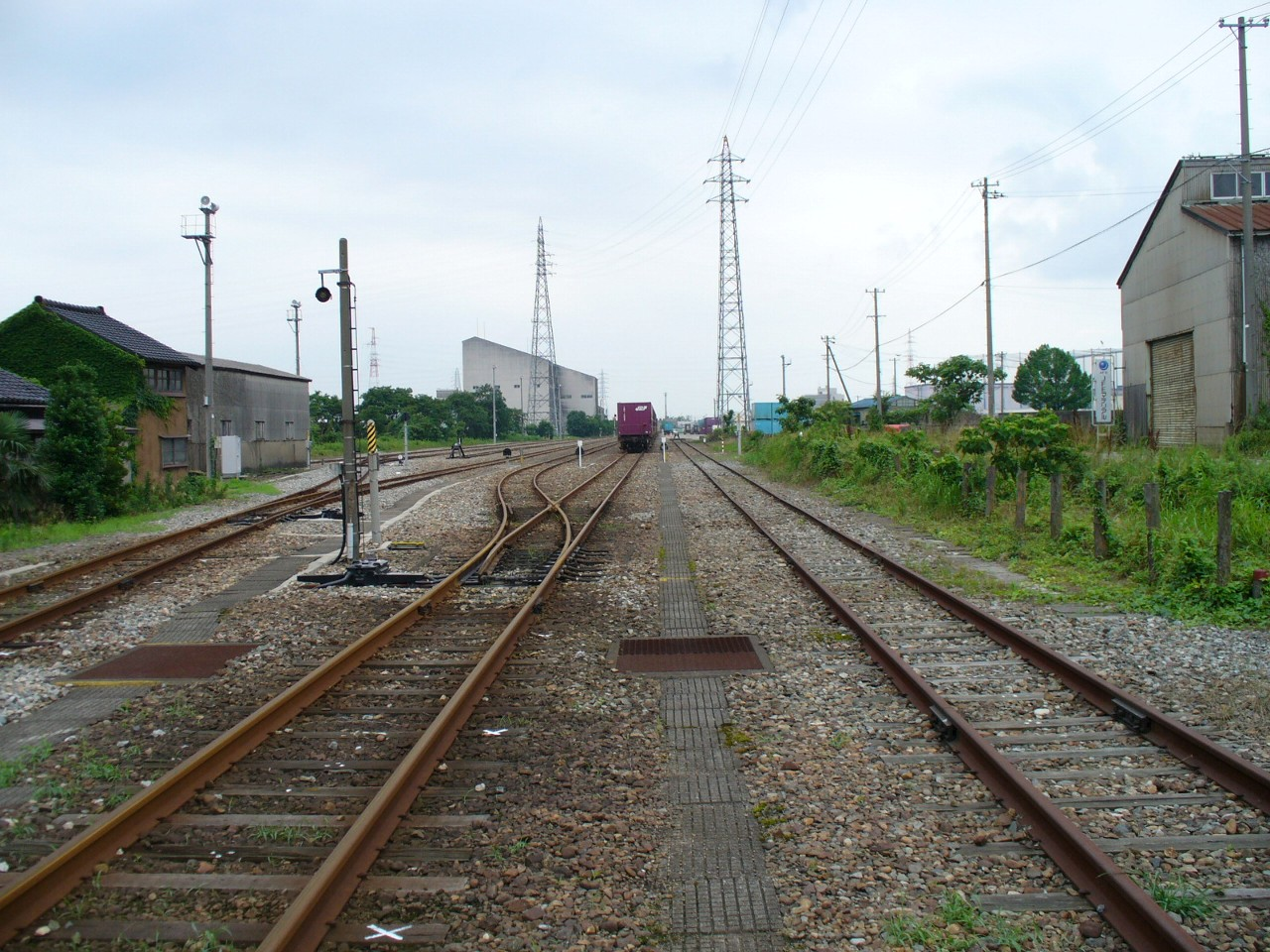
- Takaoka Freight Terminal seen from a nearby railroad crossing

General information
- Location: 1-1-20 Yoshihisa, Takaoka City, Toyama Prefecture; Japan
- Coordinates: 36°46′39.6″N 137°3′3.5″E
- Operator: JR Freight
- Line: ■ Shinminato Line
- Distance: 1.9 km from Nōmachi

History
- Opened: 27 January 1918
Location
- Location within Toyama Prefecture Location within Japan

Takaoka Freight Terminal (高岡貨物駅, Takaoka-kamotsu-eki) is a railway freight terminal in Takaoka, Toyama, Japan, operated by Japan Freight Railway Company (JR Freight). The terminal is located at the end of the Shinminato Line.

== History ==
Takaoka Freight Terminal opened on 27 January 1918. The station was absorbed into the JR Freight network upon the privatization of JNR on 1 April 1987.

== Surrounding area ==
- Man'yōsen Takaoka Kidō Line Shin-Yoshihisa Station

== See also ==
- List of railway stations in Japan
