= Shin-Takaoka Station =

Railway station in Takaoka, Toyama Prefecture, Japan

Shin-Takaoka Station 新高岡駅
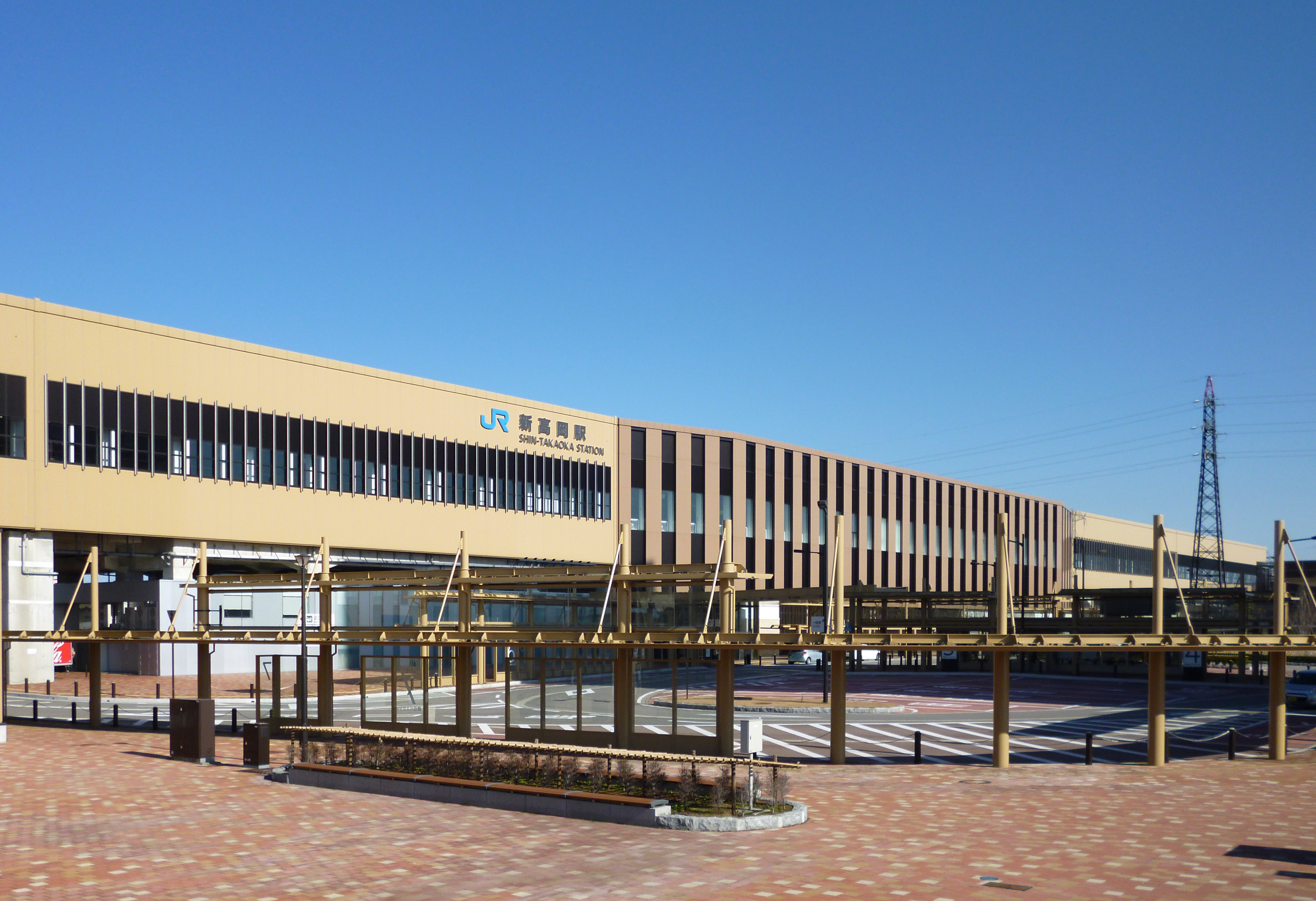
- The south side of Shin-Takaoka Station in January 2017

General information
- Location: 1790–2 Shimokuroda, Takaoka City; Toyama Prefecture; Japan
- Coordinates: 36.726971°N 137.011845°E
- Operator: JR West
- Lines: Hokuriku Shinkansen; ■ Jōhana Line
- Distance: 305.8 km (190.0 mi) from Takasaki
- Platforms: 3 side platforms (2 Shinkansen)
- Tracks: 3 (2 Shinkansen)

Construction
- Structure type: Elevated (Shinkansen); At grade (conventional lines)

Other information
- Status: Staffed (Midori no Madoguchi)
- Website: Official website

History
- Opened: 14 March 2015; 11 years ago

Services
Preceding station	JR West	Following station
Kanazawa towards Tsuruga	Hokuriku Shinkansen Hakutaka	Toyama towards Jōetsumyōkō
Kanazawa towards Tsuruga	Hokuriku Shinkansen Tsurugi	Toyama Terminus
Location
- Location within Toyama Prefecture Location within Japan

Shin-Takaoka Station (新高岡駅, Shin-takaoka-eki) is an interchange railway station on the high-speed Hokuriku Shinkansen line and Jōhana Line in Takaoka, Toyama, Japan, operated by West Japan Railway Company (JR West). It opened on 14 March 2015, coinciding with the opening of the Hokuriku Shinkansen extension from Nagano to Kanazawa.

== Lines ==
Shin-Takaoka Station is served by the Jōhana Line and the high-speed Hokuriku Shinkansen line from Tokyo to Kanazawa, and is located 305.8 km from the official starting point of the line at Takasaki. Semi-fast Hakutaka Tokyo-to-Kanazawa services and Tsurugi Toyama-to-Tsuruga services stop at Shin-Takaoka.

== Station layout ==
The station consists of two elevated side platforms for the Hokuriku Shinkansen running east to west, with exits on the north and south sides. The Jōhana Line has a single side platform located at ground level, running north to south on the west side of the station complex. A west exit is also provided to the west of the Jōhana Line platforms.

=== Platforms ===
The single-track Jōhana Line is served by an un-numbered ground-level side platform.

The elevated shinkansen platforms consist of two 312 m long side platforms serving two tracks. The platforms are fitted with chest-high platform edge doors.

1	■ Hokuriku Shinkansen	for Toyama, Nagano, and Tokyo
2	■ Hokuriku Shinkansen	for Kanazawa and Tsuruga

The departure melody used for the shinkansen platforms was composed by Yutaka Ōta (太田 豊), who was born in Toyama Prefecture.

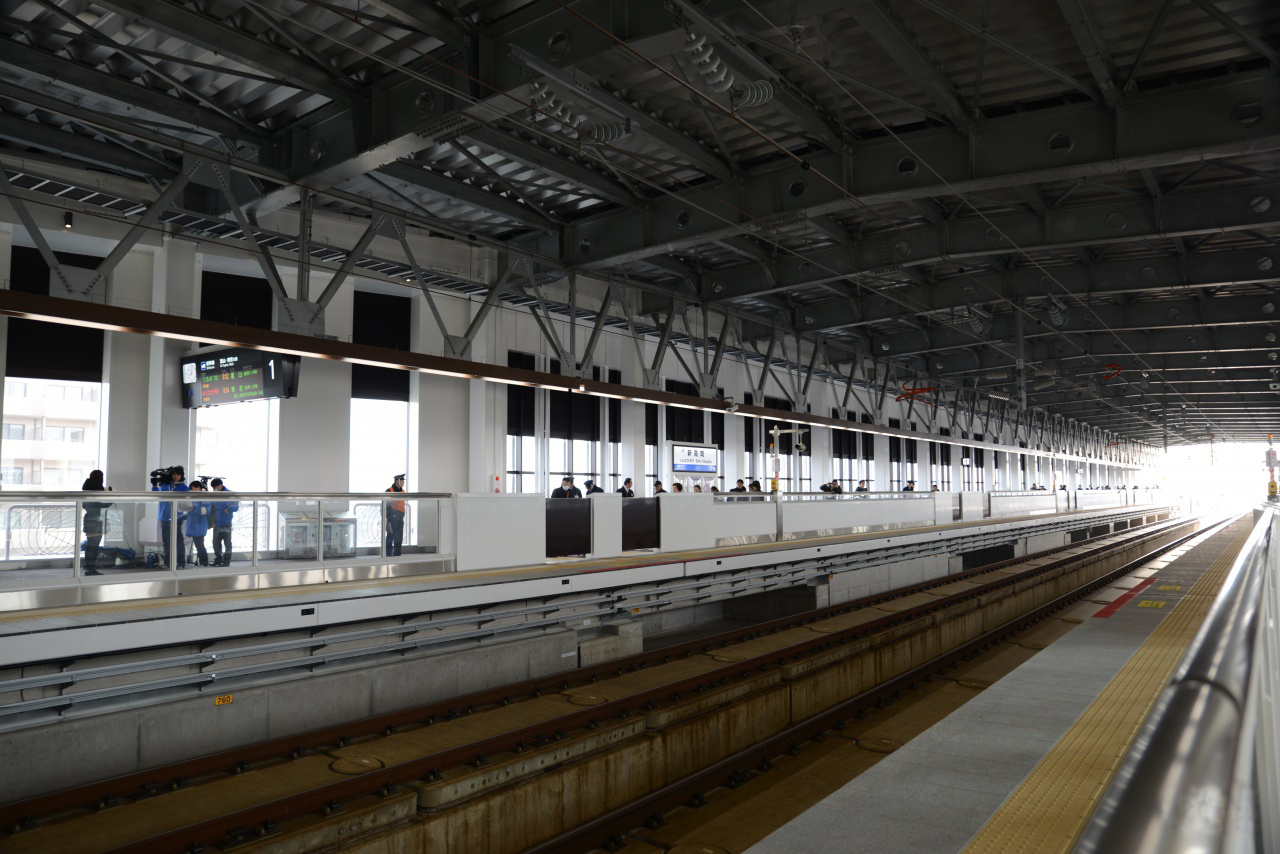
The Hokuriku Shinkansen platforms, March 2015

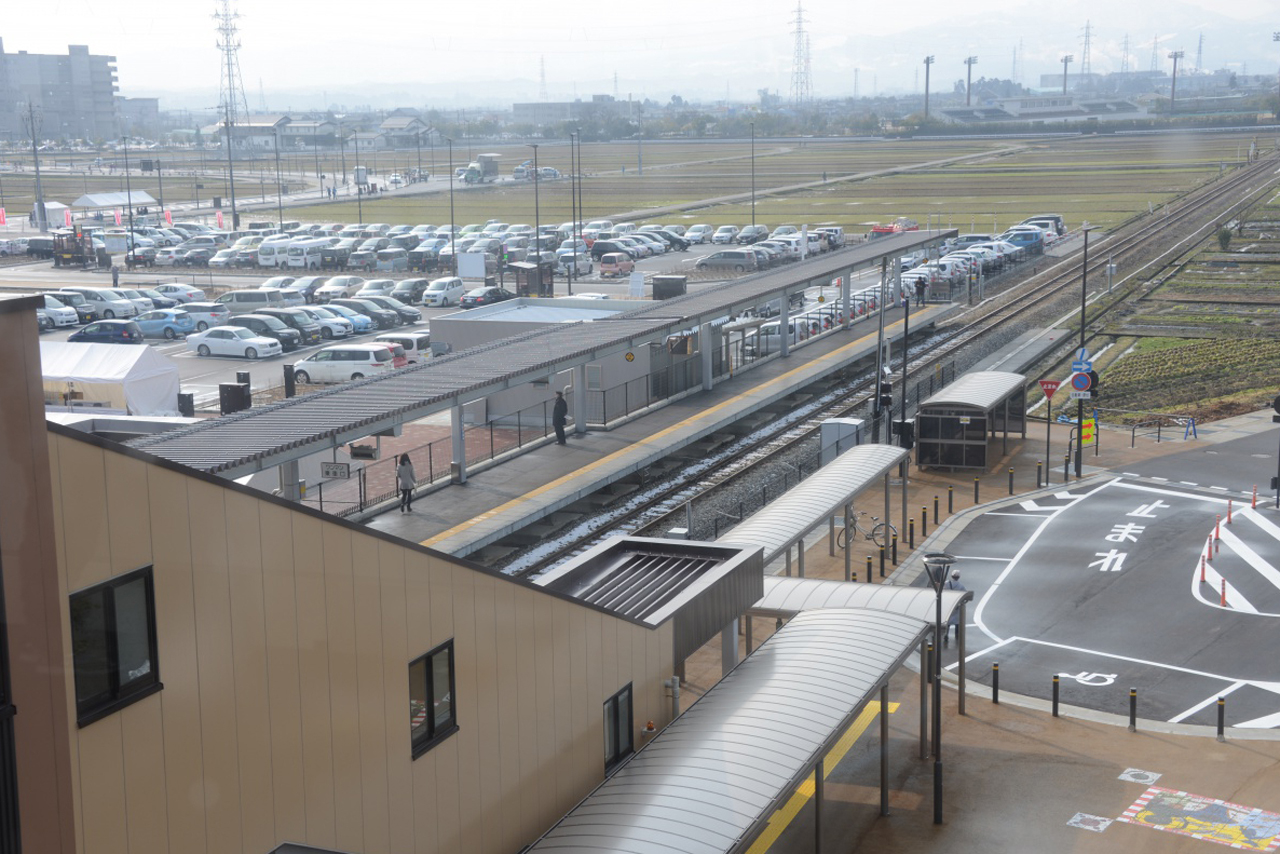
The Johana Line platform viewed from the main station building, March 2015

=== Facilities ===
The station has a "Midori no Madoguchi" staffed ticket office.

== Adjacent stations ==
«	Service	»
Johana Line
Takaoka	-	Futatsuka

== History ==
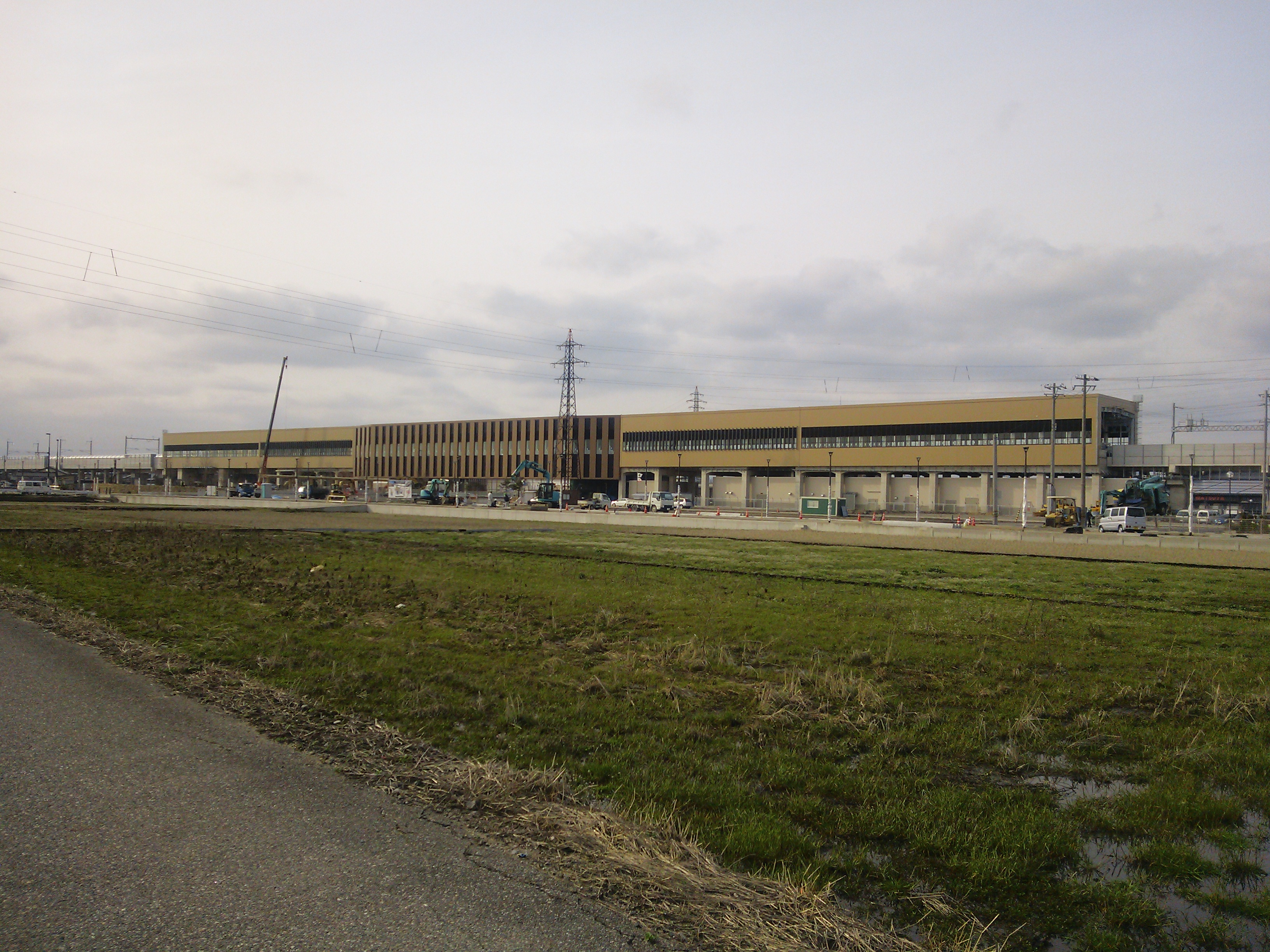
The south side of the station while under construction in March 2014

Although provisionally named Shin-Takaoka Station from its conception, the name was formally finalized and announced in June 2013. A public survey was conducted in 2012, with the following names put forward.

1. Manyō-Takaoka (万葉高岡) (173 votes)
2. Shin-Takaoka (新高岡) (163 votes)
3. Etchū-Takaoka (越中高岡) (107 votes)
4. Takaoka-Manyō (高岡万葉) (59 votes)
5. Takaoka (高岡) (43 votes)

The name Shin-Takaoka was however ultimately selected by JR West.

The groundbreaking ceremony for the Johana Line station building was held on 14 September 2013.

== Surrounding area ==
- Takaoka Station (on the Ainokaze Toyama Railway Line, approximately 1 km away)
- Zuiryū-ji Temple, a 15-minute walk away
- Aeon Mall Takaoka
- National Route 156

== See also ==
- List of railway stations in Japan
