= Himi Station =

Railway station in Himi, Toyama Prefecture, Japan

Himi Station 氷見駅
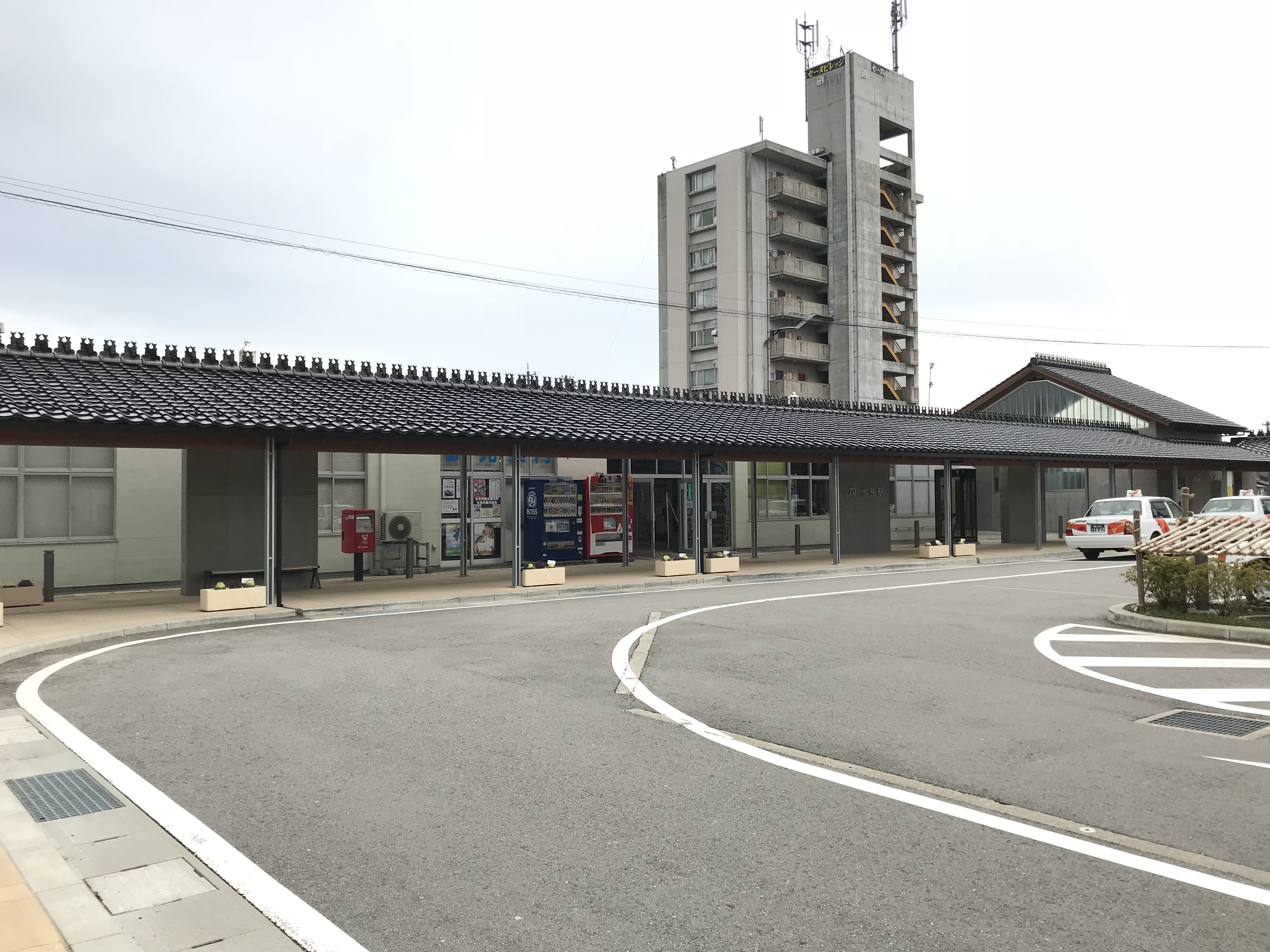
- Himi Station in March 2018

General information
- Location: 1-12-18 Ise-Omachi, Himi-shi, Toyama-ken 935-0015; Japan
- Coordinates: 36°50′58.23″N 136°59′26.63″E
- Operator: JR West
- Line: ■ Himi Line
- Distance: 16.5 km from Takaoka
- Platforms: 1 island platform
- Tracks: 1

Construction
- Structure type: At grade

Other information
- Status: Staffed (Midori no Madoguchi)
- Website: Official website

History
- Opened: 19 September 1912

Passengers
- FY2015: 843 daily
Location
- Location within Japan

Himi Station (氷見駅, Himi-eki) is a railway station on the Himi Line in the city of Himi in Toyama Prefecture, Japan, operated by West Japan Railway Company (JR West).

== Lines ==
Himi Station is the starting point of the Himi Line, and is located 16.5 kilometers from the opposing end of the line at Takaoka.

== Station layout ==
Himi Station consists of a single ground-level dead-headed island platform, of which only one side is in operation. The station has a Midori no Madoguchi staffed ticket office.

=== Platforms ===
1	■ Himi Line	for Takaoka
2	■ Himi Line	Not in use

== Adjacent stations ==
«	Service	»
Himi Line
Shimao	-	Terminus

== History ==
The station opened on 19 September 1912. With the privatization of Japanese National Railways (JNR) on 1 April 1987, the station came under the control of JR West.

== Passenger statistics ==
In fiscal 2015, the station was used by an average of 843 passengers daily (boarding passengers only).

== Surrounding area ==
- National Route 415
- Himi High School

== See also ==
- List of railway stations in Japan
