= Japan National Route 415 =

National highway of Japan

National Route 415
- 国道415号

Route information
- Length: 68.1 km (42.3 mi)

Location
- Country: Japan

Highway system
- National highways of Japan; Expressways of Japan
← National Route 414	→ National Route 416

National Route 415 is a national highway of Japan connecting Hakui, Ishikawa and Toyama, Toyama in Japan, with a total length of 68.1 km (42.32 mi).
