= Takaoka Station (Toyama) =

Railway station in Takaoka, Toyama Prefecture, Japan

Coordinates: 36°44′28″N 137°00′55″E

Takaoka Station 高岡駅
- Takaoka Station "Zuiryuji" (South) entrance, July 2026

General information
- Location: 6–1 Shimozekimachi, Takaoka, Toyama （富山県高岡市下関町６番１号） Japan
- Operator: Ainokaze Toyama Railway; JR West
- Lines: Ainokaze Toyama Railway Line, Himi Line, Jōhana Line
- Connections: Bus terminal; Takaoka Station (Manyosen)
Location

Takaoka Station (高岡駅, Takaoka-eki) is a major interchange railway station on the Ainokaze Toyama Railway Line in Takaoka, Toyama, Japan, operated by Ainokaze Toyama Railway.

== Lines ==
Takaoka Station is situated on the Ainokaze Toyama Railway, and is also the starting point of the 16.5 km (10.3 mi) Himi Line to Himi in Himi, Toyama and the 29.5 km (18.3 mi) Jōhana Line to Jōhana in Nanto, Toyama.

== Limited express services ==
There is no limited express services at the station as the city of Takaoka is served by the Hokuriku Shinkansen at Shin-Takaoka Station. Prior to the opening of the Shinkansen in 2015, the station was served by the following limited express services.

- Thunderbird
- Hakutaka
- Hokuetsu

== Station layout ==
The station has three island platforms and one side platform serving a total of seven tracks. The station building is located above the tracks, with the Kojokoen Entrance (古城公園口) on the north side (actually indicated as the "East Entrance"), and the Zuiryuji Entrance (瑞龍寺口) on the south side. The station has a staffed ticket office.

=== Platforms ===
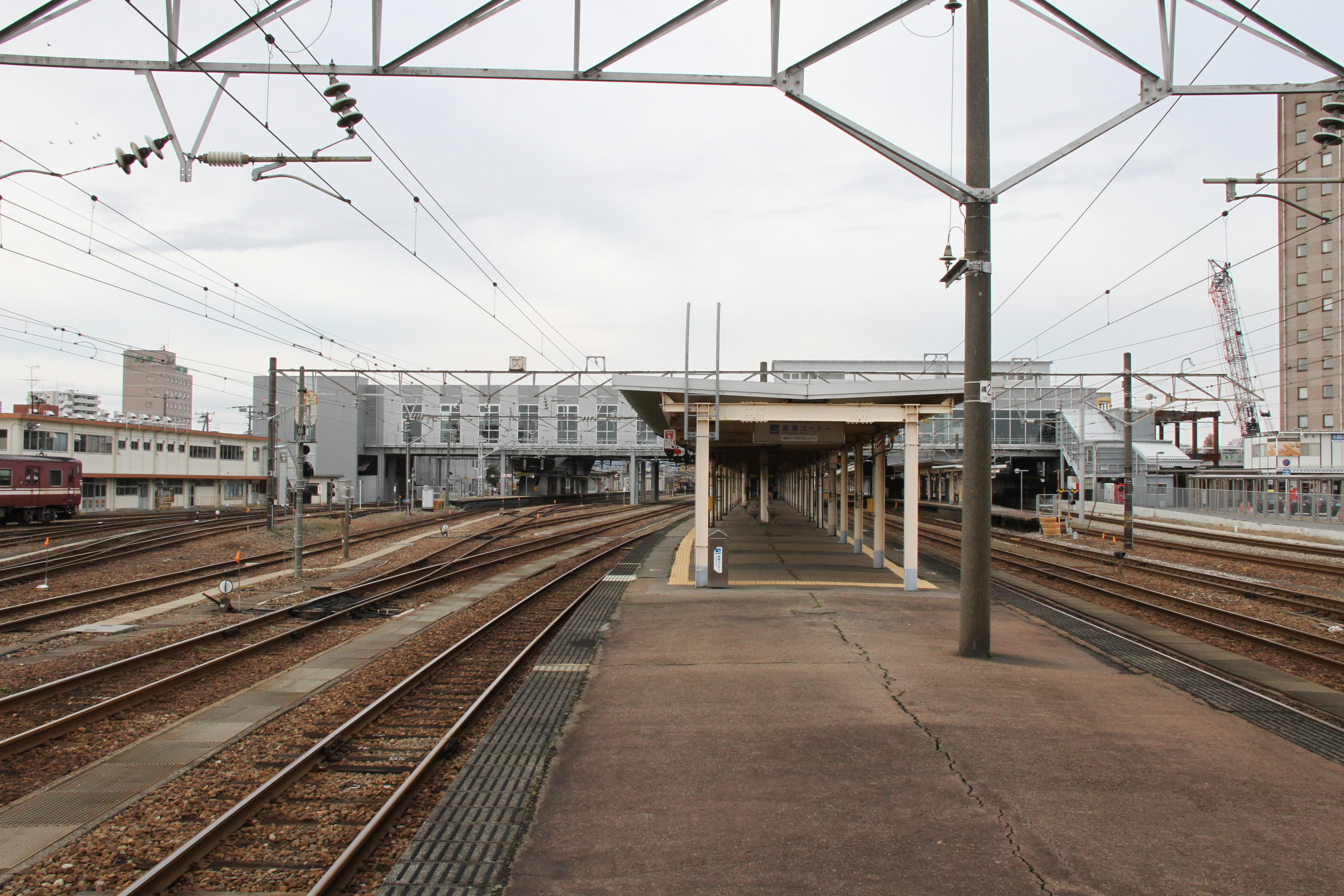
View from the Toyama (east) end of platforms 3/4, December 2012

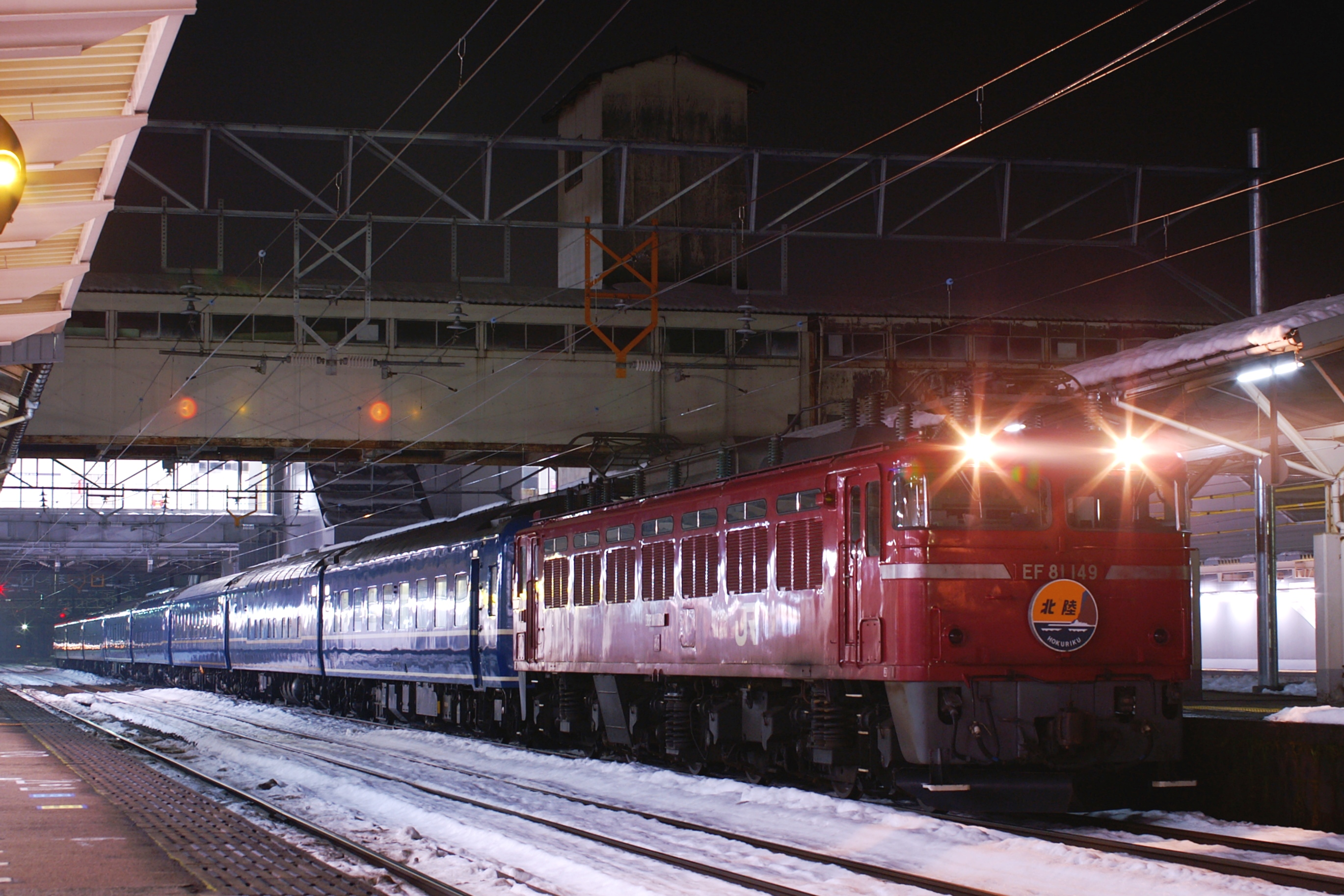
A Hokuriku sleeping car service at Takaoka Station, January 2010

1	■ Johana Line	for Johana
2	■ Ainokaze Toyama Railway Line	for Toyama and Tomari
2	■ Johana Line	for Johana
3	■ Ainokaze Toyama Railway Line	for Toyama and Tomari
3	■ Ainokaze Toyama Railway Line	for Kanazawa
4	■ Ainokaze Toyama Railway Line	for Kanazawa
5	■ Ainokaze Toyama Railway Line	for Toyama and Tomari
6	■ Ainokaze Toyama Railway Line	for Toyama and Tomari
7	■ Himi Line	for Himi

== Adjacent stations ==
«	Service	»
Ainokaze Toyama Railway Line
Isurugi	Ainokaze Liner	Kosugi
Takaoka-Yabunami	Local	Etchū-Daimon
Johana Line
Terminus	Local	Shin-Takaoka
Himi Line
Terminus	Local	Etchū-Nakagawa

== History ==
Takaoka Station opened on 1 November 1898.

Work started in October 2007 to rebuild the station with an overpass connecting the north and south sides. The new overhead station building was completed in August 2011. Remodelling of the surrounding area was scheduled to be completed by early 2015.

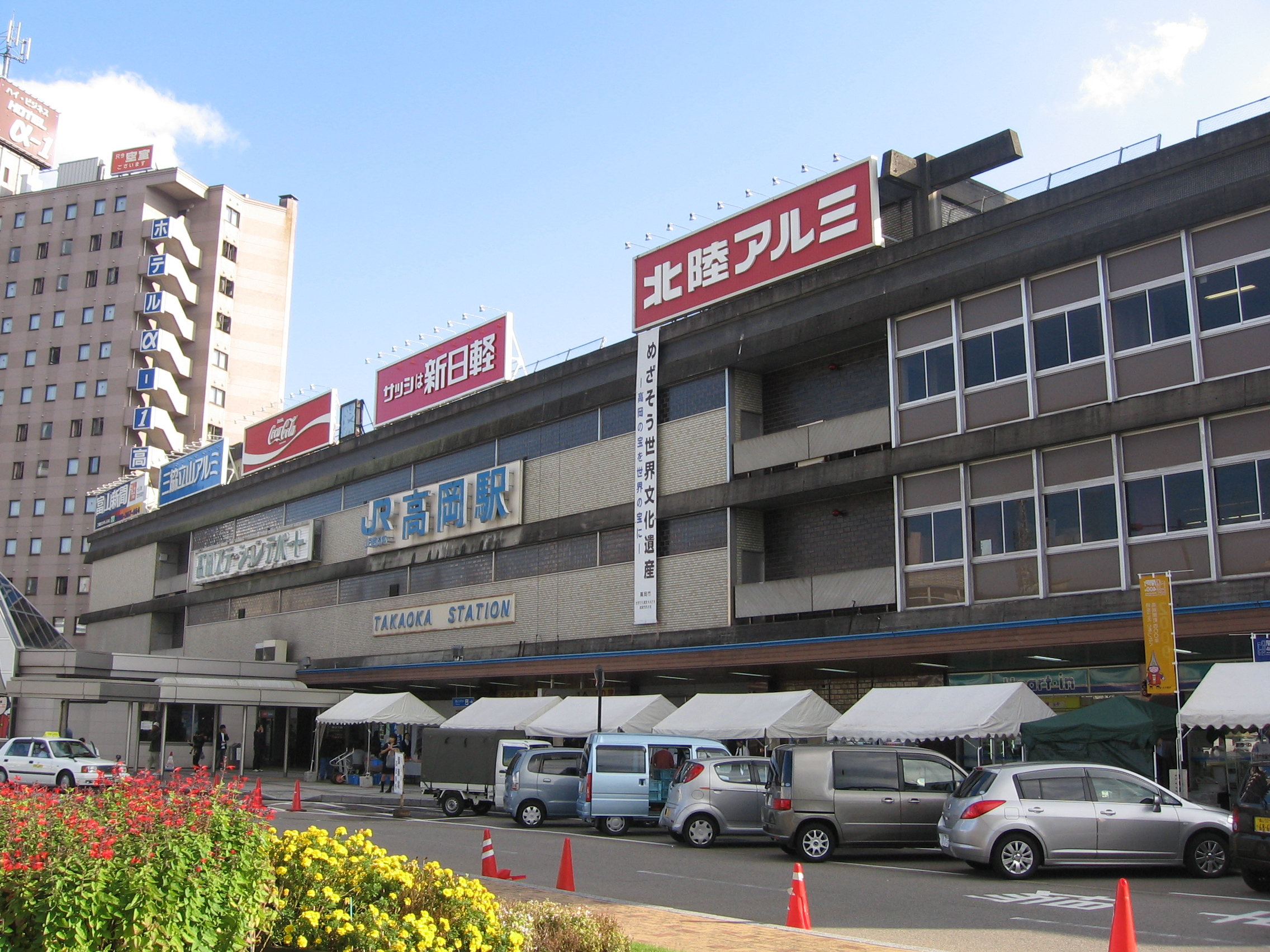
Former north entrance, November 2008

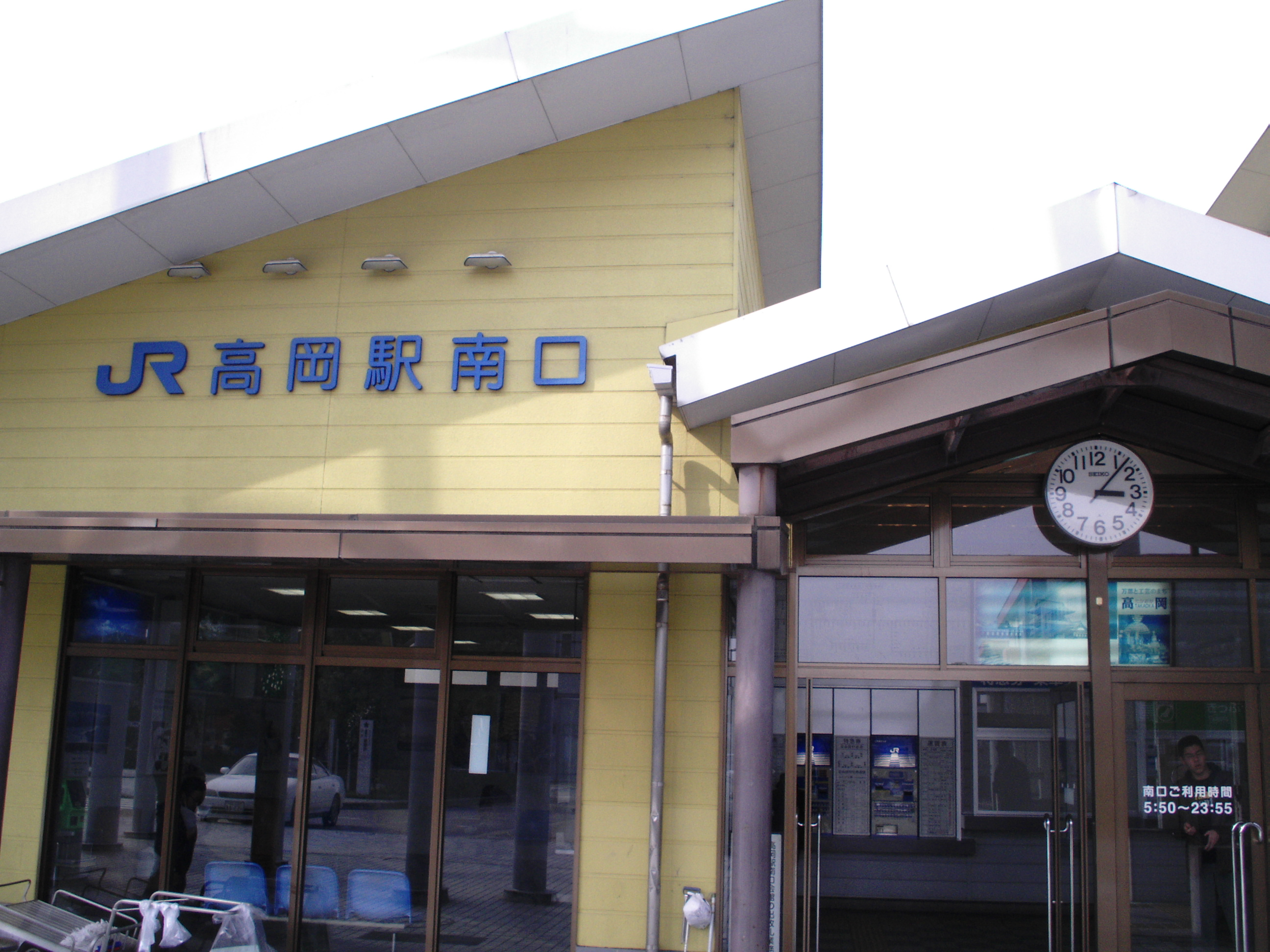
Former south entrance, April 2006

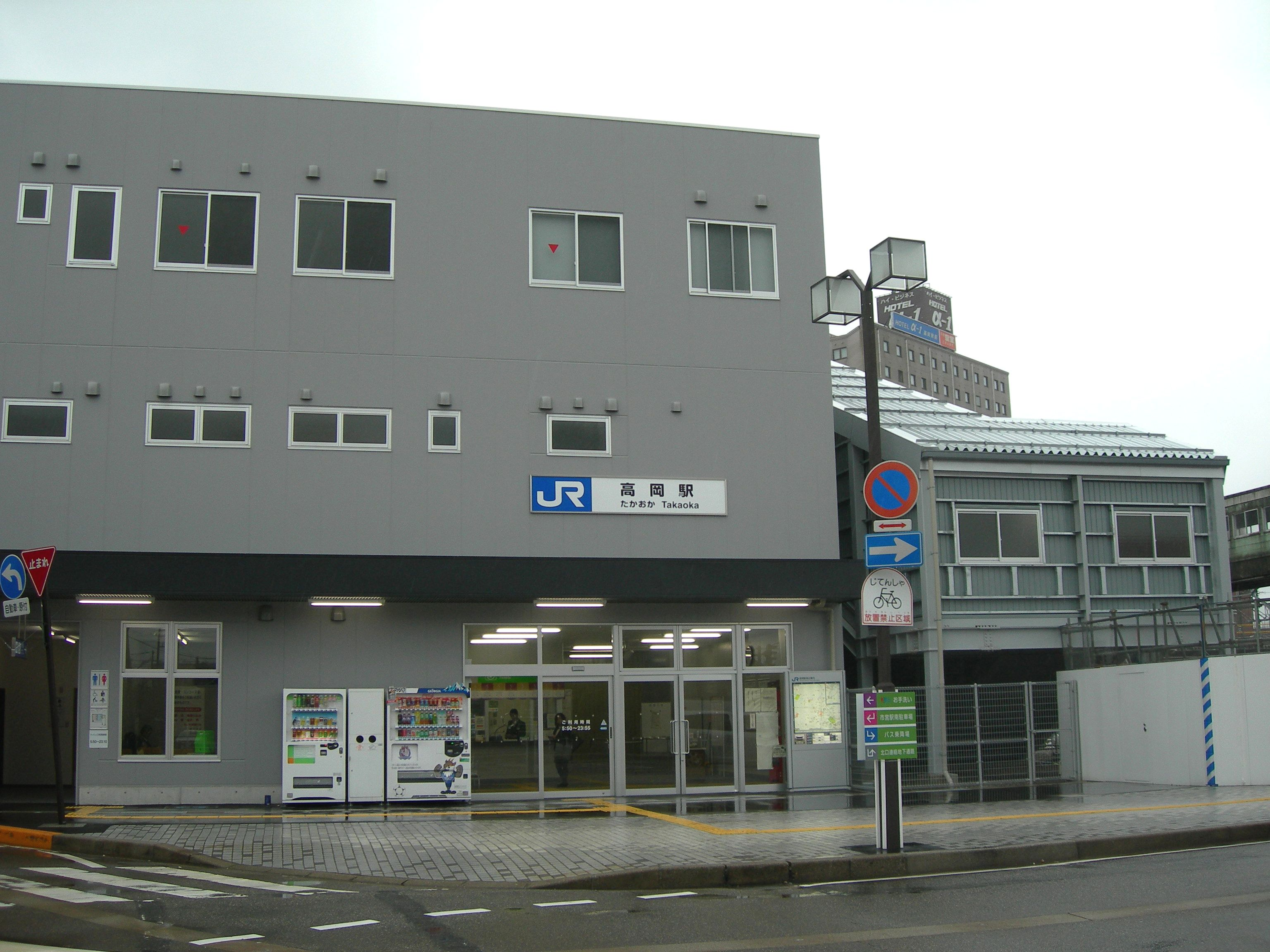
Temporary structure on the south side during rebuilding work, March 2010

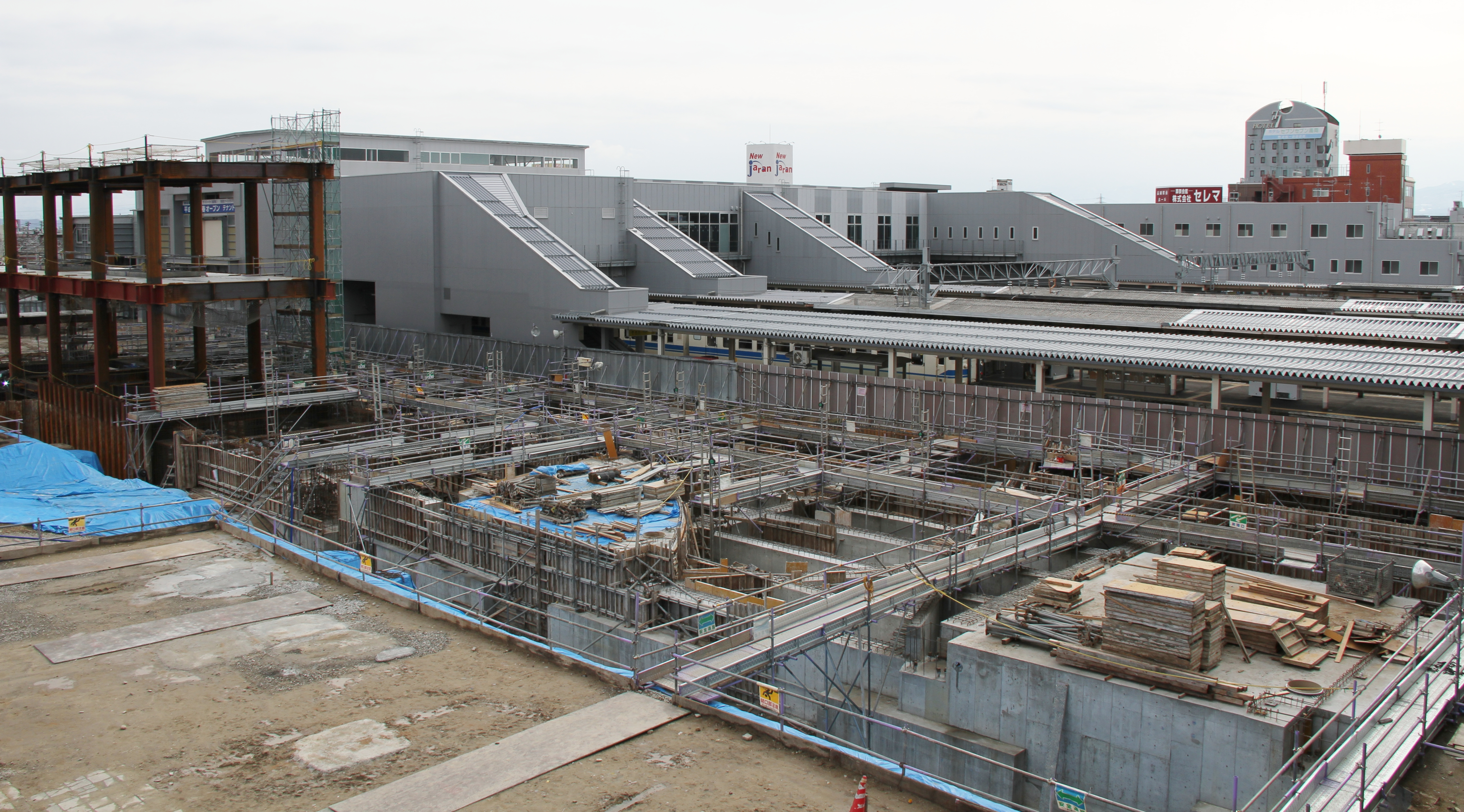
Construction work on the north side of the station structure, December 2012

== Surrounding area ==
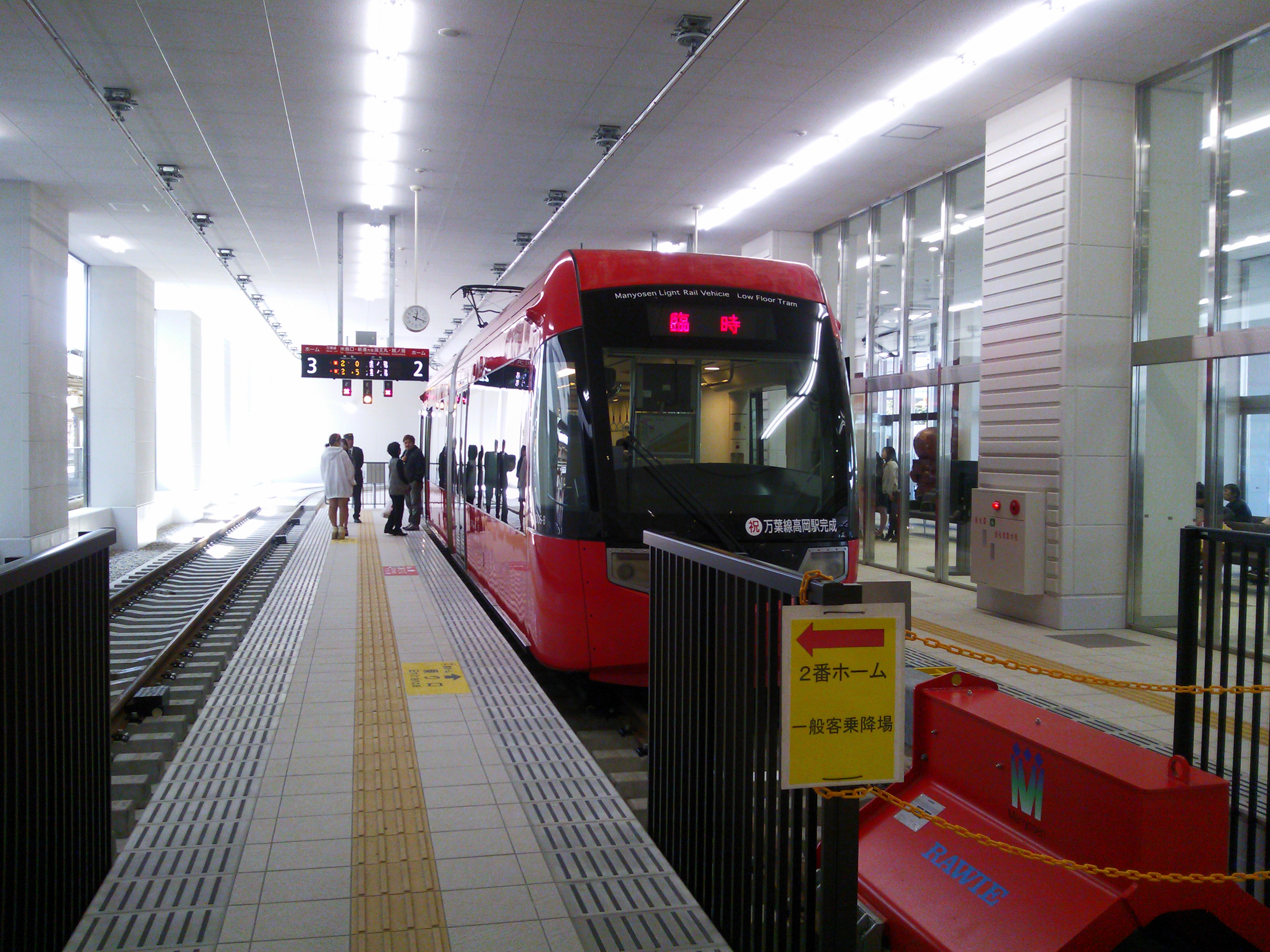
Manyosen tram stop, April 2014

=== Kojokoen Entrance (north side) ===
- Takaoka Station (Manyosen Takaoka Kido Line tram stop)
- Takaoka Kojokoen Park
- Imizu Shrine
- Takaoka Art Museum

=== Zuiryuji Entrance (south side) ===
- Zuiryuji Temple
