= Etchū-Miyazaki Station =

Railway station in Asahi, Toyama Prefecture, Japan

Etchū-Miyazaki Station 越中宮崎駅
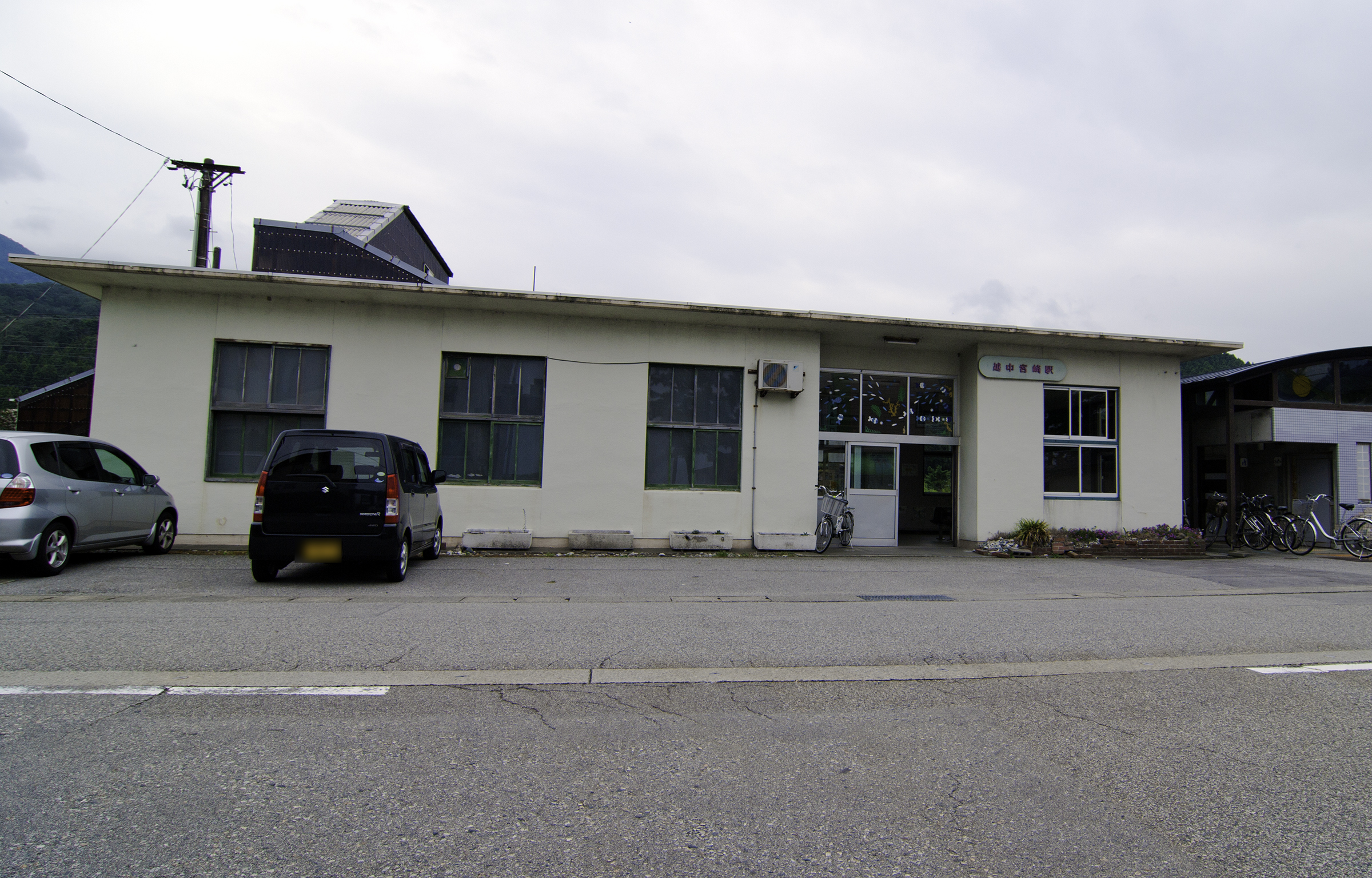
- Etchū-Miyazaki Station in September 2011

General information
- Location: 3239 Miyazaki-Yotota Asahi-machi, Niikawa-gun, Toyama-ken 939-0703; Japan
- Coordinates: 36.9740°N 137.5994°E
- Operator: Ainokaze Toyama Railway
- Line: ■ Ainokaze Toyama Railway Line
- Distance: 48.2 km from Kurikara
- Platforms: 1 island platform
- Tracks: 2

Other information
- Status: Unattended
- Website: Official website

History
- Opened: 20 November 1957

Passengers
- FY2015: 67 daily
Location
- Location within Japan

Etchū-Miyazaki Station (越中宮崎駅, Etchū-Miyazaki-eki) is a railway station on the Ainokaze Toyama Railway Line in the town of Asahi, Toyama Prefecture, Japan, operated by the third-sector railway operator Ainokaze Toyama Railway.

== Lines ==
Etchū-Miyazaki Station is served by the Ainokaze Toyama Railway Line and is 95.4 kilometres from the starting point of the line at Kurikara. Some trains of the Echigo Tokimeki Railway Nihonkai Hisui Line terminate at Etchū-Miyazaki Station rather than neighbouring Ichiburi.

== Station layout ==
Etchū-Miyazaki Station has one island platform connected by a footbridge. The station is unattended.

=== Platforms ===
1	■ Echigo Tokimeki Railway Nihonkai Hisui Line	for Itoigawa and Naoetsu
2	■ Ainokaze Toyama Railway Line	for Tomari, Uozu and Toyama

== History ==
Etchū-Miyazaki Station opened on 20 November 1957 as a station on the Japan National Railways (JNR). It was privatized on 1 April 1984, becoming a station on JR West.

From 14 March 2015, with the opening of the Hokuriku Shinkansen extension from Nagano to Kanazawa, local passenger operations over sections of the former Hokuriku Main Line running roughly parallel to the new shinkansen line were reassigned to different third-sector railway operating companies. From this date, Etchū-Miyazaki Station was transferred to the ownership of the third-sector operating company Ainokaze Toyama Railway.

== Adjacent stations ==
«	Service	»
Ainokaze Toyama Railway Line
Tomari	Local	Ichiburi

== Passenger statistics ==
In fiscal 2015, the station was used by an average of 67 passengers daily (boarding passengers only).

== Surrounding area ==
- National Route 8
- Miyazaki Fishing Port

== See also ==
- List of railway stations in Japan
