= Nadachi Station =

Railway station in Joetsu, Niigata prefecture, Japan

Nadachi Station 名立駅
- Nadachi Station in September 2016

General information
- Location: Nadachi-Omachi, Nadachi Town, Jōetsu City, Niigata Prefecture 949-1602; Japan
- Coordinates: 37.1558°N 138.0927°E
- Operator: Echigo TOKImeki
- Line: Nihonkai Hisui Line
- Distance: 45.1 km (28.0 mi) from Ichiburi
- Platforms: 2 side platforms
- Tracks: 2

Construction
- Structure type: Elevated

Other information
- Status: Unstaffed

History
- Opened: 1 July 1911; 115 years ago

Passengers
- FY2021: 78 daily

Services
Preceding station	Echigo TOKImeki	Following station
Tsutsuishi towards Ichiburi	Nihonkai Hisui Line	Arimagawa towards Naoetsu
Location
- Location within Niigata Prefecture Location within Chubu region Location within Japan

Nadachi Station (名立駅, Nadachi-eki) is a railway station in the city of Jōetsu, Niigata, Japan, operated by the third-sector railway operator Echigo Tokimeki Railway.

== Lines ==
Nadachi Station is served by the Echigo Tokimeki Railway Nihonkai Hisui Line, and is 45.1 kilometers from the starting point of the line at Ichiburi and 339.6 kilometers from Maibara Station.

== Station layout ==
The station consists of two opposed elevated side platforms, with the station building at ground level. The station is unattended.

=== Platforms ===
Station side	■ Nihonkai Hisui Line	for Naoetsu
Opposite side	■ Nihonkai Hisui Line	for Itoigawa

== History ==
The station opened on 1 July 1911. The station was relocated to its present location on 1 October 1969. With the privatization of Japanese National Railways (JNR) on 1 April 1987, the station came under the control of JR West. From 14 March 2015, with the opening of the Hokuriku Shinkansen extension from Nagano to Kanazawa, local passenger operations over sections of the Shinetsu Main Line and Hokuriku Main Line running roughly parallel to the new shinkansen line were reassigned to third-sector railway operating companies. From this date, Nadachi Station was transferred to the ownership of the third-sector operating company Echigo Tokimeki Railway.

== Passenger statistics ==
In fiscal 2017, the station was used by an average of 99 passengers daily (boarding passengers only).

== Surrounding area ==
- Nadachi Beach
- Nadachi Post Office
- Nadachi Junior High School

== See also ==
- List of railway stations in Japan
