= Nō Station =

Railway station in Itoigawa, Niigata prefecture, Japan

Nō Station 能生駅
- Nō Station in May 2017

General information
- Location: 2538 Shirabyoshi, Nō, Itoigawa City, Niigata Prefecture; Japan
- Coordinates: 37.0962°N 137.9884°E
- Operator: Echigo TOKImeki
- Line: Nihonkai Hisui Line
- Distance: 33.4 km (20.8 mi) from Ichiburi
- Platforms: 2 island platforms
- Tracks: 2

Construction
- Structure type: Elevated

History
- Opened: 16 December 1912; 113 years ago

Passengers
- FY2021: 241 daily

Services
Preceding station	Echigo TOKImeki	Following station
Uramoto towards Ichiburi	Nihonkai Hisui Line	Tsutsuishi towards Naoetsu
Location
- Location within Niigata Prefecture Location within Chubu region Location within Japan

Nō Station (能生駅, Nō-eki) is a railway station in the city of Itoigawa, Niigata, Japan, operated by Echigo Tokimeki Railway.

== Lines ==
Nō Station is served by the Nihonkai Hisui Line, and is 33.4 kilometers from the starting point of the line at Ichiburi and 327.9 kilometers from Maibara Station.

== Station layout ==
The station consists of two island platforms on an embankment, level with the second story of a two-story station building.

=== Platforms ===
1, 2	■ Nihonkai Hisui Line	for Naoetsu
3, 4	■ Nihonkai Hisui Line	for Itoigawa

== History ==
The station opened on 16 December 1912, as part of the Japanese Government Railways (JGR, JNR after 1949). It was relocated to its present location of 1 October 1961.

From 14 March 2015, with the opening of the Hokuriku Shinkansen extension from Nagano to Kanazawa, local passenger operations over sections of the Shinetsu Main Line and Hokuriku Main Line running roughly parallel to the new shinkansen line were reassigned to third-sector railway operating companies. From this date, Nō Station was transferred to the ownership of the third-sector operating company Echigo Tokimeki Railway.

== Passenger statistics ==
In fiscal 2017, the station was used by an average of 331 passengers daily (boarding passengers only).

== See also ==
- List of railway stations in Japan
