= Arimagawa Station =

Railway station in Joetsu, Niigata prefecture, Japan

Arimagawa Station 有間川駅
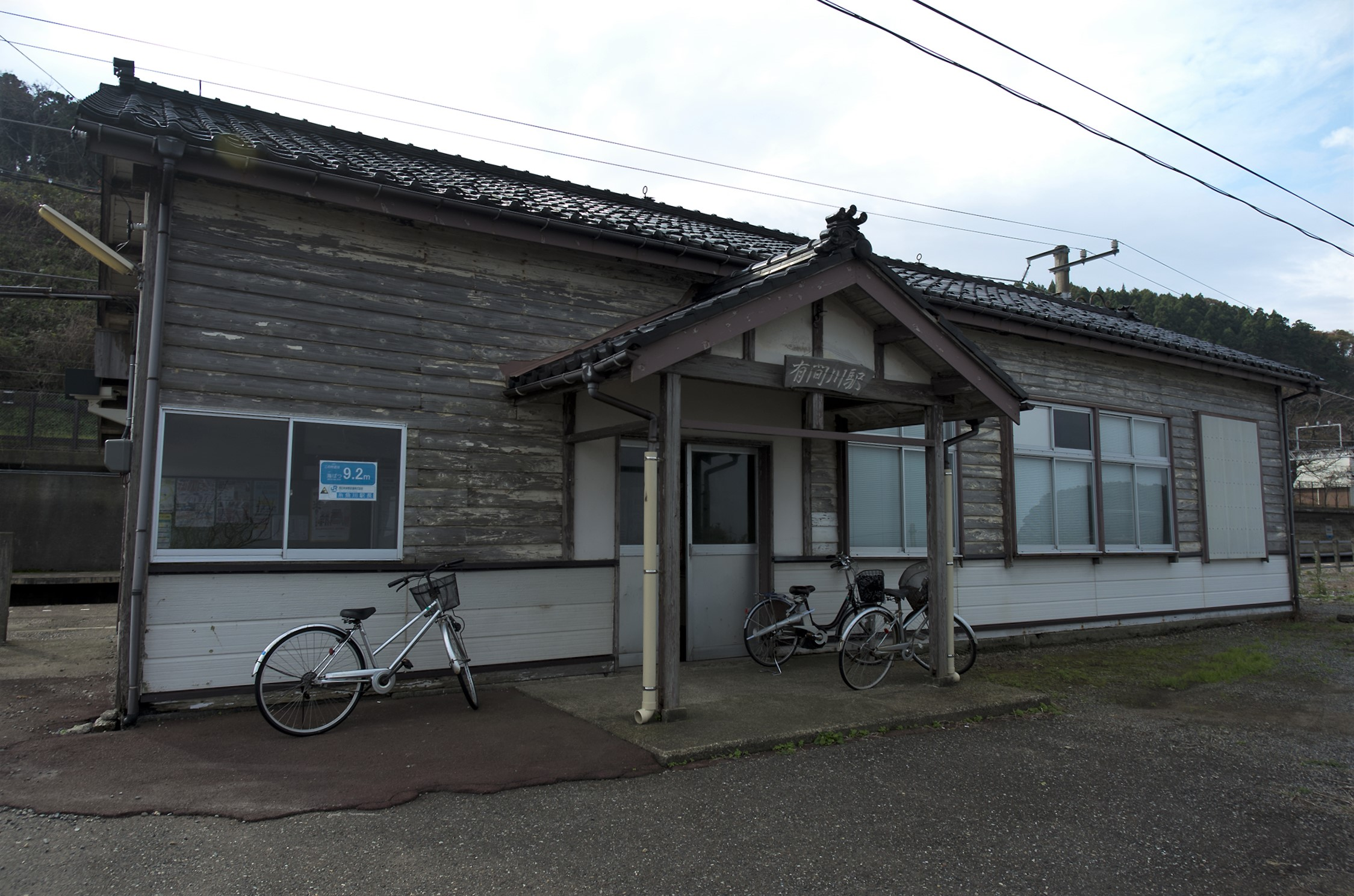
- Arimagawa Station in November 2013

General information
- Location: 1075 Hiranuma, Arimagawa, Jōetsu-shi, Niigata-ken 949-1702; Japan
- Coordinates: 37.1632°N 138.1363°E
- Operator: Echigo Tokimeki Railway
- Line: ■ Nihonkai Hisui Line
- Distance: 49.3 km from Ichiburi
- Platforms: 2 side platforms
- Tracks: 2

Other information
- Status: Unstaffed

History
- Opened: 1 July 1947

Passengers
- FY2017: 15
Location
- Location within Japan

Arimagawa Station (有間川駅, Arimagawa-eki) is a railway station on the Echigo Tokimeki Railway Nihonkai Hisui Line in the city of Jōetsu, Niigata, Japan, operated by the third-sector railway operator Echigo Tokimeki Railway.

== Lines ==
Arimagawa Station is served by the Echigo Tokimeki Railway Nihonkai Hisui Line, and is 49.3 kilometers from the starting point of the line at Ichiburi and 343.8 kilometers from Maibara Station.

== Station layout ==
The station consists of two opposed ground-level side platforms, connected by a level crossing. The station is unattended.

=== Platforms ===
| Station side | ■ Nihonkai Hisui Line | for Naoetsu |
| Opposite side | ■ Nihonkai Hisui Line | for Itoigawa |

== Adjacent stations ==
| « | Service | » |
Nihonkai Hisui Line
Rapid: Does not stop at this station
| Nadachi | Local | Tanihama |

== History ==
The station opened on 1 July 1947. With the privatization of Japanese National Railways (JNR) on 1 April 1987, the station came under the control of JR West. From 14 March 2015, with the opening of the Hokuriku Shinkansen extension from Nagano to Kanazawa, local passenger operations over sections of the Shinetsu Main Line and Hokuriku Main Line running roughly parallel to the new shinkansen line were reassigned to third-sector railway operating companies. From this date, Arimagawa Station was transferred to the ownership of the third-sector operating company Echigo Tokimeki Railway.

== Passenger statistics ==
In fiscal 2017, the station was used by an average of 15 passengers daily (boarding passengers only).

== Surrounding area ==
- Arimagawa fishing port
- National Route 8

== See also ==
- List of railway stations in Japan
