= Uramoto Station =

Railway station in Itoigawa, Niigata prefecture, Japan

Uramoto Station 浦本駅
- Uramoto Station in July 2017

General information
- Location: Mawaki, Itoigawa-shi, Niigata-ken 941-0001; Japan
- Coordinates: 37.0741°N 137.9394°E
- Operator: Echigo Tokimeki Railway
- Line: ■ Nihonkai Hisui Line
- Distance: 28.3 km from Ichiburi
- Platforms: 2 side platforms
- Tracks: 2

Other information
- Status: Unstaffed

History
- Opened: 28 January 1950

Passengers
- FY2017: 11 daily

Services
Preceding station	Echigo TOKImeki	Following station
Kajiyashiki towards Ichiburi	Nihonkai Hisui Line	Nō towards Naoetsu
Location
- Location within Japan

Uramoto Station (浦本駅, Uramoto-eki) is a railway station in the city of Itoigawa, Niigata, Japan, operated by Echigo Tokimeki Railway.

== Lines ==
Uramoto Station is served by the Nihonkai Hisui Line, and is 28.3 kilometers from the starting point of the line at Ichiburi and 322.8 kilometers from Maibara Station.

== Station layout ==
The station consists of two opposed side platforms on an embankment, with the station building at ground level. The station is unattended.

=== Platforms ===
Station side	■ Nihonkai Hisui Line	for Naoetsu
Opposite side	■ Nihonkai Hisui Line	for Itoigawa

== History ==
The station opened on 28 January 1950, as part of the Japan National Railways (JNR). From 14 March 2015, with the opening of the Hokuriku Shinkansen extension from Nagano to Kanazawa, local passenger operations over sections of the Shinetsu Main Line and Hokuriku Main Line running roughly parallel to the new shinkansen line were reassigned to third-sector railway operating companies. From this date, Uramoto Station was transferred to the ownership of the third-sector operating company Echigo Tokimeki Railway.

== Passenger statistics ==
In fiscal 2017, the station was used by an average of 11 passengers daily (boarding passengers only).

== See also ==
- List of railway stations in Japan
