= Tanihama Station =

Railway station in Joetsu, Niigata prefecture, Japan

Tanihama Station 谷浜駅
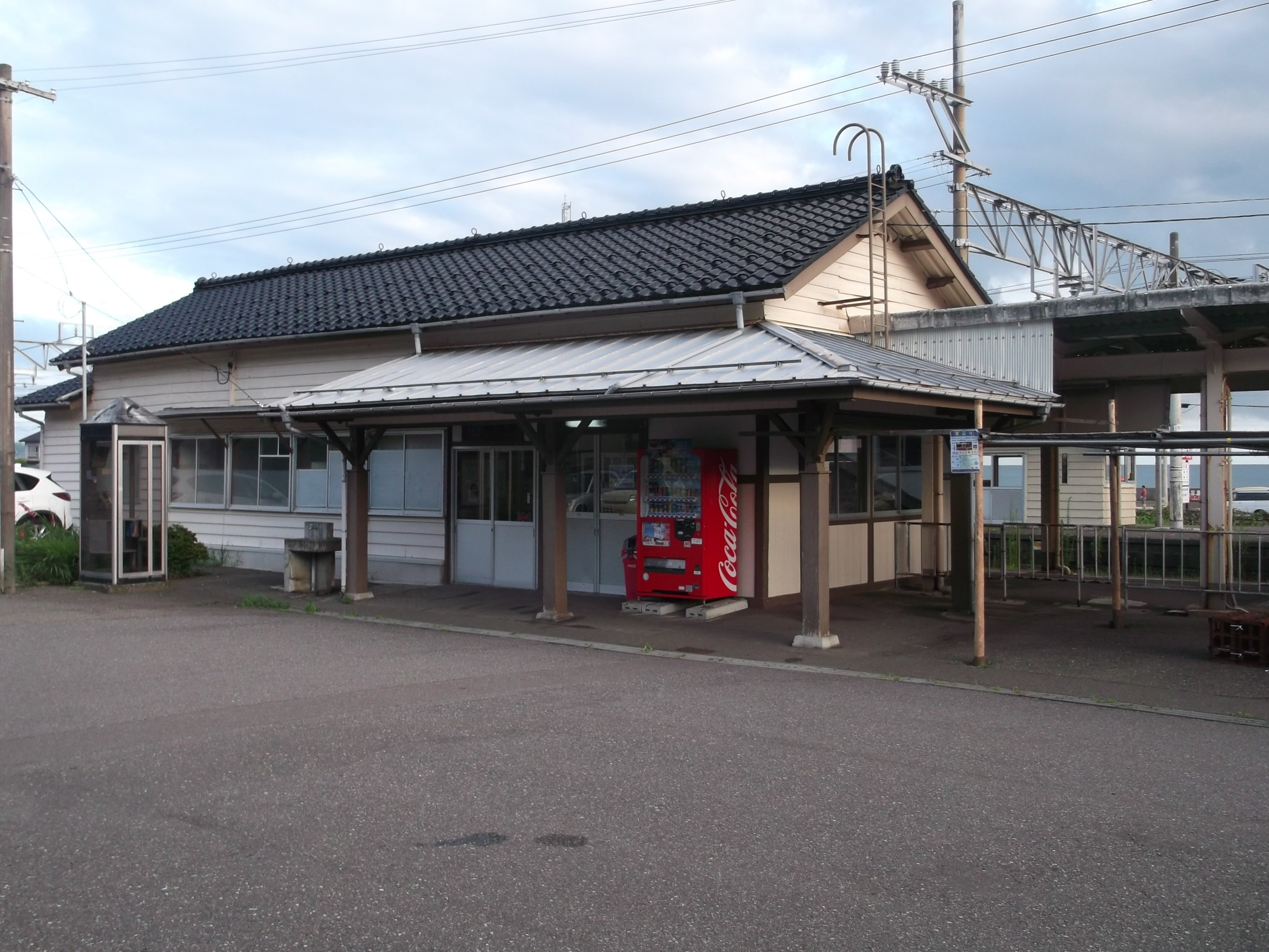
- Tanihama Station in August 2013

General information
- Location: 112 Ie-no-shita, Nagahama, Jōetsu-shi, Niigata-ken 949-1701; Japan
- Coordinates: 37.1622°N 138.1740°E
- Operator: Echigo Tokimeki Railway
- Line: ■ Nihonkai Hisui Line
- Distance: 52.7 km from Ichiburi
- Platforms: 1 side + 1 island platform
- Tracks: 3

Other information
- Status: Unstaffed

History
- Opened: 1 July 1911

Passengers
- FY2015: 26 daily
Location
- Location within Japan

Tanihama Station (谷浜駅, Tanihama-eki) is a railway station on the Echigo Tokimeki Railway Nihonkai Hisui Line in the city of Jōetsu, Niigata, Japan, operated by the third-sector railway operator Echigo Tokimeki Railway.

== Lines ==
Tanihama Station is served by the Echigo Tokimeki Railway Nihonkai Hisui Line, and is 52.7 kilometers from the starting point of the line at Ichiburi and 347.2 kilometers from Maibara Station.

== Station layout ==
The station consists of one side platform and one island platform, connected by a footbridge; however, one side of the island platform is not used. The station is unattended.

=== Platforms ===
1	■ Nihonkai Hisui Line	for Itoigawa
2	■ Nihonkai Hisui Line	(not in use)
3	■ Nihonkai Hisui Line	for Naoetsu

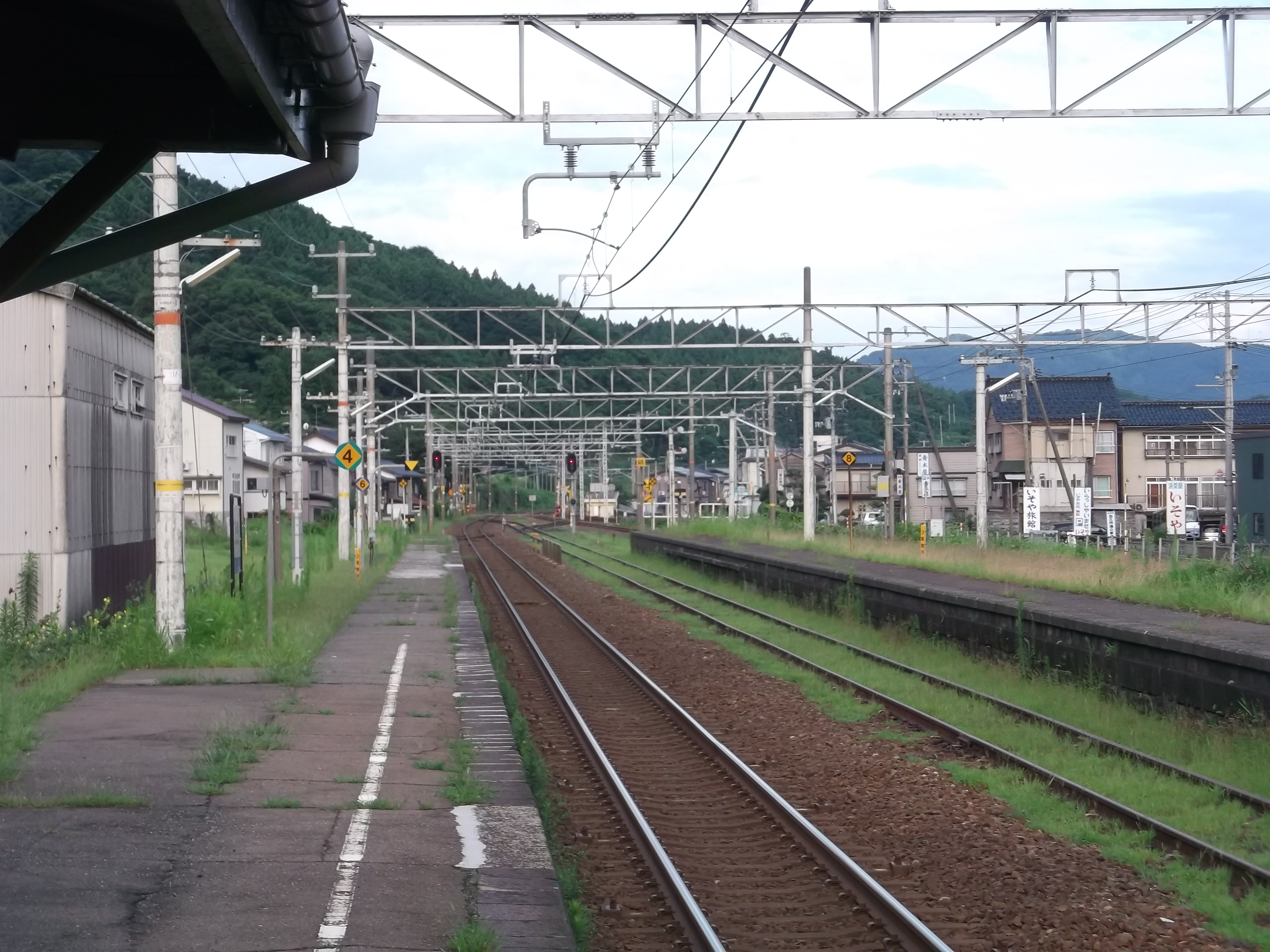
The view from platform 1 in August 2013 looking toward Arimagawa

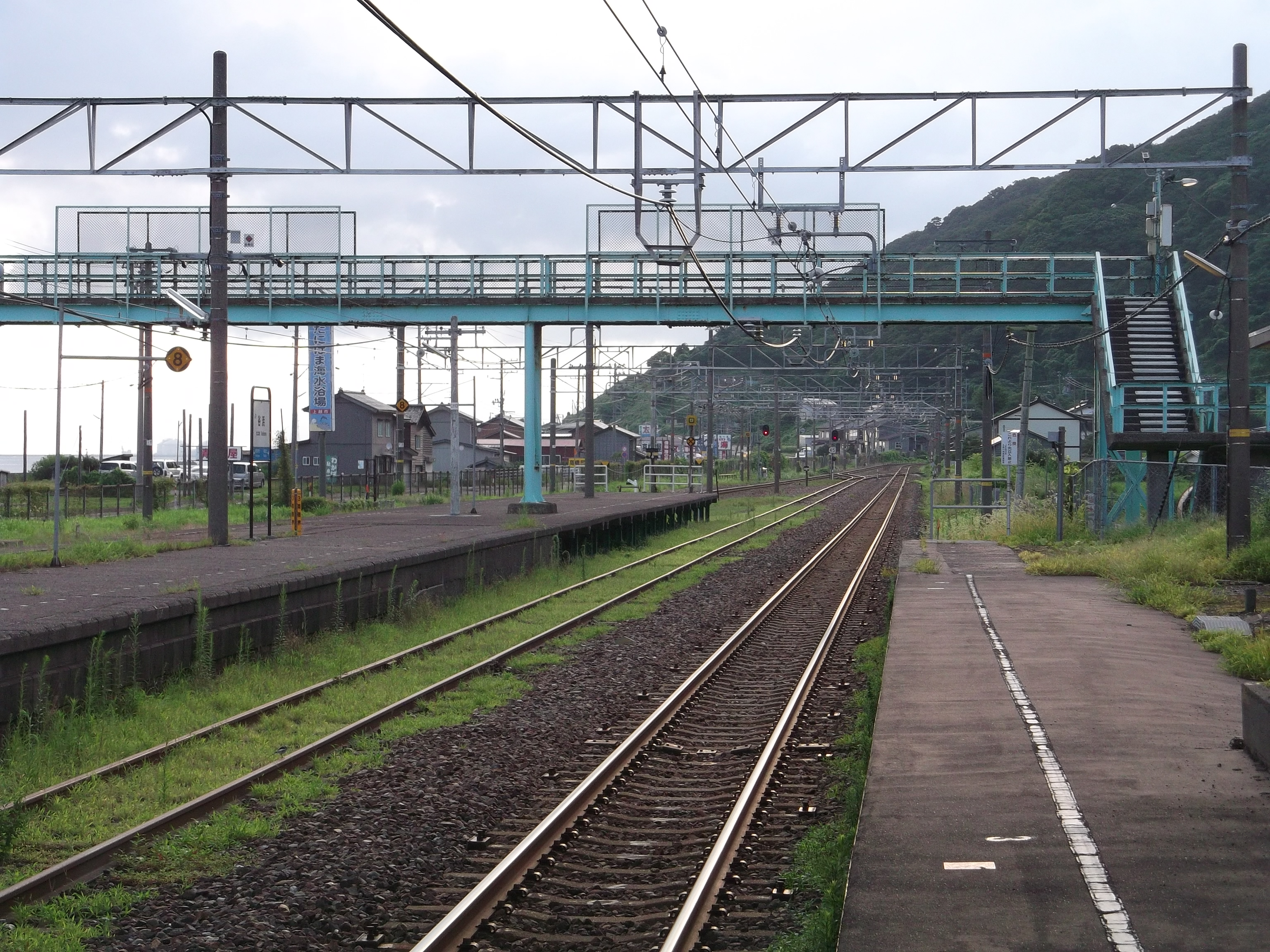
The view from platform 1 in August 2013 looking toward Naoetsu

== Adjacent stations ==
«	Service	»
Nihonkai Hisui Line
Rapid: Does not stop at this station
Arimagawa	Local	Naoetsu

== History ==
The station opened on 1 July 1911. With the privatization of Japanese National Railways (JNR) on 1 April 1987, the station came under the control of JR West. From 14 March 2015, with the opening of the Hokuriku Shinkansen extension from Nagano to Kanazawa, local passenger operations over sections of the Shinetsu Main Line and Hokuriku Main Line running roughly parallel to the new shinkansen line were reassigned to third-sector railway operating companies. From this date, Tanihama Station was transferred to the ownership of the third-sector operating company Echigo Tokimeki Railway.

== Passenger statistics ==
In fiscal 2017, the station was used by an average of 21 passengers daily (boarding passengers only).

== Surrounding area ==
- Tanihama Beach
- Tanihama Post Office
- National Route 8

== See also ==
- List of railway stations in Japan
