= Tsutsuishi Station =

Railway station in Itoigawa, Japan

Tsutsuishi Station 筒石駅
- Tsutsuishi Station in July 2017

General information
- Location: 928 Otani, Senno, Itoigawa City, Niigata Prefecture 949-1302; Japan
- Coordinates: 37.1276°N 138.0606°E
- Operator: Echigo TOKImeki
- Line: Nihonkai Hisui Line
- Platforms: 2 side platforms
- Tracks: 2

Construction
- Structure type: Underground

Other information
- Status: Unstaffed

History
- Opened: 16 December 1912; 113 years ago

Passengers
- FY2021: 17 daily

Services
Preceding station	Echigo TOKImeki	Following station
Nō towards Ichiburi	Nihonkai Hisui Line	Nadachi towards Naoetsu
Location
- Location within Niigata Prefecture Location within Chubu region Location within Japan

Tsutsuishi Station (筒石駅, Tsutsuishi-eki) is a railway station in Itoigawa, Niigata, Japan, operated by Echigo Tokimeki Railway.

== Lines ==
Tsutsuishi Station is served by the Nihonkai Hisui Line, and is 40.9 kilometres (25.4 mi) from the starting point of the line at Ichiburi and 335.4 kilometres (208.4 mi) from Maibara Station.

== Station layout ==
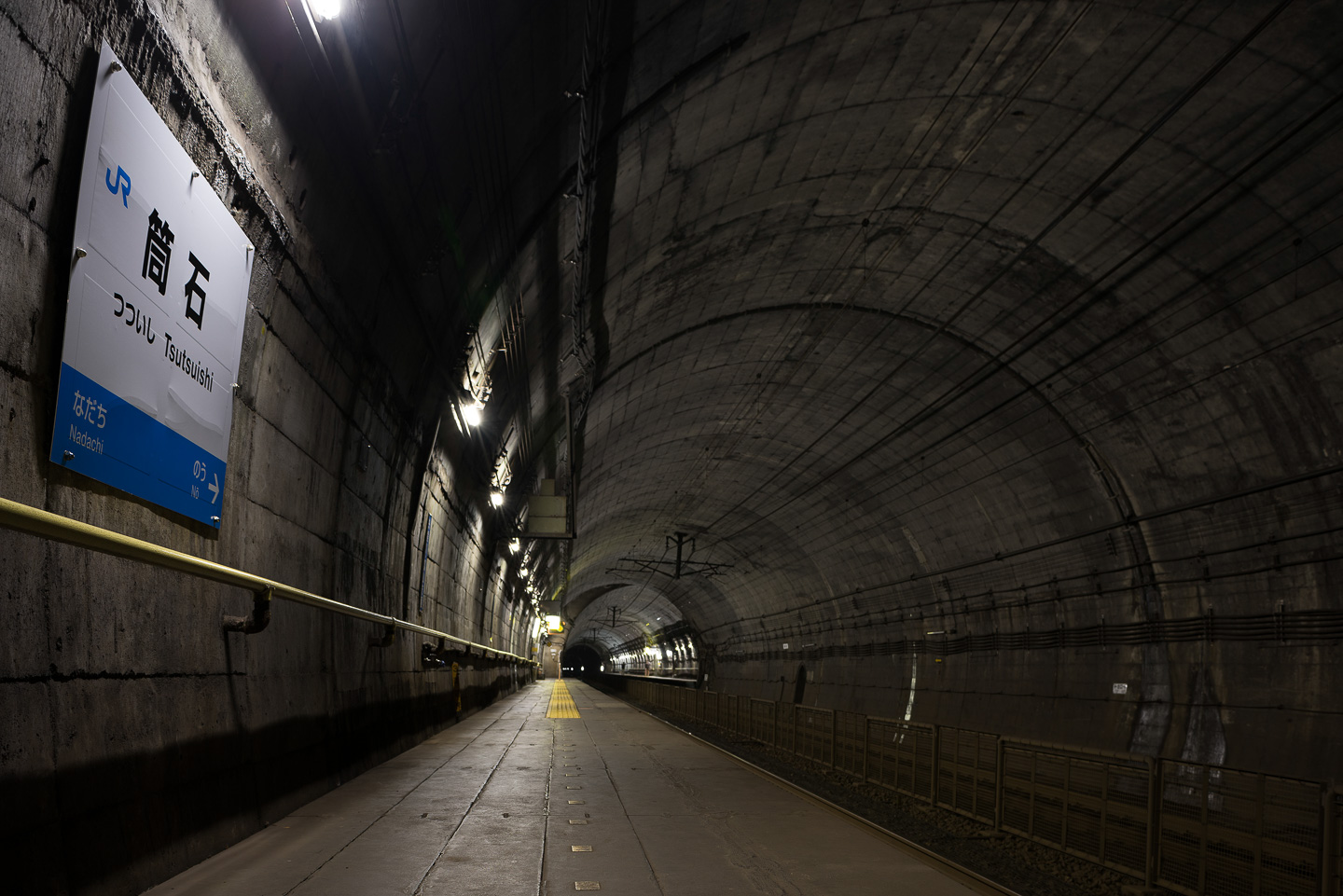
Platforms in the tunnel during JR West ownership

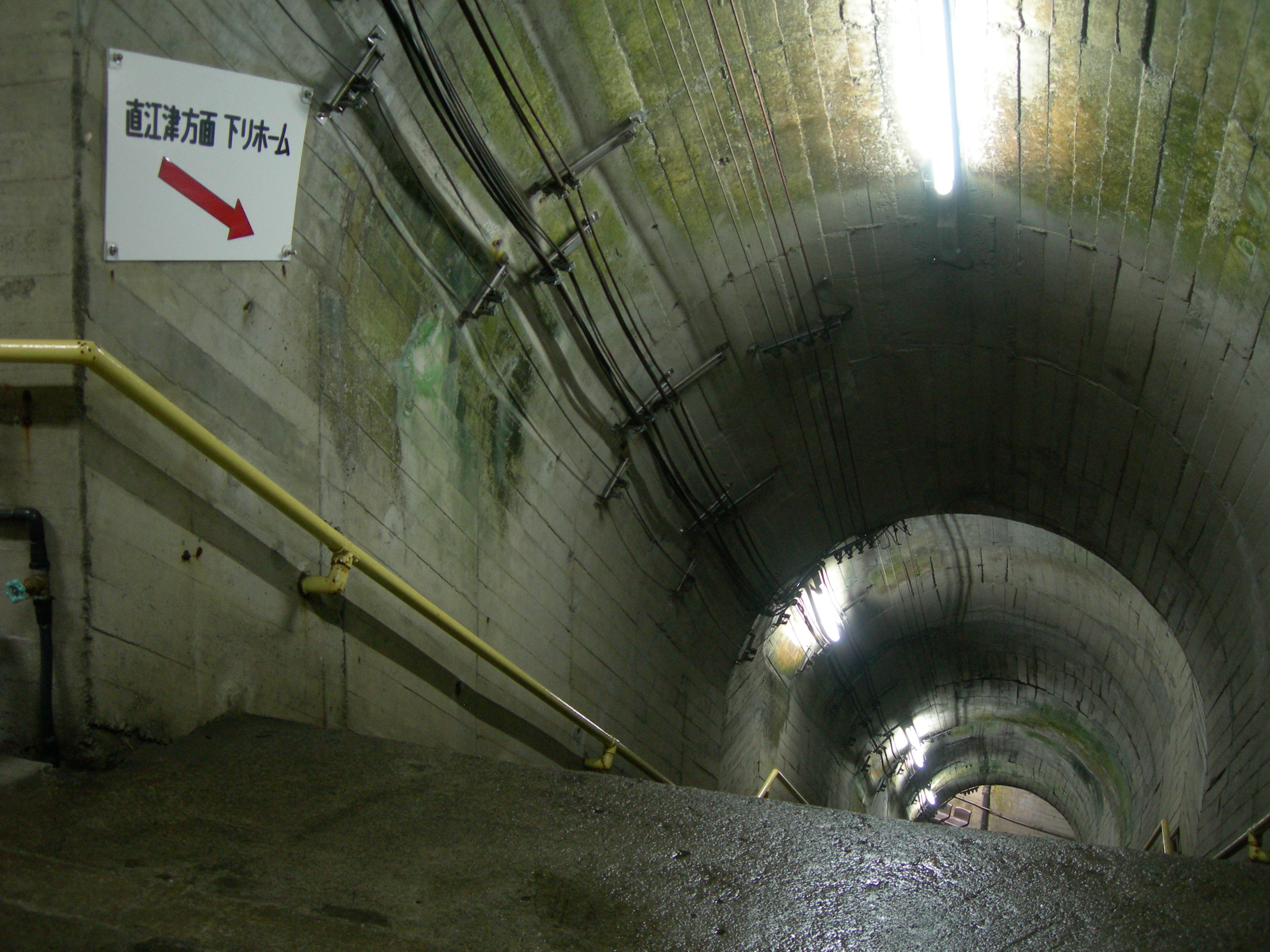
Stairs to the platform

The station consists of two opposed side platforms located inside the 11,353 meters (37,247 ft) long Kubiki Tunnel, 40 meters (130 ft) below ground, connected to the entrance gate by 290 steps. There is only a stairway, with no elevator or escalator. Due to the air pressure generated by passing trains, access to the platform is limited and a protected waiting room with heavy metal doors keep passengers safe from typhoon-like wind. Average daily ridership at this station is approximately 60, mostly students.

=== Platforms ===
west	■ Nihonkai Hisui Line	for Naoetsu
east	■ Nihonkai Hisui Line	for Itoigawa

== History ==
The station opened on December 16, 1912, as part of the Japanese Government Railways (JGR, JNR after 1949). On October 1, 1969, a new Tsutsuishi Station was opened. On April 1, 1987, with the privatization of JNR, JR West took over control of this station.

From 14 March 2015, with the opening of the Hokuriku Shinkansen extension from Nagano to Kanazawa, local passenger operations over sections of the Shinetsu Main Line and Hokuriku Main Line running roughly parallel to the new Shinkansen line were reassigned to third-sector railway operating companies. From this date, Tsutsuishi Station was transferred to the ownership of the third-sector operating company Echigo Tokimeki Railway.

== Passenger statistics ==
In fiscal 2017, the station was used by an average of 23 passengers daily (boarding passengers only).

== Surrounding area ==
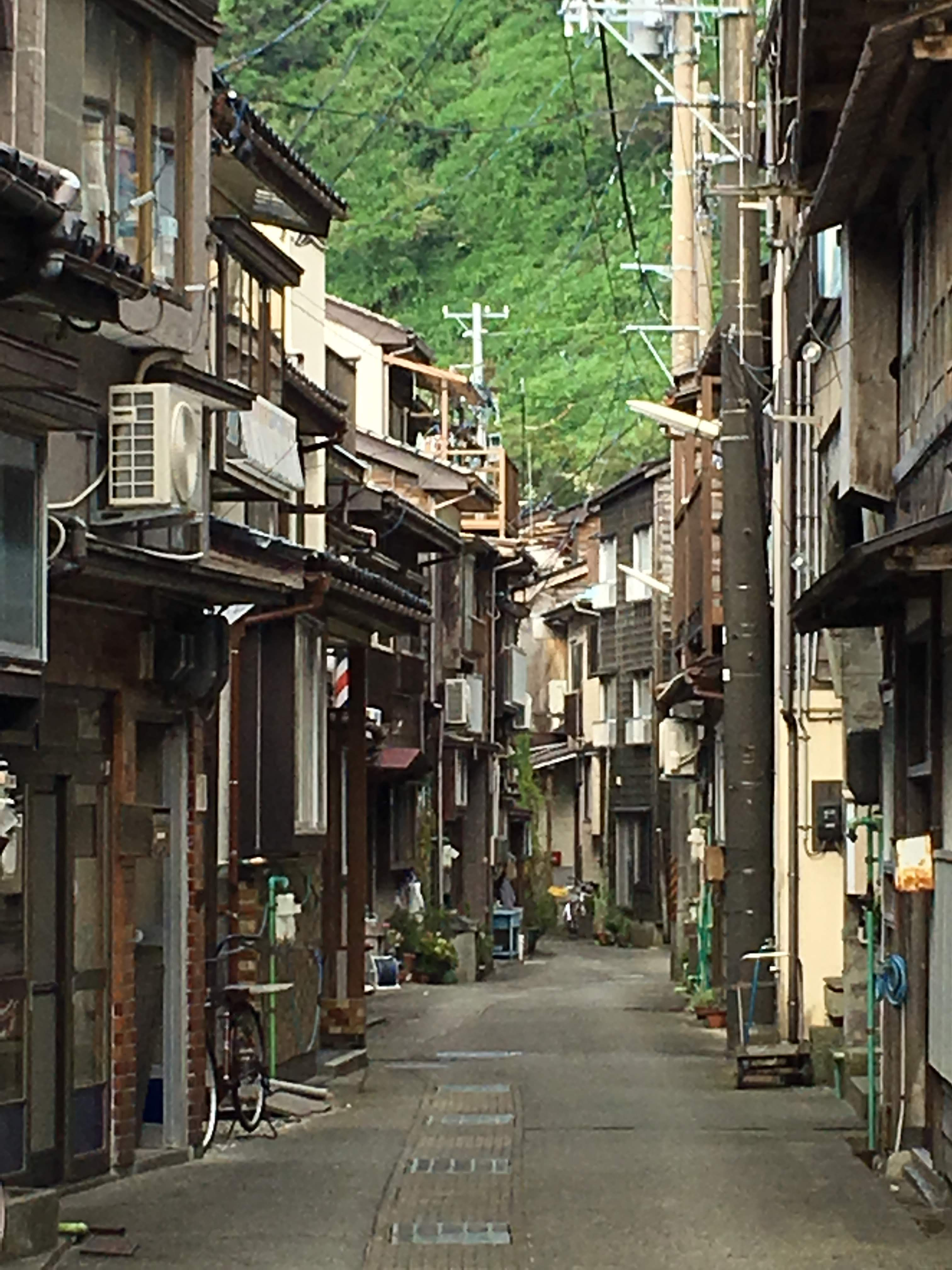
Townscape of Tsutsuishi

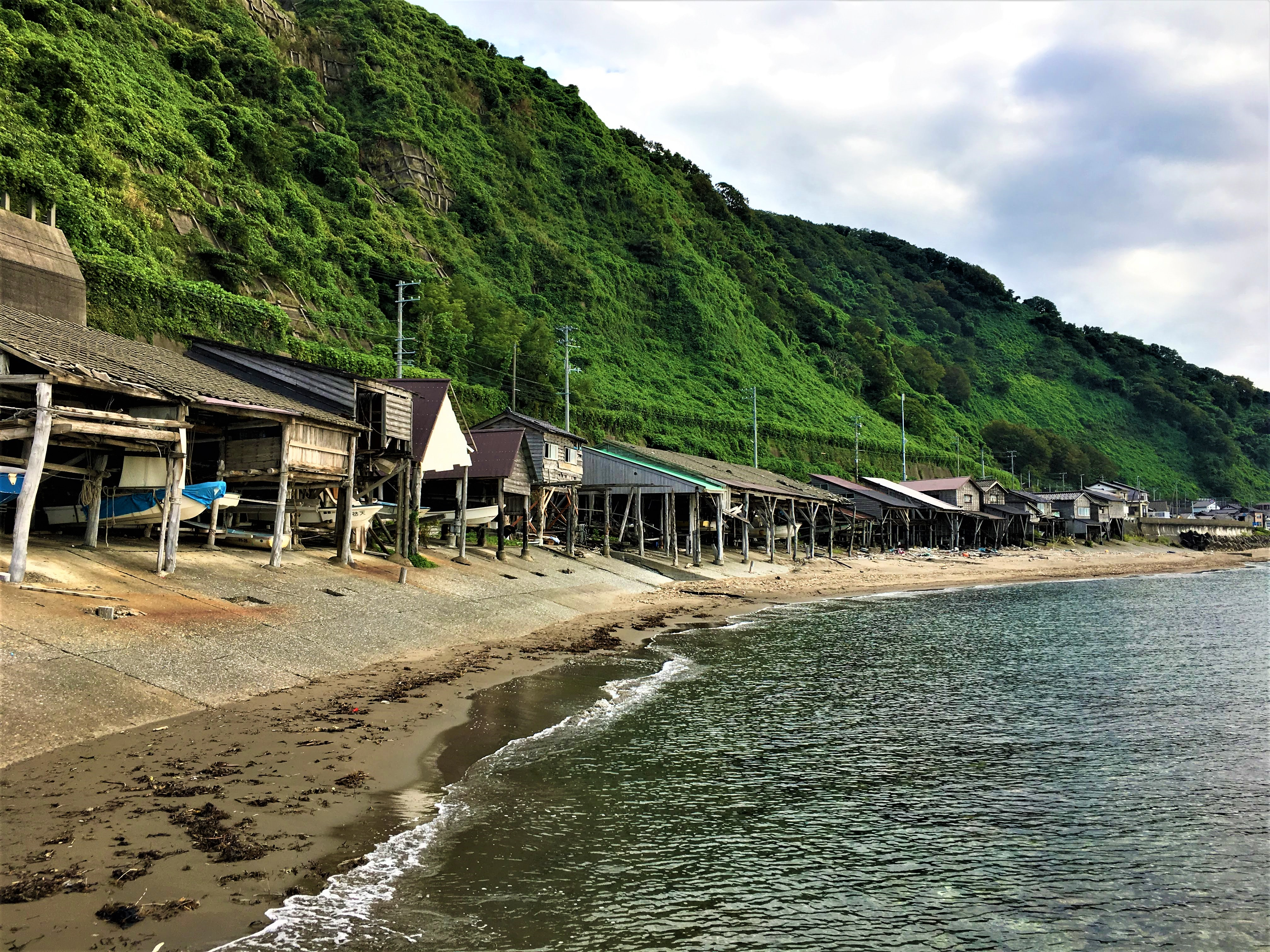
Tsutsuishi funaya

- Tsutsuishi fishing port
- Tsutsuishi Post Office
- Isobe Elementary School

== Gallery ==
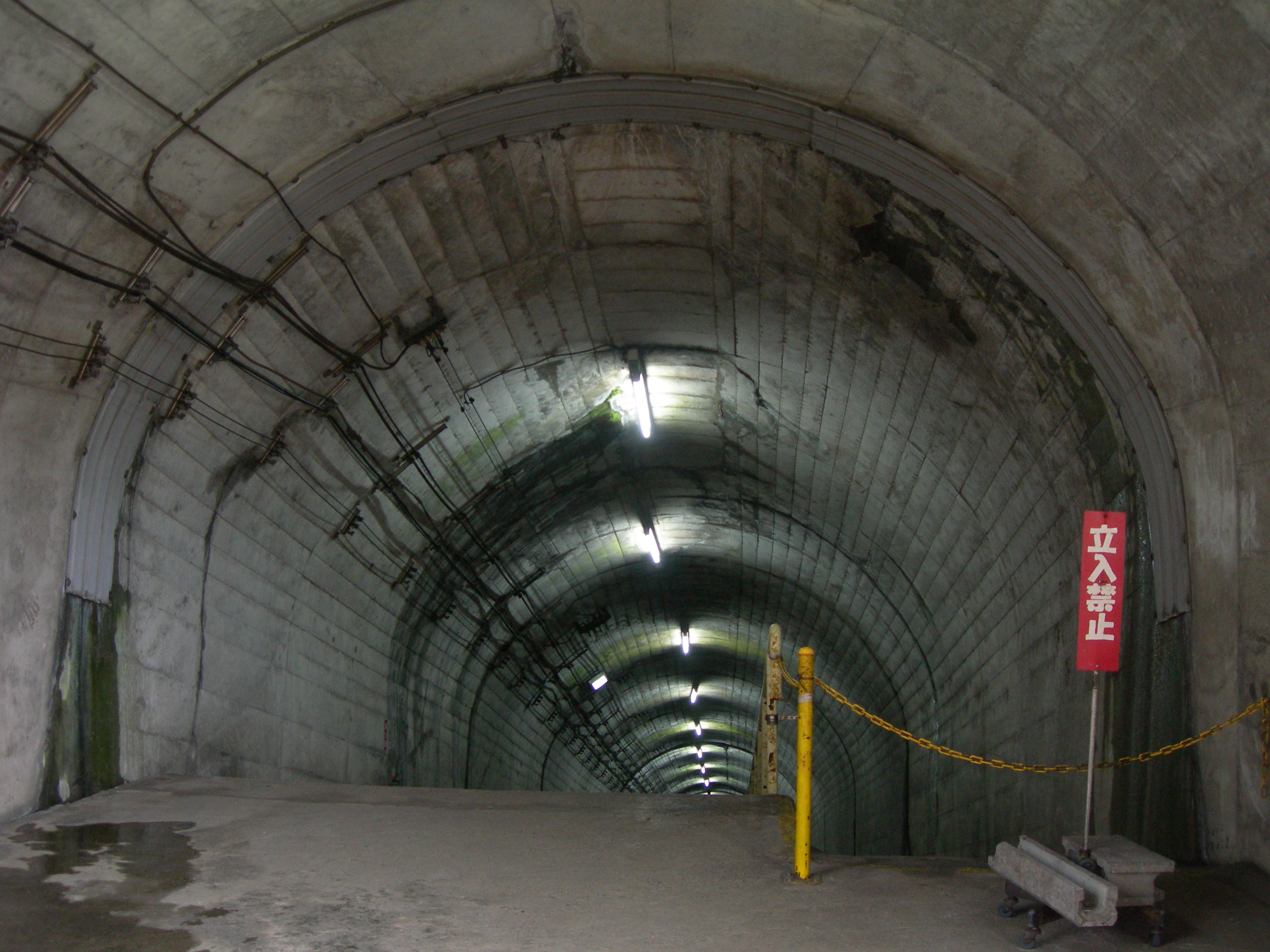
March 2010

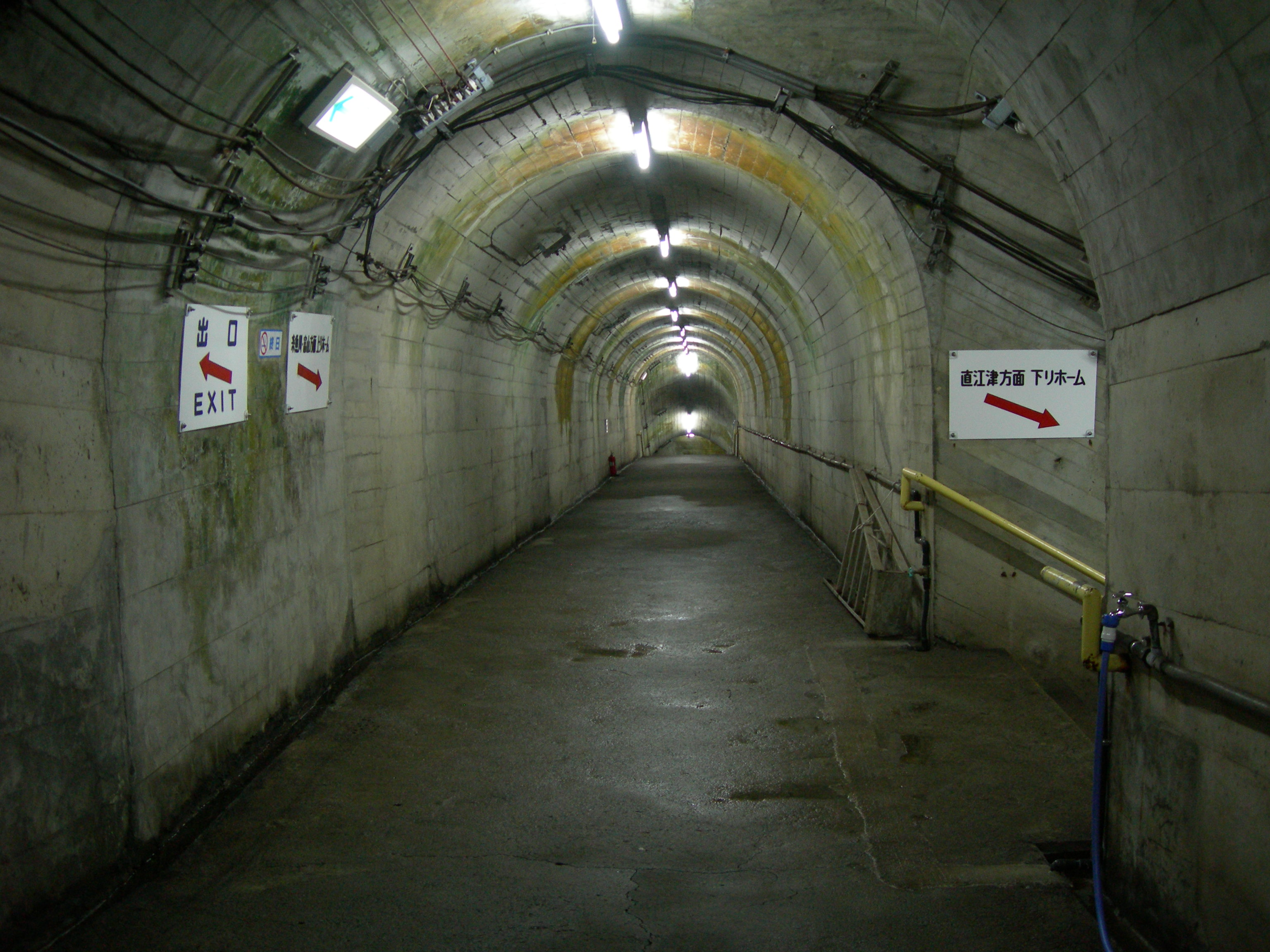
Branch between Lower and upper platforms, March 2010

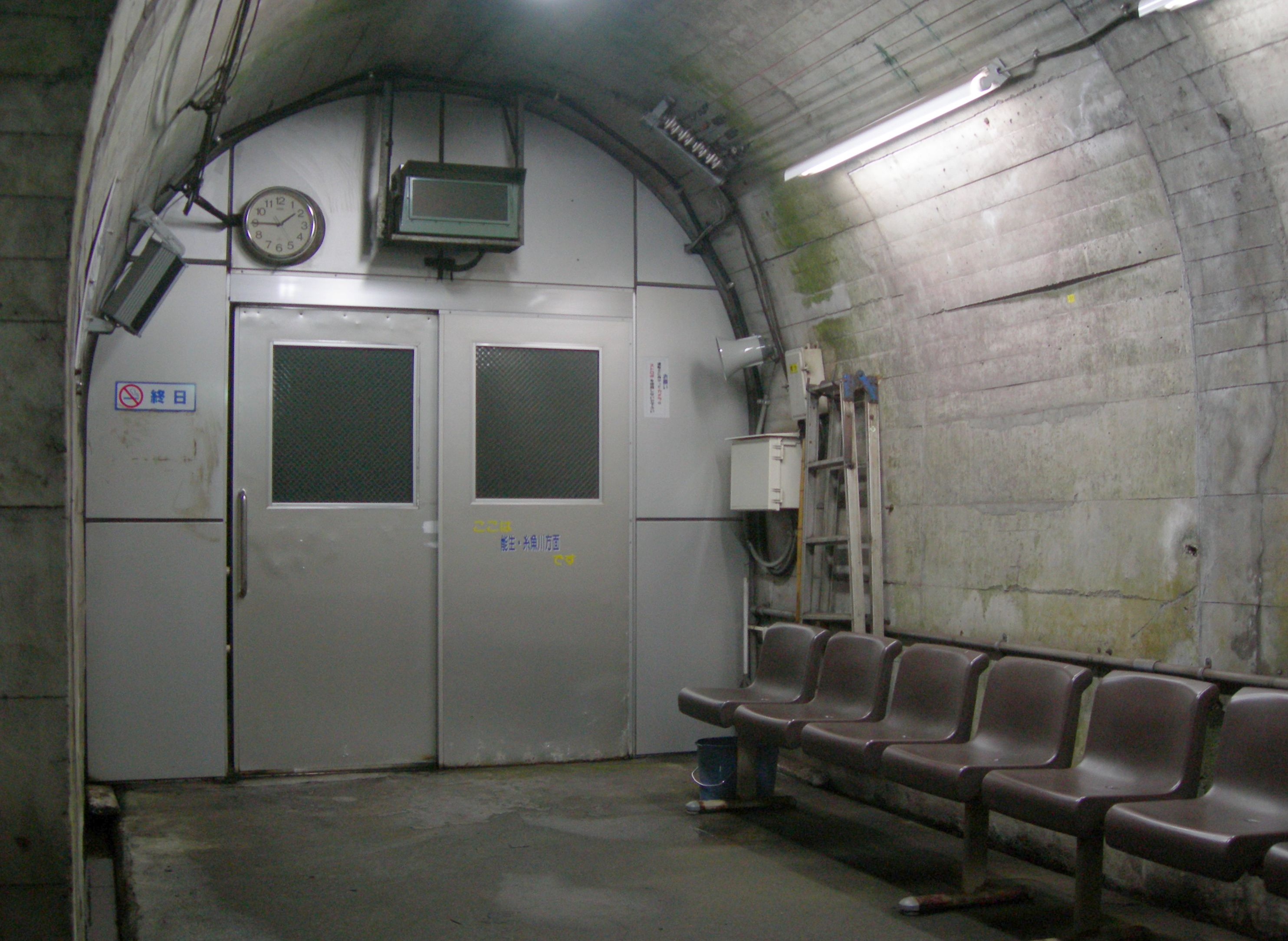
Platform waiting room. When trains arrive, the display turns on and sounds are alarmed, March 2010

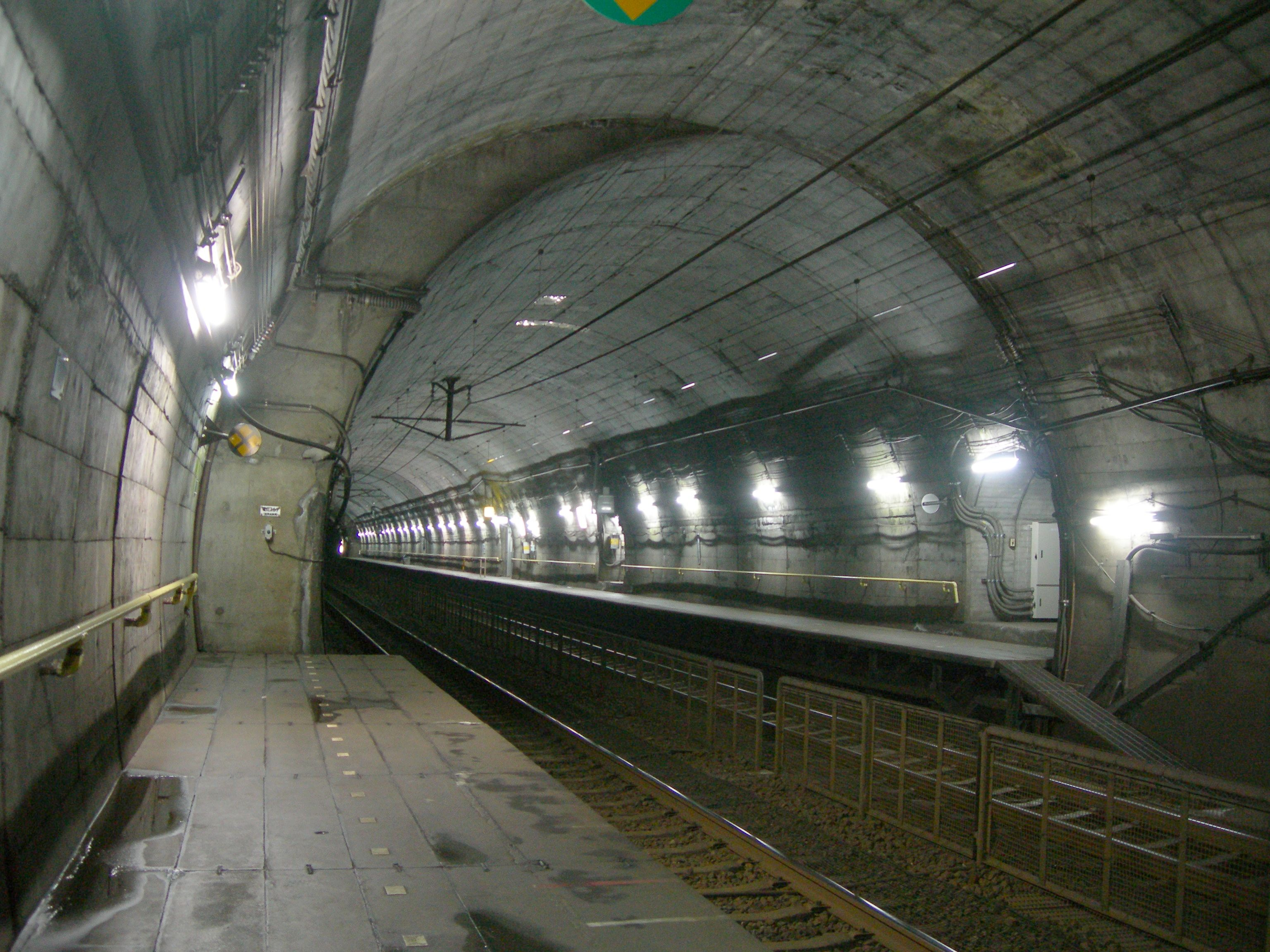
Platform for Naoetsu, March 2010

== See also ==
- List of railway stations in Japan
