= Kajiyashiki Station =

Railway station in Itoigawa, Japan

Kajiyashiki Station 梶屋敷駅
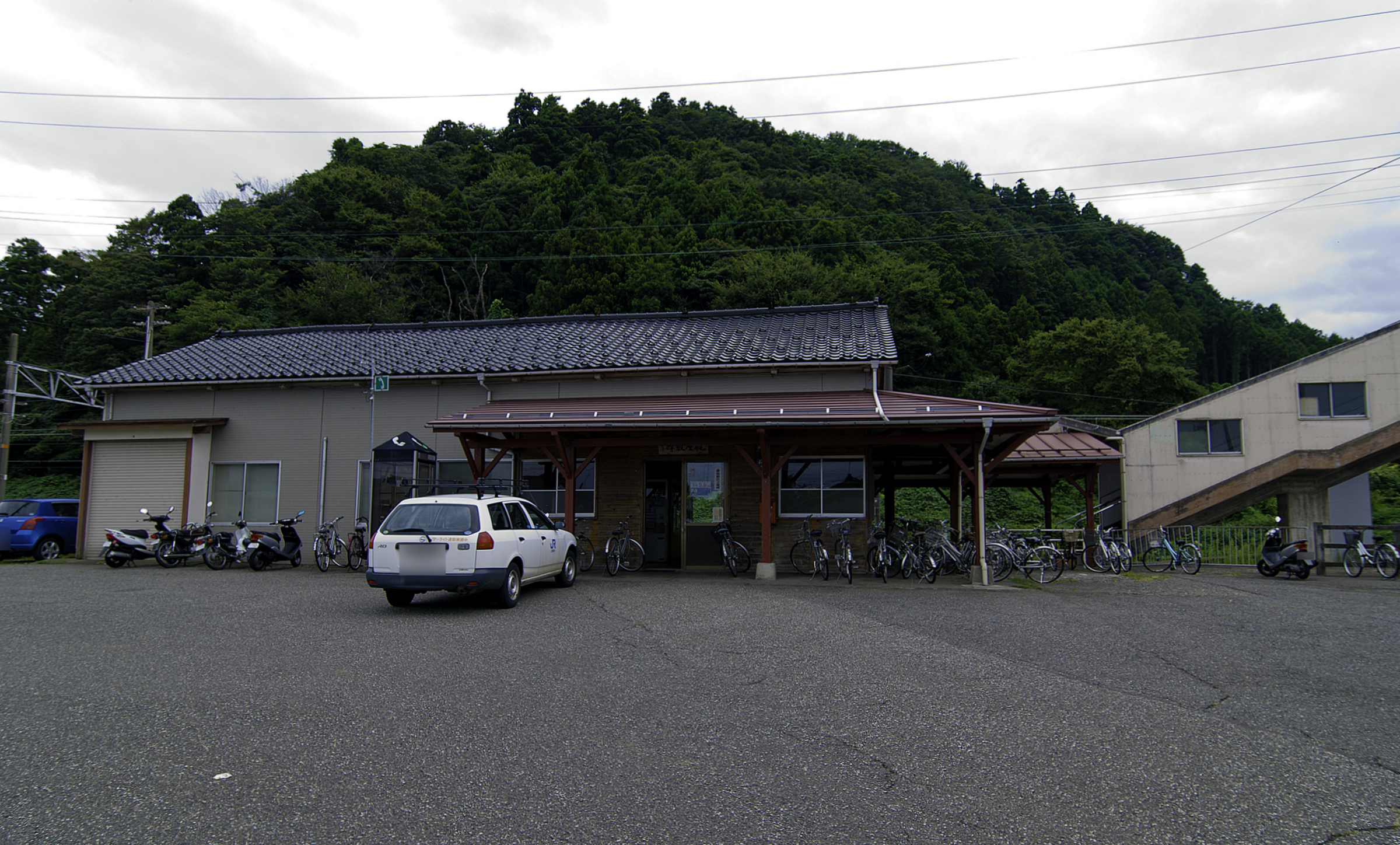
- Kajiyashiki Station in September 2011

General information
- Location: Tabuse, Itoigawa-shi, Niigata-ken 941-0008; Japan
- Coordinates: 37.0566°N 137.9056°E
- Operator: Echigo Tokimeki Railway
- Line: ■ Nihonkai Hisui Line
- Platforms: 2 island platforms
- Tracks: 2

Other information
- Status: Unstaffed

History
- Opened: 16 December 1912

Passengers
- FY2017: 49 daily

Services
Preceding station	Echigo TOKImeki	Following station
Echigo Oshiage Hisui Kaigan towards Ichiburi	Nihonkai Hisui Line	Uramoto towards Naoetsu
Location
- Location within Japan

Kajiyashiki Station (梶屋敷駅, Kajiyashiki-eki) is a railway station in the city of Itoigawa, Niigata, Japan, operated by Echigo Tokimeki Railway.

== Lines ==
Kajiyashiki Station is served by the Nihonkai Hisui Line, and is 24.8 kilometers from the starting point of the line at Ichiburi and 319.3 kilometers from Maibara Station.

== Station layout ==
The station consists of one side platform and one island platform, of which only one side is in use. The station is unattended.

=== Platforms ===
station side	■ Nihonkai Hisui Line	for Naoetsu
opposite side	■ Nihonkai Hisui Line	for Itoigawa

== History ==
The station opened on 16 December 1912, as part of the Japanese Government Railways (JGR, JNR after 1949). From 14 March 2015, with the opening of the Hokuriku Shinkansen extension from Nagano to Kanazawa, local passenger operations over sections of the Shinetsu Main Line and Hokuriku Main Line running roughly parallel to the new shinkansen line were reassigned to third-sector railway operating companies. From this date, Kajiyashiki Station was transferred to the ownership of the third-sector operating company Echigo Tokimeki Railway.

== Passenger statistics ==
In fiscal 2017, the station was used by an average of 49 passengers daily (boarding passengers only).

== Surrounding area ==
- Kajiyashiki Post Office

National Route 8

- Itoigawa Higashi Junior School

== See also ==
- List of railway stations in Japan
