= Oyashirazu Station =

Railway station in Itoigawa, Japan

Oyashirazu Station 親不知駅
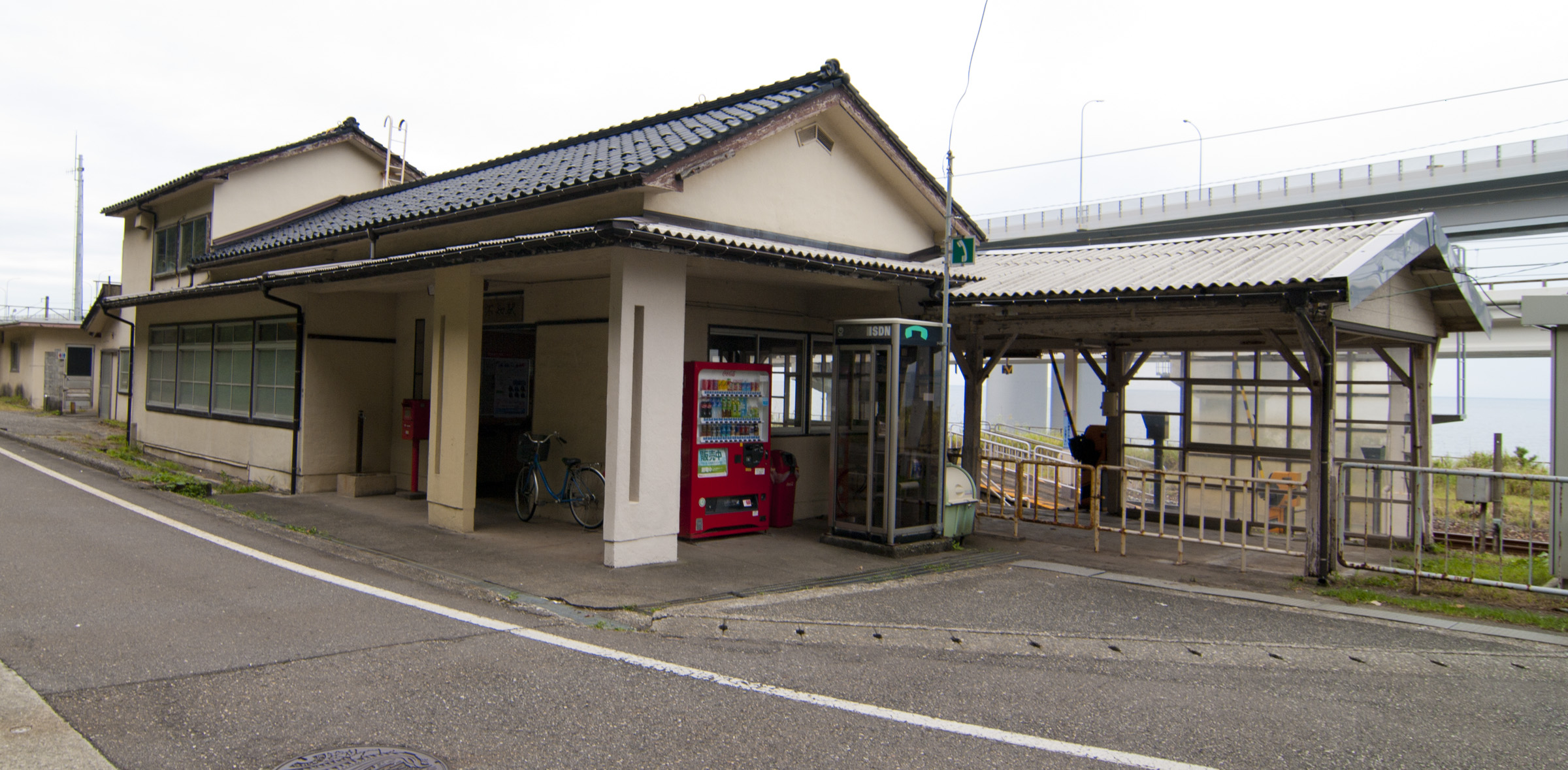
- Oyashirazu Station in September 2011

General information
- Location: Uta, Itoigawa-shi, Niigata-ken 949-0307; Japan
- Coordinates: 37.0069°N 137.7380°E
- Operator: Echigo Tokimeki Railway
- Line: ■ Nihonkai Hisui Line
- Distance: 8.6 km from Ichiburi
- Platforms: 1 island platform

History
- Opened: 16 December 1912

Passengers
- FY2017: 18

Services
Preceding station	Echigo TOKImeki	Following station
Ichiburi Terminus	Nihonkai Hisui Line	Ōmi towards Naoetsu
Location
- Location within Japan

Oyashirazu Station (親不知駅, Oyashirazu-eki) is a railway station in Itoigawa, Niigata, Japan, operated by Echigo Tokimeki Railway.

== Lines ==
Oyashirazu Station is served by the Nihonkai Hisui Line, and is 8.6 kilometers from the terminus of the line at Ichiburi and 303.1 kilometers from Maibara Station.

== Station layout ==
The station consists of one island platform connected to the station building by a level crossing. The station is unattended.

=== Platforms ===
1	■ Nihonkai Hisui Line	for Tomari and Toyama
2	■ Nihonkai Hisui Line	for Itoigawa and Naoetsu

== History ==
The station opened on 16 December 1912, as part of the Japanese Government Railways (JGR, JNR after 1949). From 14 March 2015, with the opening of the Hokuriku Shinkansen extension from Nagano to Kanazawa, local passenger operations over sections of the Shinetsu Main Line and Hokuriku Main Line running roughly parallel to the new shinkansen line were reassigned to third-sector railway operating companies. From this date, Oyashirazu Station was transferred to the ownership of the third-sector operating company Echigo Tokimeki Railway.

== Passenger statistics ==
In fiscal 2015, the station was used by an average of 18 passengers daily (boarding passengers only).

== Surrounding area ==
- Oyashirazu Post Office
- Oyashirazu Swimming Beach

== See also ==
- List of railway stations in Japan
