= 青海駅 =

青海駅 is the name of multiple train stations in Japan:

- Aomi Station
- Ōmi Station (Niigata)
