= Kasugayama Station =

Railway station in Jōetsu, Niigata Prefecture, Japan

Kasugayama Station 春日山駅
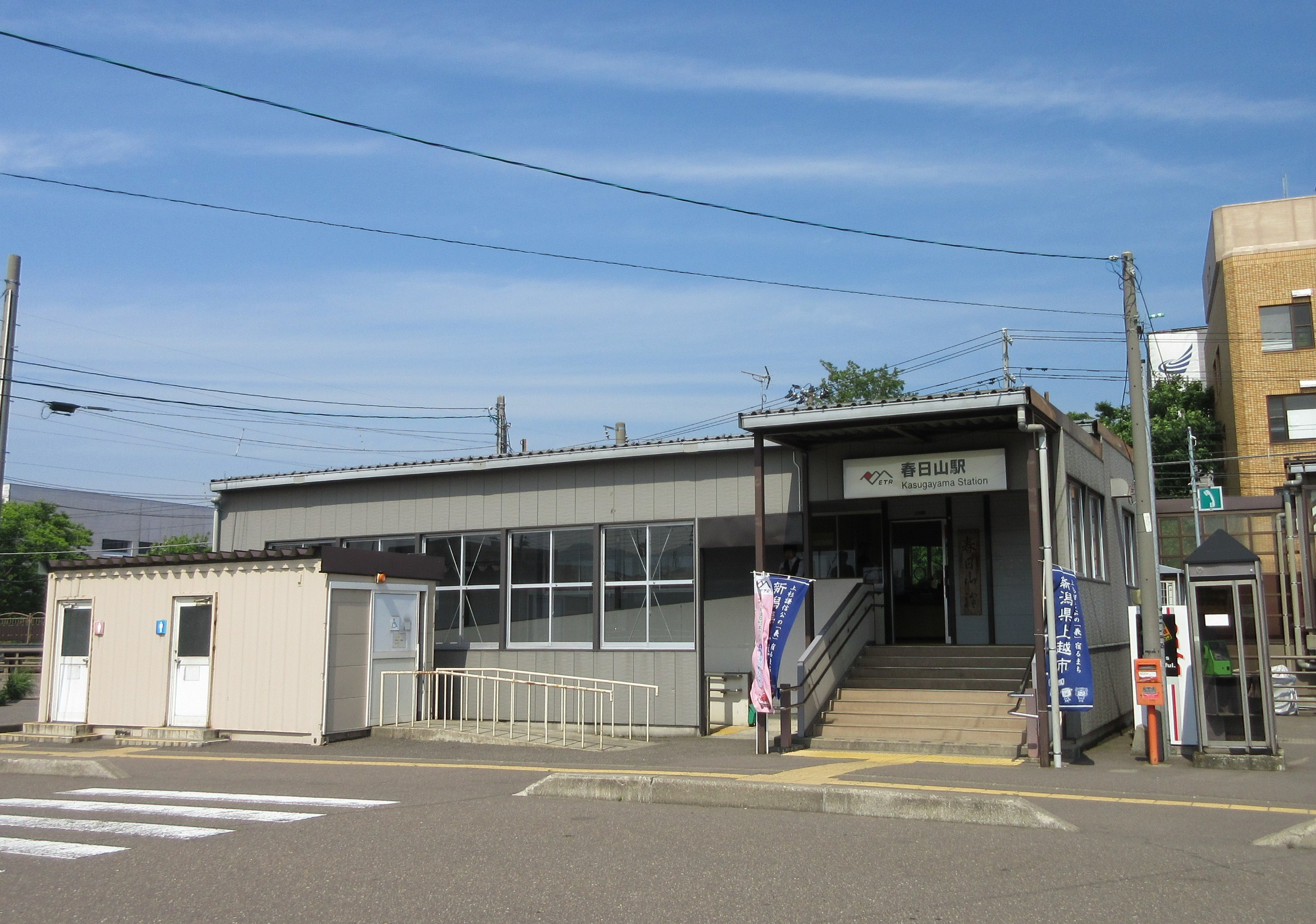
- Kasugayama Station in March 2015

General information
- Location: 3-1-1 Kasugayamamachi, Jōetsu-shi, Niigata-ken 943-0807; Japan
- Coordinates: 37.1481°N 138.2350°E
- Operator: Echigo Tokimeki Railway
- Line: ■ Myoko Haneuma Line
- Distance: 34.9 km from Myōkō-Kōgen
- Platforms: 1 side platform
- Tracks: 1

Other information
- Status: Staffed
- Website: Official website

History
- Opened: 26 October 1928

Passengers
- FY2017: 778 daily
Location
- Location within Myoko Haneuma Line Location within Japan

Kasugayama Station (春日山駅, Kasugayama-eki) is a railway station on the Echigo Tokimeki Railway Myōkō Haneuma Line in the city of Jōetsu, Niigata, Japan operated by the third-sector operator Echigo Tokimeki Railway.

== Lines ==
Kasugayama Station is served by the 37.7 km Echigo Tokimeki Railway Myōkō Haneuma Line from Myōkō-Kōgen to Naoetsu, and is located 34.9 kilometers from the starting point of the line at Myōkō-Kōgen and 72.2 kilometers from Nagano.

== Station layout ==
The station has one side platform serving a single bi-directional track.

== Adjacent stations ==
«	Service	»
Myōkō Haneuma Line
Shirayuki: Does not stop at this station
Takada	Local	Naoetsu

== History ==
The station opened on 26 October 1928. With the privatization of Japanese National Railways (JNR) on 1 April 1987, the station came under the control of JR East.

From 14 March 2015, with the opening of the Hokuriku Shinkansen extension from Nagano to Kanazawa, local passenger operations over sections of the Shinetsu Main Line and Hokuriku Main Line running roughly parallel to the new shinkansen line were reassigned to third-sector railway operating companies. From this date, Kasugayama Station was transferred to the ownership of the third-sector operating company Echigo Tokimeki Railway.

== Passenger statistics ==
In fiscal 2017, the station was used by an average of 778 passengers daily (boarding passengers only).

== Surrounding area ==
- Jōetsu City Office
- Site of Kasugayama Castle

== See also ==
- List of railway stations in Japan
