= Ōmi Station (Niigata) =

Railway station in Itoigawa, Japan

Ōmi Station 青海駅
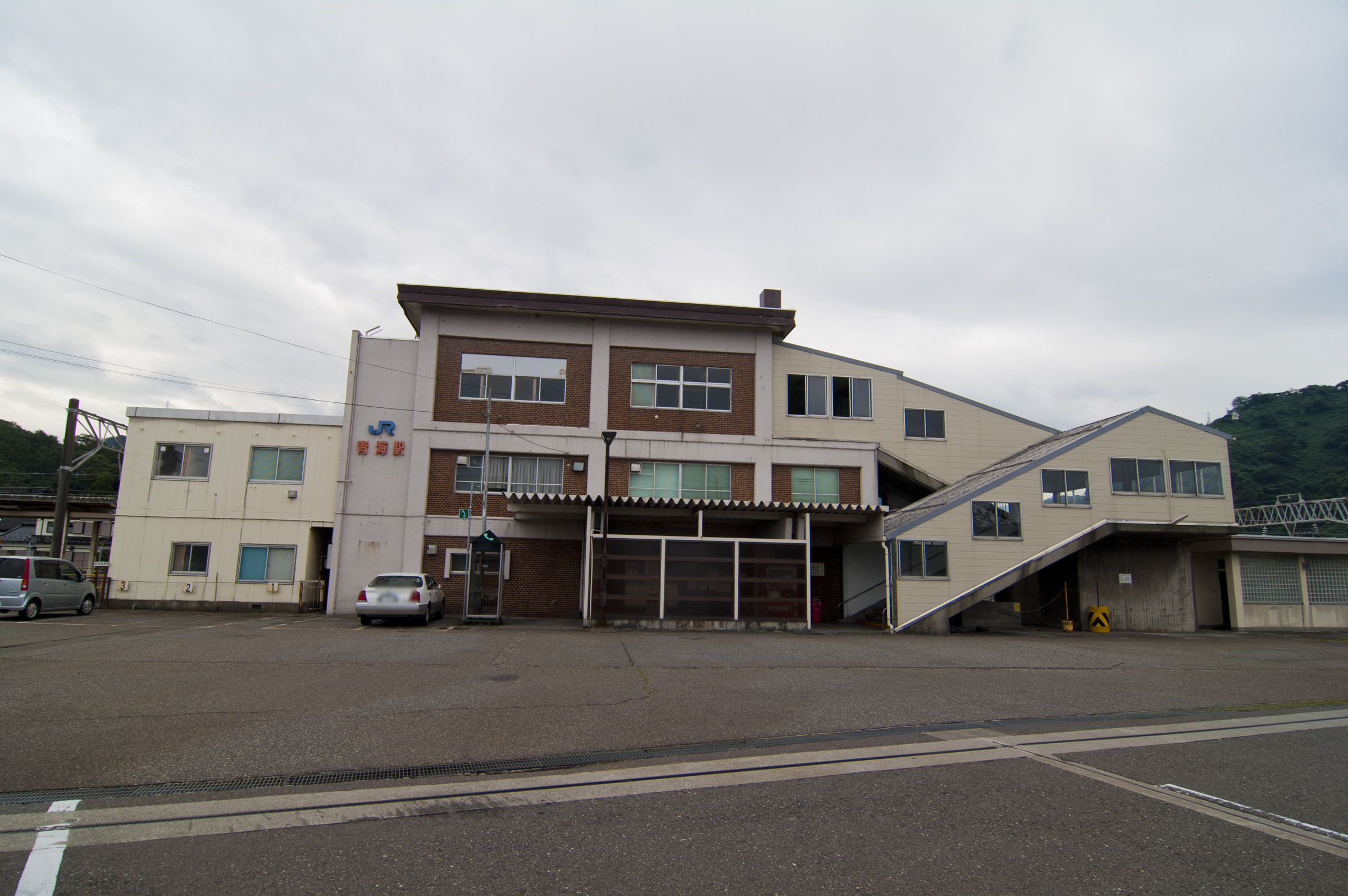
- Ōmi Station in September 2011

General information
- Location: 853 Ōmi, Itoigawa-shi, Niigata-ken 949-0305; Japan
- Coordinates: 37°01′22″N 137°47′40″E
- Operator: Echigo Tokimeki Railway
- Line: ■ Nihonkai Hisui Line
- Platforms: 2 island platforms
- Tracks: 2

Other information
- Status: Staffed

History
- Opened: 16 December 1912

Passengers
- FY2017: 150 daily
Location
- Location within Japan

Ōmi Station (青海駅, Ōmi-eki) is a railway station in the city of Itoigawa, Niigata, Japan, operated by Echigo Tokimeki Railway.

== Lines ==
Ōmi Station is served by the Nihonkai Hisui Line, and is 13.9 kilometers from the starting point of the line at Ichiburi and 308.4 kilometers from Maibara Station.

== Station layout ==
The station consists of two island platforms with a station building. However, only one of the platforms is in normal use.

=== Platforms ===
1	■ Nihonkai Hisui Line	for Naoetsu, Itoigawa
2	■ Nihonkai Hisui Line	for Tomari, Toyama
3・4	■ Nihonkai Hisui Line	(siding)

== Adjacent stations ==
«	Service	»
Nihonkai Hisui Line
Oyashirazu	Local	Itoigawa

== History ==
The station opened on 16 December 1912, as part of the Japanese Government Railways (JGR, JNR after 1949). From 14 March 2015, with the opening of the Hokuriku Shinkansen extension from Nagano to Kanazawa, local passenger operations over sections of the Shinetsu Main Line and Hokuriku Main Line running roughly parallel to the new shinkansen line were reassigned to third-sector railway operating companies. From this date, Ōmi Station was transferred to the ownership of the third-sector operating company Echigo Tokimeki Railway.

== Passenger statistics ==
In fiscal 2017, the station was used by an average of 150 passengers daily (boarding passengers only).

== Surrounding area ==
- Ōmi Post Office
- Ōmi Elementary School
- National Route 8

== See also ==
- List of railway stations in Japan
