= Echigo Tokimeki Railway =

Railway operating company in Japan

Echigo TOKImeki Railway Company
- Native name: えちごトキめき鉄道株式会社
- Romanized name: Echigo TOKImeki Tetsudō kabushiki-gaisha
- Type: Private KK
- Genre: Rail transport
- Founded: 22 November 2010
- Headquarters: Joetsu, Niigata, Japan
- Area served: Niigata Prefecture
- Key people: Tadahiro Shimazu (President)
- Services: Passenger railway
- Website: www.echigo-tokimeki.co.jp

The Echigo TOKImeki Railway Company (えちごトキめき鉄道株式会社, Echigo TOKImeki Tetsudō kabushiki-gaisha), officially abbreviated as ETR, is a Japanese third-sector railway operator. It was established in 2010 to operate passenger railway services on the sections of the JR East Shinetsu Main Line and JR West Hokuriku Main Line within Niigata Prefecture when they were separated from the respective JR Group operators in March 2015, coinciding with the opening of the Hokuriku Shinkansen extension from Nagano to Kanazawa. The main shareholders of the company are Niigata Prefecture, the City of Joetsu, the City of Itoigawa, and the City of Myoko.

== Lines ==
Since 14 March 2015, Echigo Tokimeki Railway operates local passenger operations on two lines: 10 stations on the 37.7 km Myōkō Haneuma Line (妙高はねうまライン) (formerly part of the JR East Shinetsu Main Line) between Myōkō-Kōgen and Naoetsu, and 13 stations on the 59.3 km Nihonkai Hisui Line (日本海ひすいライン) (formerly part of the JR West Hokuriku Main Line) between Naoetsu and Ichiburi.

== Myōkō Haneuma Line ==
Myōkō Haneuma Line
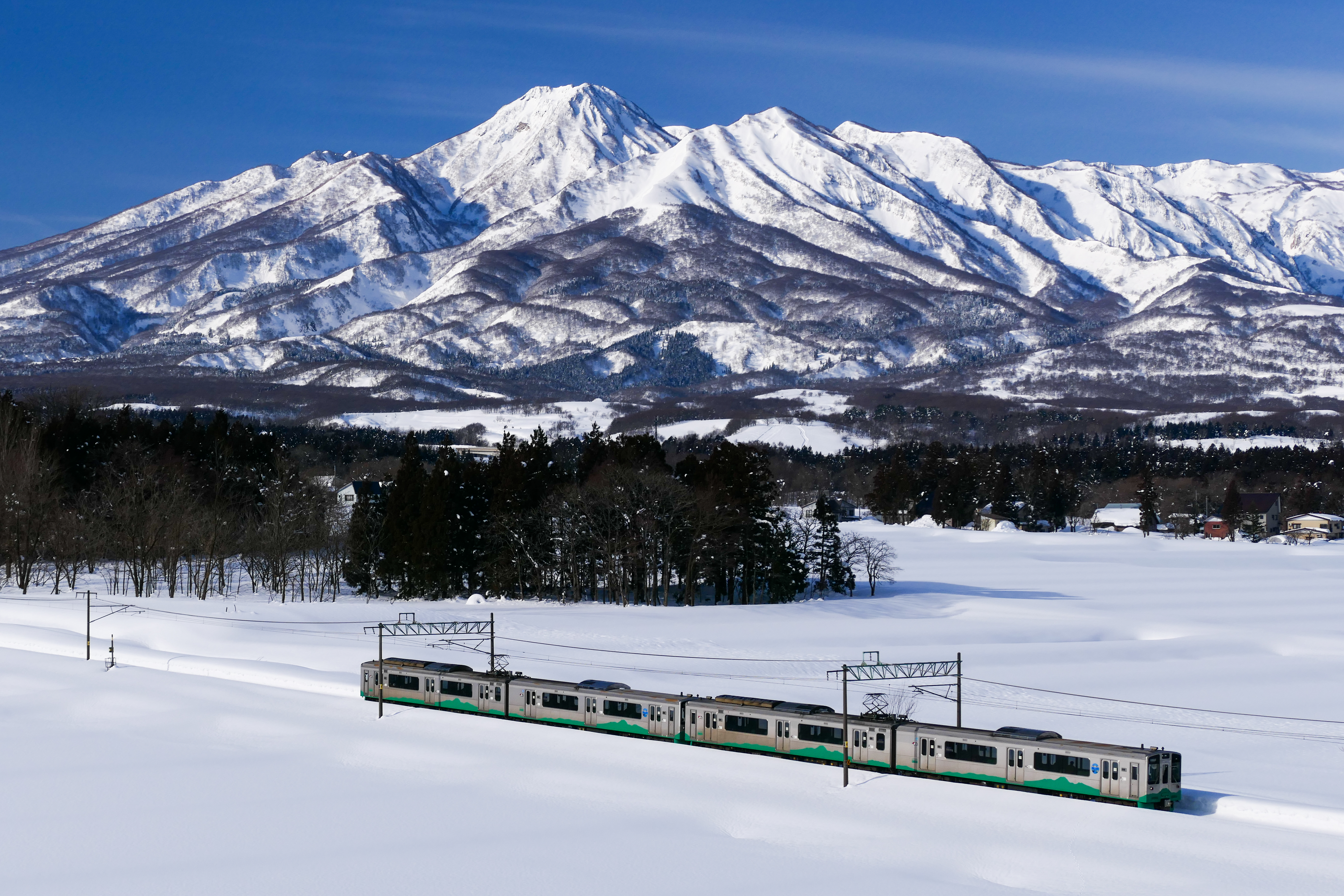
- An ET127 series EMU on the Myōkō Haneuma Line in February 2022

Overview
- Native name: 妙高はねうまライン
- Status: Operational
- Owner: Echigo Tokimeki Railway
- Locale: Niigata Prefecture
- Termini: Myōkō-Kōgen; Naoetsu
- Stations: 10

Service
- Type: Regional rail
- Rolling stock: ET127 series EMUs; E653-1100 series EMUs

History
- Opened: 15 August 1886; 140 years ago

Technical
- Line length: 37.7 km (23.4 mi)
- Number of tracks: Single track
- Track gauge: 1,067 mm (3 ft 6 in)
- Electrification: 1,500 V DC Overhead line
Route map

=== Service outline ===
In addition to all-stations "Local" (普通, futsū) services operated by ETR, the line is used by JR East Shirayuki limited express services operating over the section between Jōetsumyōkō and Naoetsu, providing connections with the Hokuriku Shinkansen at Naoetsu, and also by one return "Rapid" service daily operated by the Hokuetsu Express, to and from Echigo-Yuzawa and using the section of the line between Naoetsu and Arai. The Rapid service on only holidays which uses 455 series and 413 series has been commenced operated since 4 July 2021.

=== Stations ===
All stations are in Niigata Prefecture.

| Station | Japanese | Transfers | Location |
|---|---|---|---|
| Myōkō-Kōgen | 妙高高原 | Shinano Railway Kita-Shinano Line | Myōkō |
| Sekiyama | 関山 | | Myōkō |
| Nihongi | 二本木 | | Jōetsu |
| Arai | 新井 | | Myōkō |
| Kita-Arai | 北新井 | | Myōkō |
| Jōetsumyōkō | 上越妙高 | Hokuriku Shinkansen | Jōetsu |
| Minami-Takada | 南高田 | | Jōetsu |
| Takada | 高田 | | Jōetsu |
| Kasugayama | 春日山 | | Jōetsu |
| Naoetsu | 直江津 | ETR Nihonkai Hisui Line; ■ Shinetsu Main Line | Jōetsu |

=== Rolling stock ===
Local services on the Myōkō Haneuma Line use a fleet of ten ET127 series 2-car electric multiple unit (EMU) trains transferred from JR East. These have reinforced front-end skirts, and feature a new livery. They operate as two- or four-car formation during the off-peak periods, and as six-car formations during peak periods. Shirayuki limited express services operated by JR East use four-car E653-1100 series EMUs.

Since 4 July 2021, Rapid service which uses 413 series and 455 series has been commenced operating on Myoko Haneuma Line on only holidays.

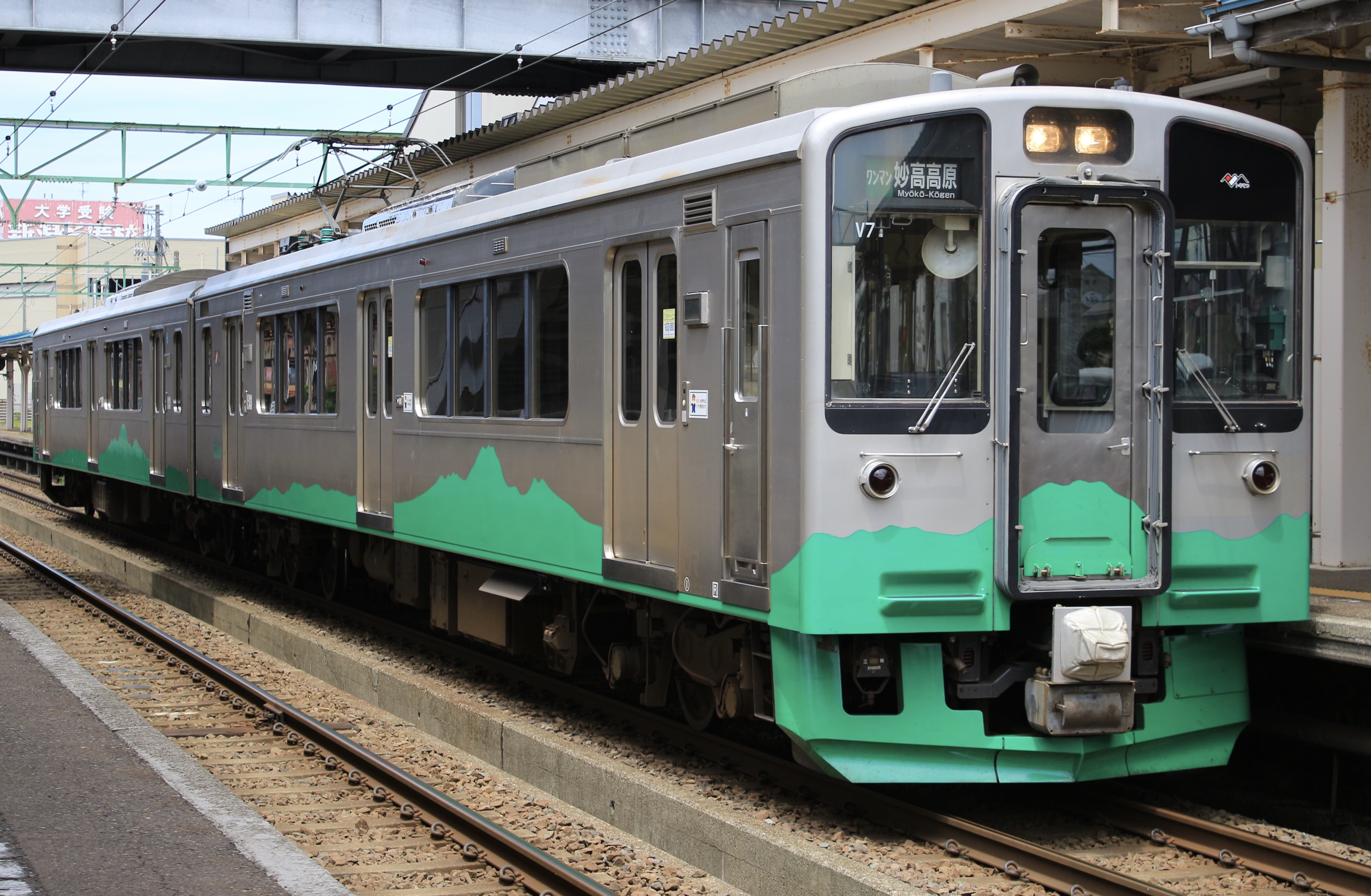
An ET127 series EMU, June 2021

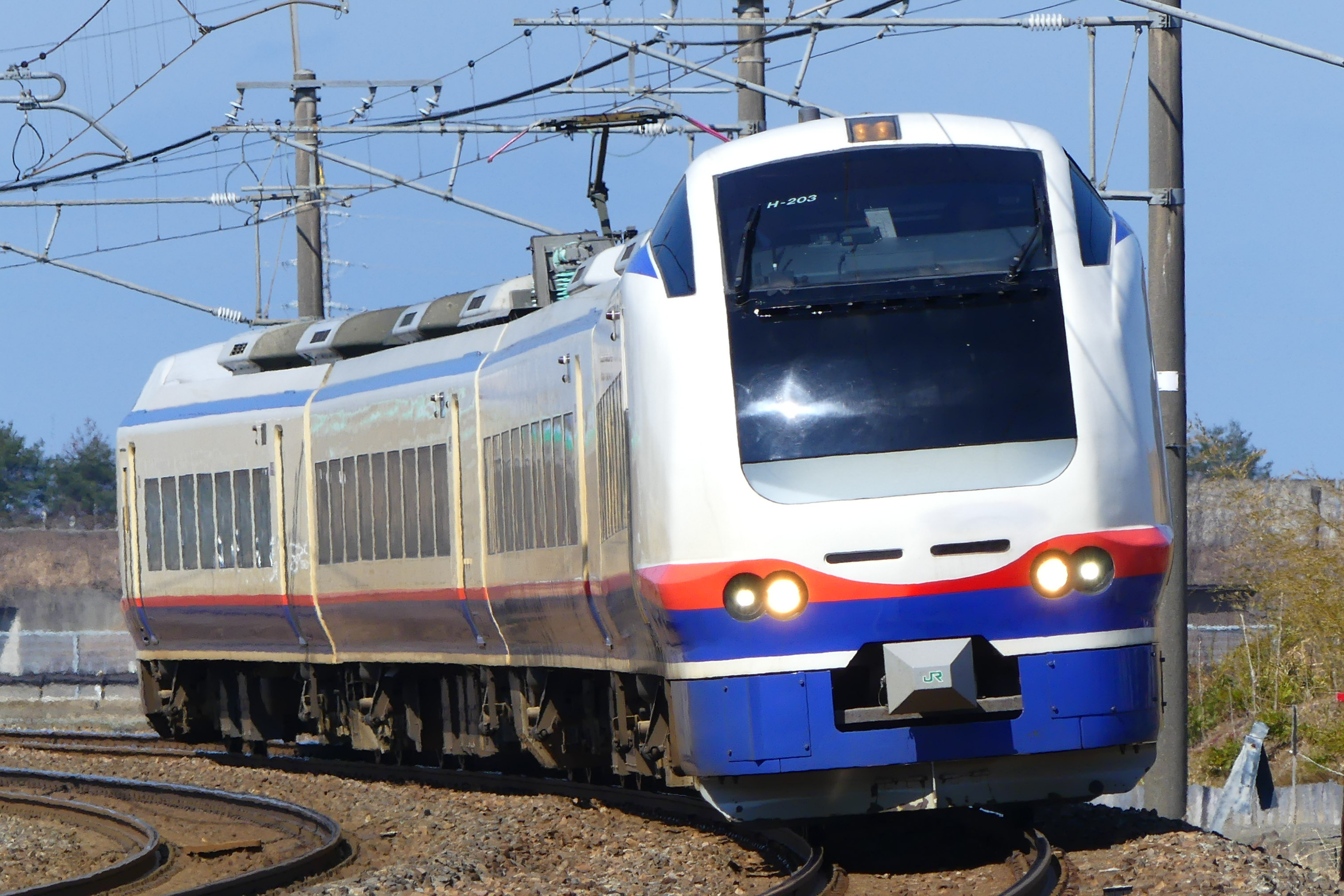
A Shirayuki E653-1100 series EMU

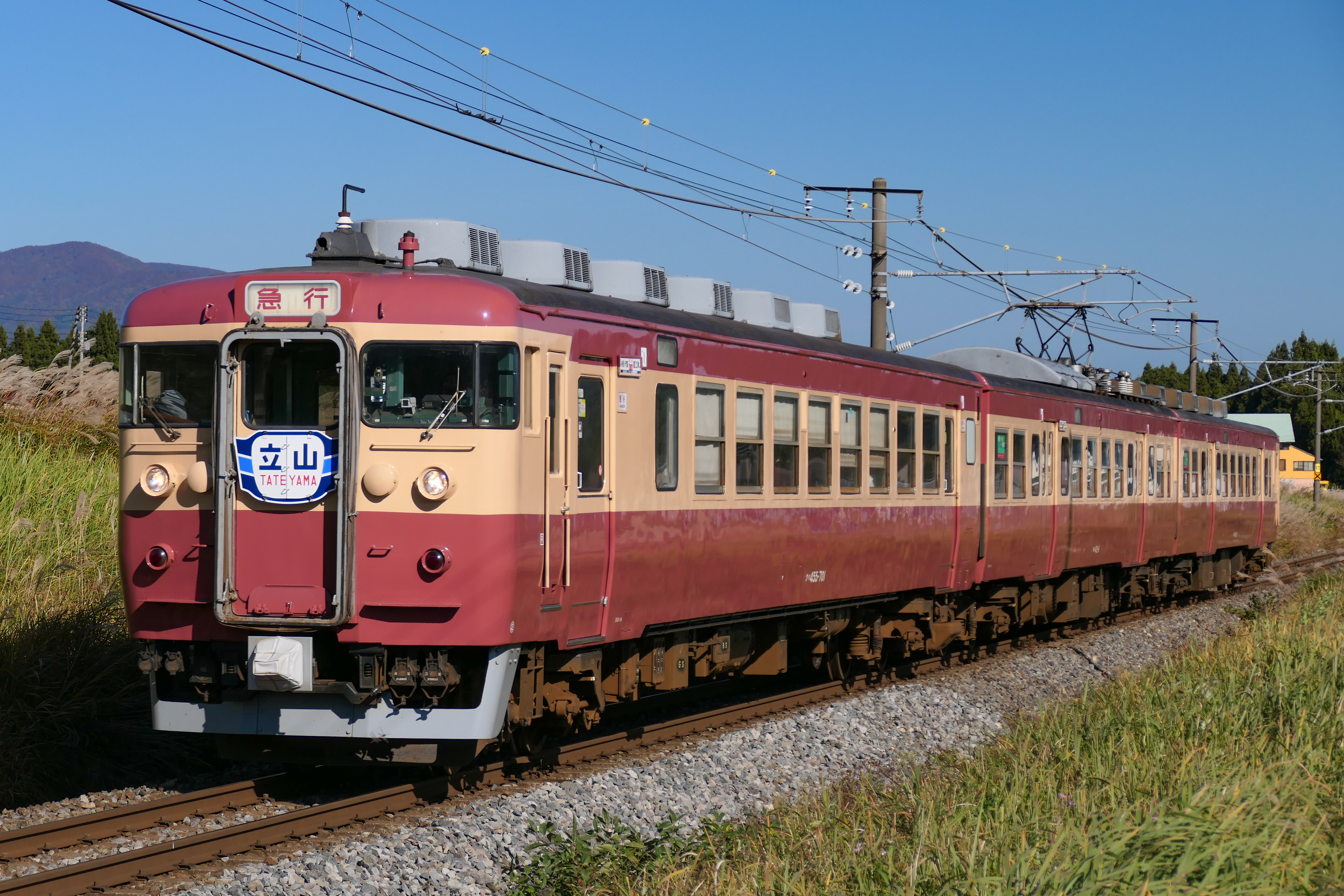
455 series and 413 series EMU which had been used by JR West on Nanao Line since 2020

== Nihonkai Hisui Line ==
Nihonkai Hisui Line
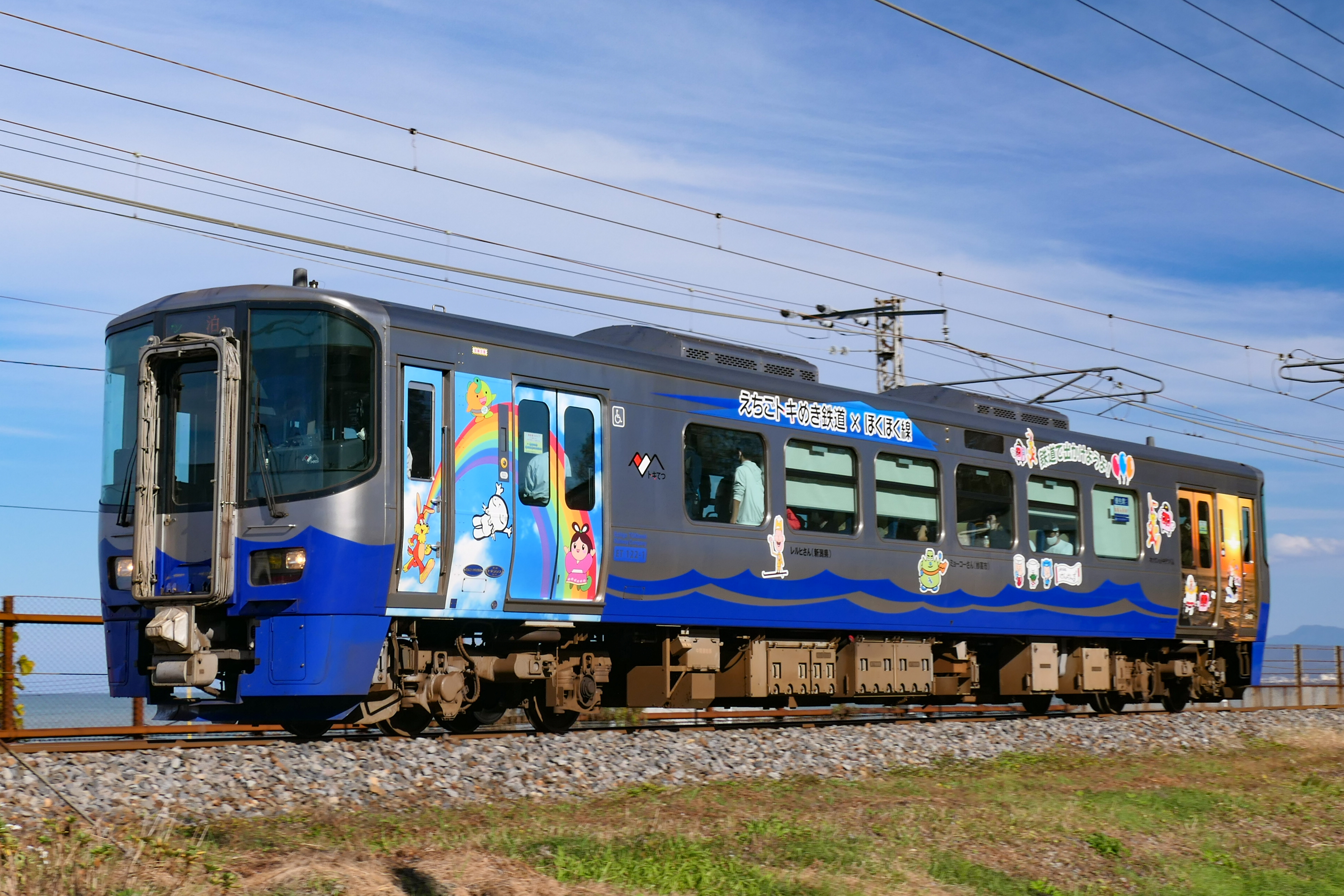
- An ET122 diesel car on the Nihonkai Hisui Line in October 2021

Overview
- Native name: 日本海ひすいライン
- Status: Operational
- Owner: Echigo Tokimeki Railway
- Locale: Niigata Prefecture
- Termini: Naoetsu; Ichiburi
- Stations: 13

Service
- Type: Regional rail
- Rolling stock: ET122 DMUs; 485 series (JR), 521 series

History
- Opened: 1911; 115 years ago

Technical
- Line length: 59.3 km (36.8 mi)
- Number of tracks: Double track
- Track gauge: 1,067 mm (3 ft 6 in)
- Electrification: 1,500 V DC / 20 kV AC (60 Hz) Overhead line
Route map

=== Service outline ===
==== Local services ====
At the western boundary of the Nihonkai Hisui Line at Ichiburi, all local services continue two stations onto the Ainokaze Toyama Railway Line to terminate at Tomari. At Tomari, both ETR trains and Ainokaze Toyama Railway trains use platform 2, allowing a same-platform transfer. Trains operate approximately every 60-90 minutes during off-peak hours, with additional services during peak hours.

The only exception is one daily round trip between Itoigawa (departing at 06:43) and Kanazawa (departing at 17:40) which is operated by a 521 series EMU train owned by Ainokaze Toyama Railway.

==== Sightseeing Express services ====
From 4 July 2021, Sightseeing Express services commenced operation using former JNR 455 series and 413 series trains. Operating only on weekends and holidays, there are two round trips per day between Naoetsu and Ichiburi. Purchase of an additional 500 yen (250 yen for children) Express fare is required.

=== Stations ===
All stations are in Niigata Prefecture.

| Station | Japanese | Transfers | Location |
|---|---|---|---|
↑Through service to/from Tomari on the Ainokaze Toyama Railway Line↑
| Ichiburi | 市振 | Ainokaze Toyama Railway Line | Itoigawa |
| Oyashirazu | 親不知 | | Itoigawa |
| Ōmi | 青海 | | Itoigawa |
| Itoigawa | 糸魚川 | Hokuriku Shinkansen; ■ Ōito Line | Itoigawa |
| Echigo Oshiage Hisui Kaigan | えちご押上ひすい海岸 | | Itoigawa |
| Kajiyashiki | 梶屋敷 | | Itoigawa |
| Uramoto | 浦本 | | Itoigawa |
| Nō | 能生 | | Itoigawa |
| Tsutsuishi | 筒石 | | Itoigawa |
| Nadachi | 名立 | | Jōetsu |
| Arimagawa | 有間川 | | Jōetsu |
| Tanihama | 谷浜 | | Jōetsu |
| Naoetsu | 直江津 | ■ Hokuetsu Express Hokuhoku Line; ETR Myoko Haneuma Line; ■ Shinetsu Main Line | Jōetsu |

=== Rolling stock ===
The eastern section of the line is electrified at 1,500 V DC and the western section of the line is electrified at 20 kV AC (60 Hz) overhead, with a dead section separating the two different power supplies between Itoigawa and Kajiyashiki stations, but in order to eliminate the need to procure new dual-voltage rolling stock, local services on the Nihonkai Hisui Line use a fleet of eight new ET122 single-car diesel multiple unit (DMU) trains based on the JR West KiHa 122 series design. This fleet includes two special-event cars. Services normally operate as single-car trains during the off-peak periods, increased to two cars during the peaks.

One daily round trip between Itoigawa (departing at 06:43) and Kanazawa (departing at 17:40) is operated by a 521 series EMU train owned by Ainokaze Toyama Railway.

Until March 2017, a seasonal, limited-stop Rapid service, operating between Niigata and Itoigawa, ran once a day in each direction using a 6-car JR East 485 series EMU.

Since 4 July 2021, an Express service has been run, operating only on holidays. It uses 413 series and 455 series cars.

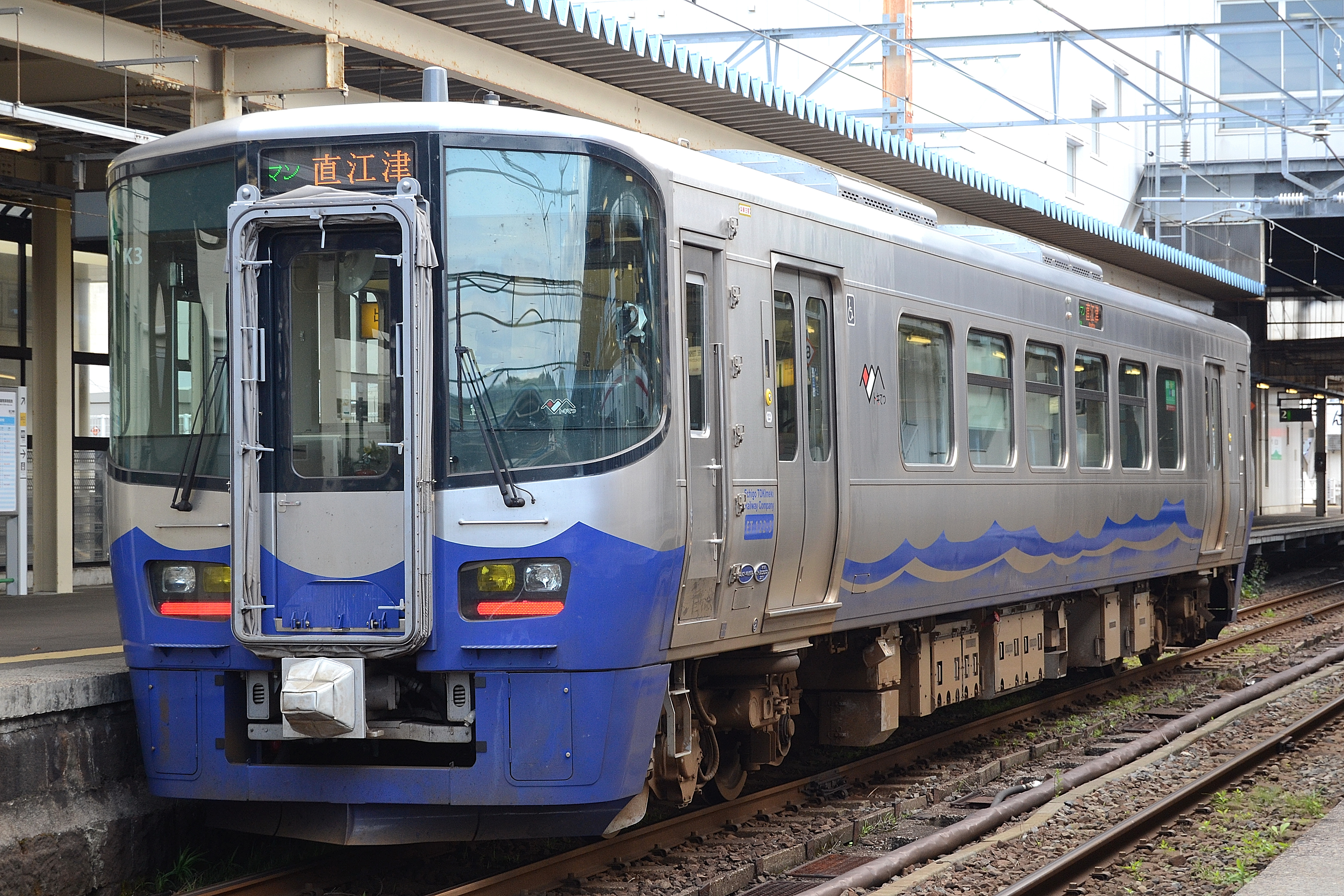
An ET122 DMU car, June 2015

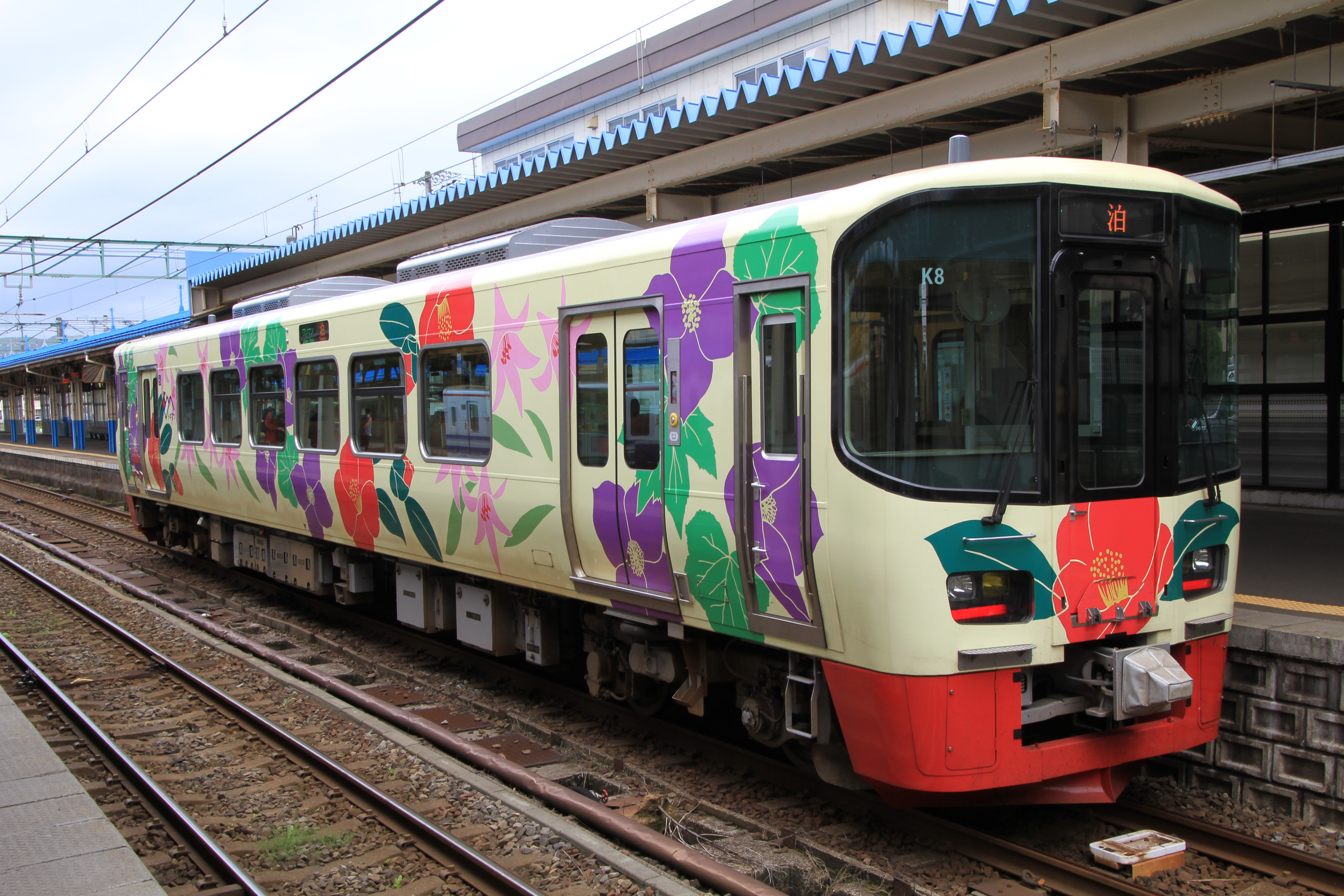
An ET122 DMU special-event car, May 2015

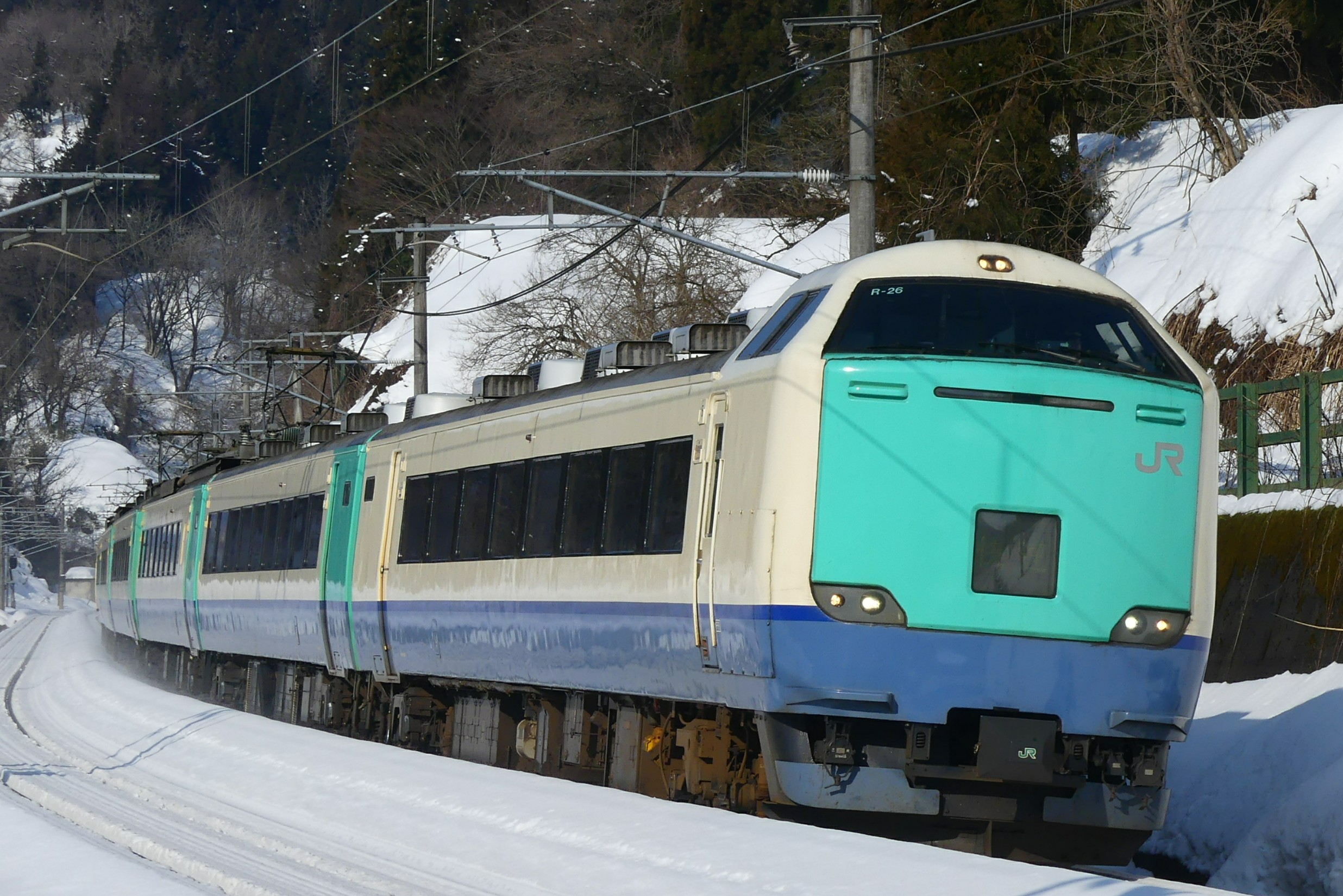
A JR East 485 series EMU

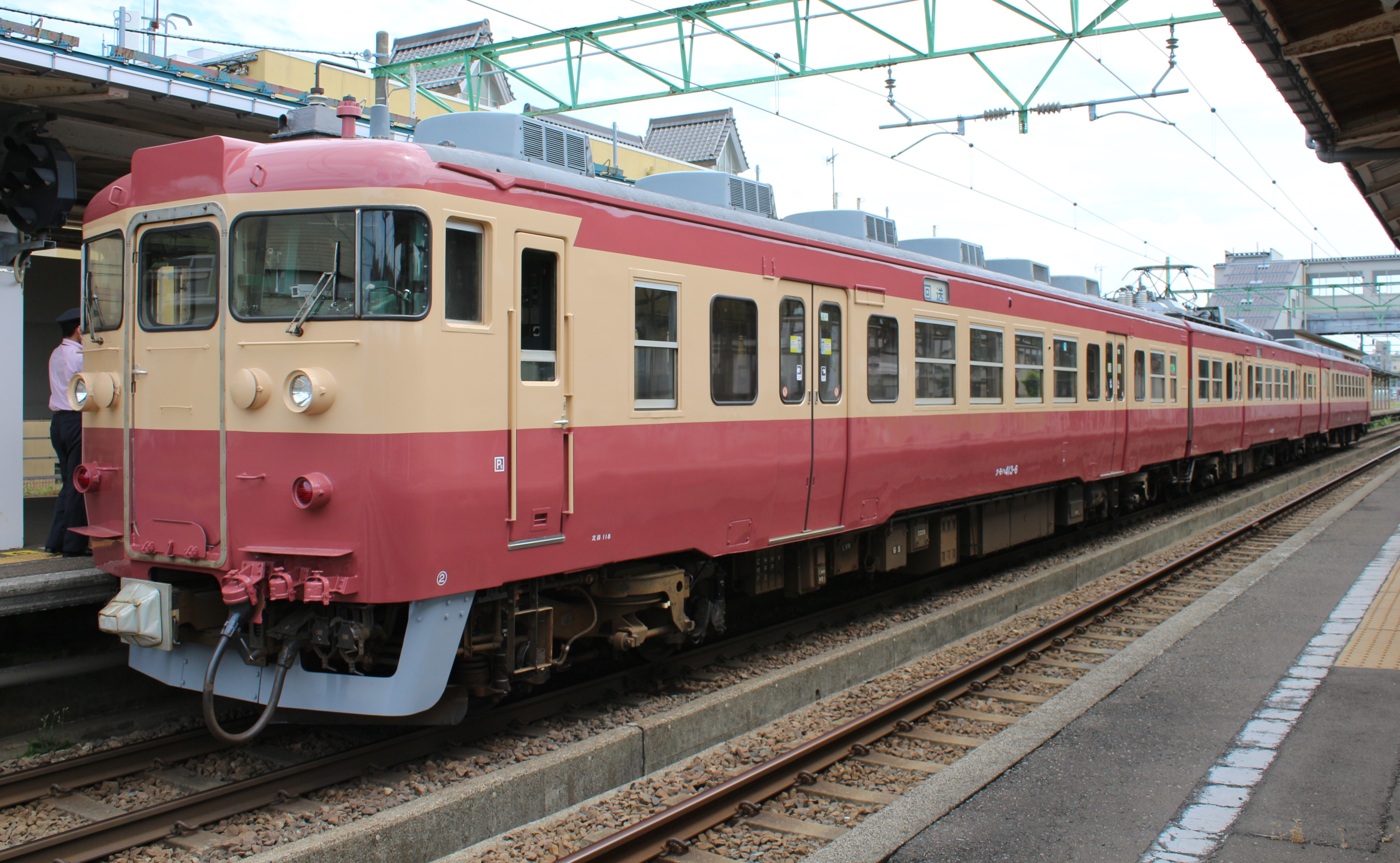
413 series and 455 series EMU which had been used by JR West on Nanao Line since 2020

== History ==
The company was founded on 22 November 2010. The new names for the two lines to be operated by the company were announced in June 2012, and the company name was changed to Echigo Tokimeki Railway Company from 1 July 2012. The company was formally granted a railway operating license by the Ministry of Land, Infrastructure, Transport and Tourism on 28 February 2014.

== Resort train ==
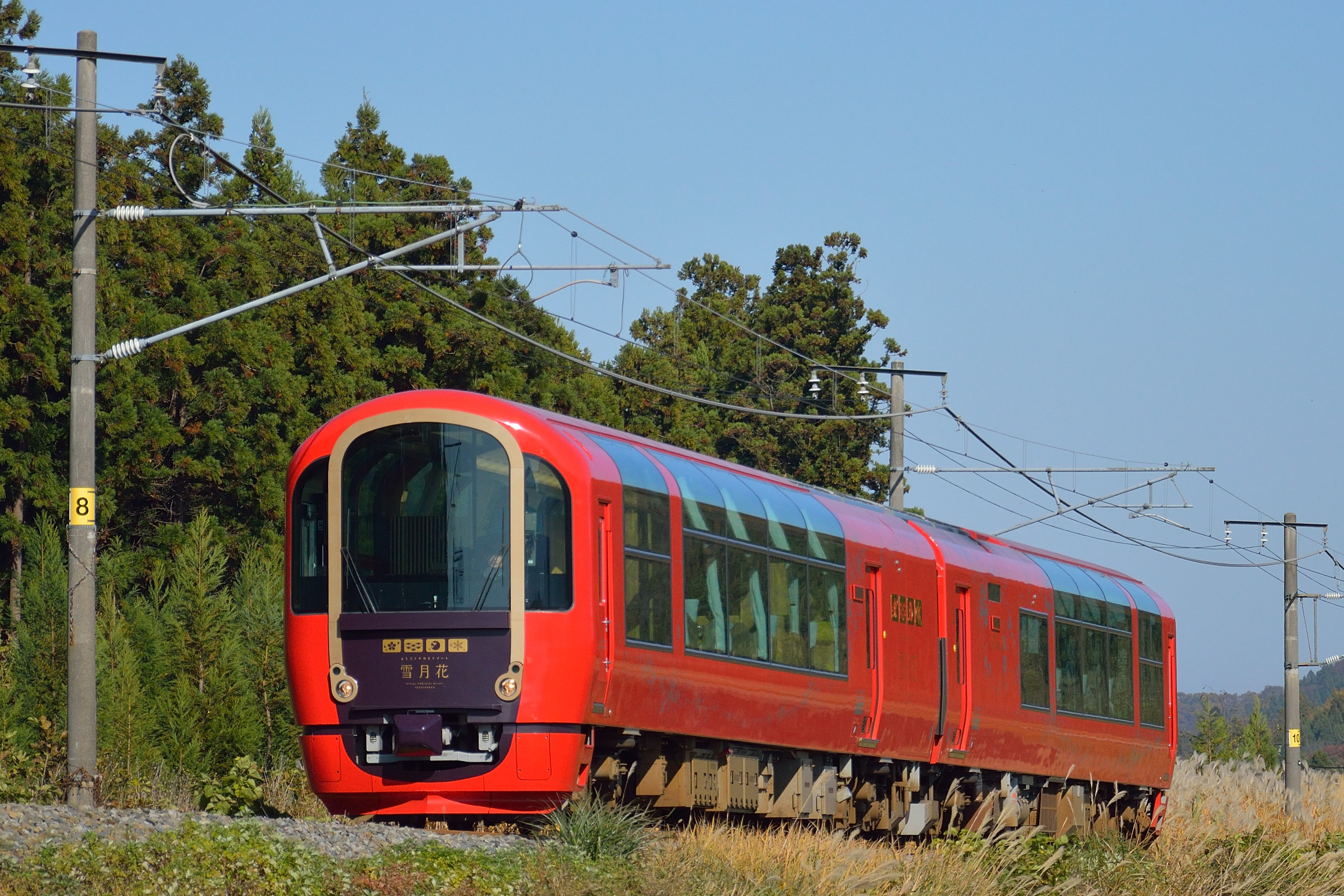
Setsugekka train

A two-car ET122-1000 series diesel multiple unit resort train entered service from 23 April 2016, operating over both of the ETR lines. The two-car diesel train is branded Setsugekka (雪月花; lit. "Snow, Moon, Flowers").

== See also ==
- List of railway companies in Japan
- List of railway lines in Japan
- Ainokaze Toyama Railway, a third-sector railway company in neighbouring Toyama Prefecture
- Shinano Railway, a third-sector railway company in neighbouring Nagano Prefecture
