= Ichiburi Station =

Railway station in Itoigawa, Niigata Prefecture, Japan

Ichiburi Station 市振駅
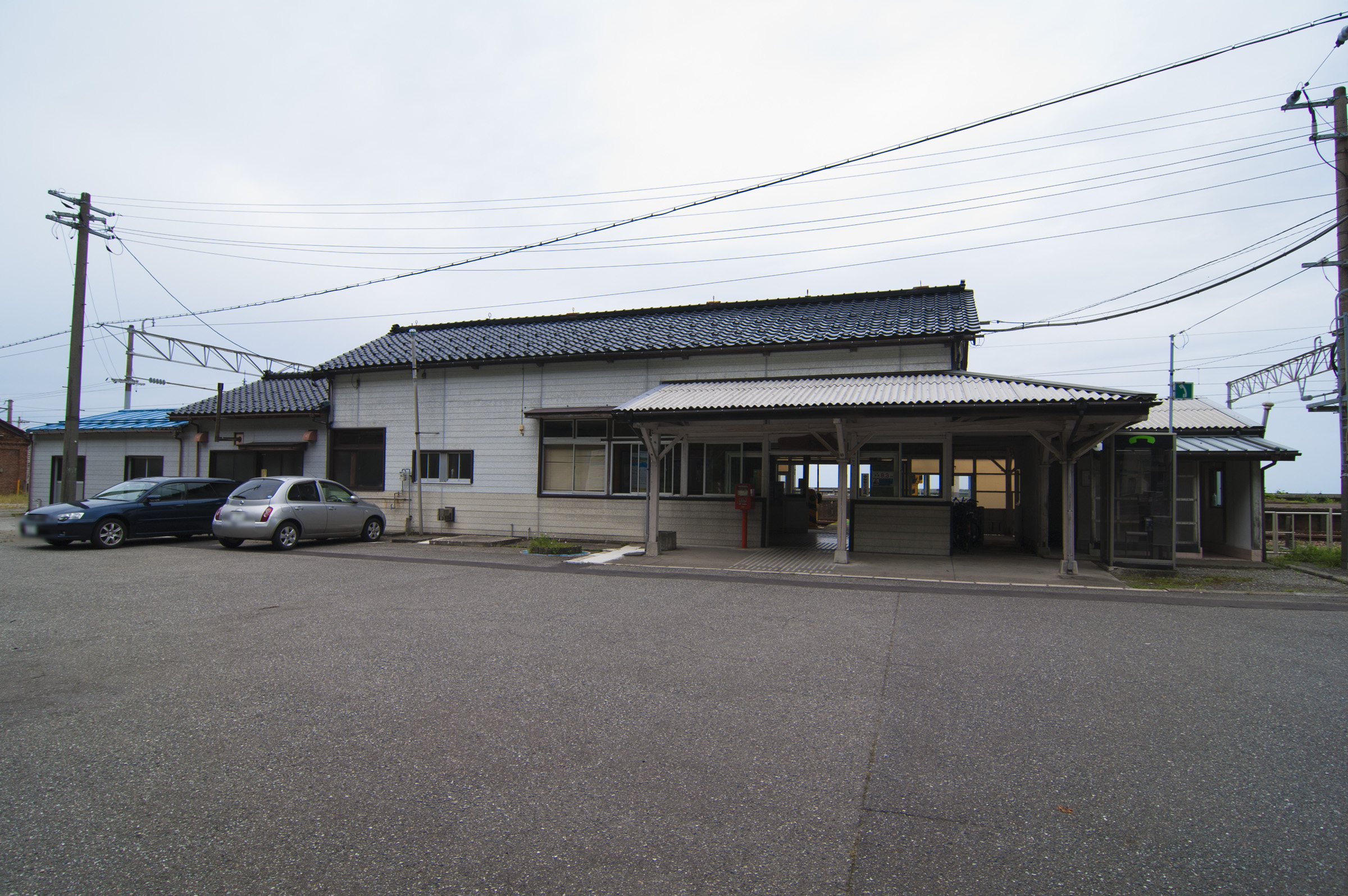
- Ichiburi Station, September 2011

General information
- Location: 913 Ichiburi, Itoigawa-shi, Niigata-ken 949-0111; Japan
- Coordinates: 36.9804°N 137.6506°E
- Operator: Ainokaze Toyama Railway; Echigo TOKImeki
- Lines: Ainokaze Toyama Railway Line; ■ Echigo Tokimeki Railway Nihonkai Hisui Line
- Platforms: 1 island platform

History
- Opened: 15 October 1912

Passengers
- FY2017: 57 daily

Services
Preceding station	Ainokaze Toyama Railway	Following station
Etchū-Miyazaki towards Kurikara	Ainokaze Toyama Railway Line	through to Nihonkai Hisui Line
Preceding station	Echigo TOKImeki	Following station
through to Ainokaze Toyama Railway Line	Nihonkai Hisui Line	Oyashirazu towards Naoetsu
Location
- Location within Japan

Ichiburi Station (市振駅, Ichiburi-eki) is a railway station in Itoigawa, Niigata, Japan, operated by the third-sector railway operating companies Ainokaze Toyama Railway and Echigo Tokimeki Railway (ETR).

== Lines ==
Ichiburi Station forms the boundary station for the Ainokaze Toyama Railway Line to the west and Echigo Tokimeki Railway Nihonkai Hisui Line to the east. Although it is the nominal terminal station for the Echigo Tokimeki Railway, many services continue west to terminate at Tomari. It is 100.1 kilometers from the starting point of the Ainokaze Toyama Railway Line at Kurikara Station and is 294.5 kilometers from Maibara Station.

== Station layout ==
The station consists of one island platform connected to the station building by a level crossing. The station is unattended.

=== Platforms ===
station side	■ Ainokaze Toyama Railway Line	for Tomari and Toyama
opposite side	■ Nihonkai Hisui Line	for Itoigawa and Naoetsu

== History ==
Ichiburi Station opened on 15 October 1912. With the privatization of Japanese National Railways (JNR) on 1 April 1987, the station came under the control of JR West.

From 14 March 2015, with the opening of the Hokuriku Shinkansen extension from Nagano to Kanazawa, local passenger operations over sections of the former Hokuriku Main Line running roughly parallel to the new shinkansen line were reassigned to different third-sector railway operating companies. From this date, Ichiburi Station became a boundary station between the Ainokaze Toyama Railway Line of Toyama Prefecture to the west and the Echigo Tokimeki Railway Nihonkai Hisui Line of Niigata Prefecture to the east.

== Passenger statistics ==
In fiscal 2015, the station was used by an average of 56 passengers daily (boarding passengers only).

== Surrounding area ==
- Ichiburi Swimming Beach
- National Route 8
- Site of Ichiburi Barrier

== See also ==
- List of railway stations in Japan
