= Itoigawa Station =

Railway station in Itoigawa, Niigata Prefecture, Japan

Itoigawa Station 糸魚川駅
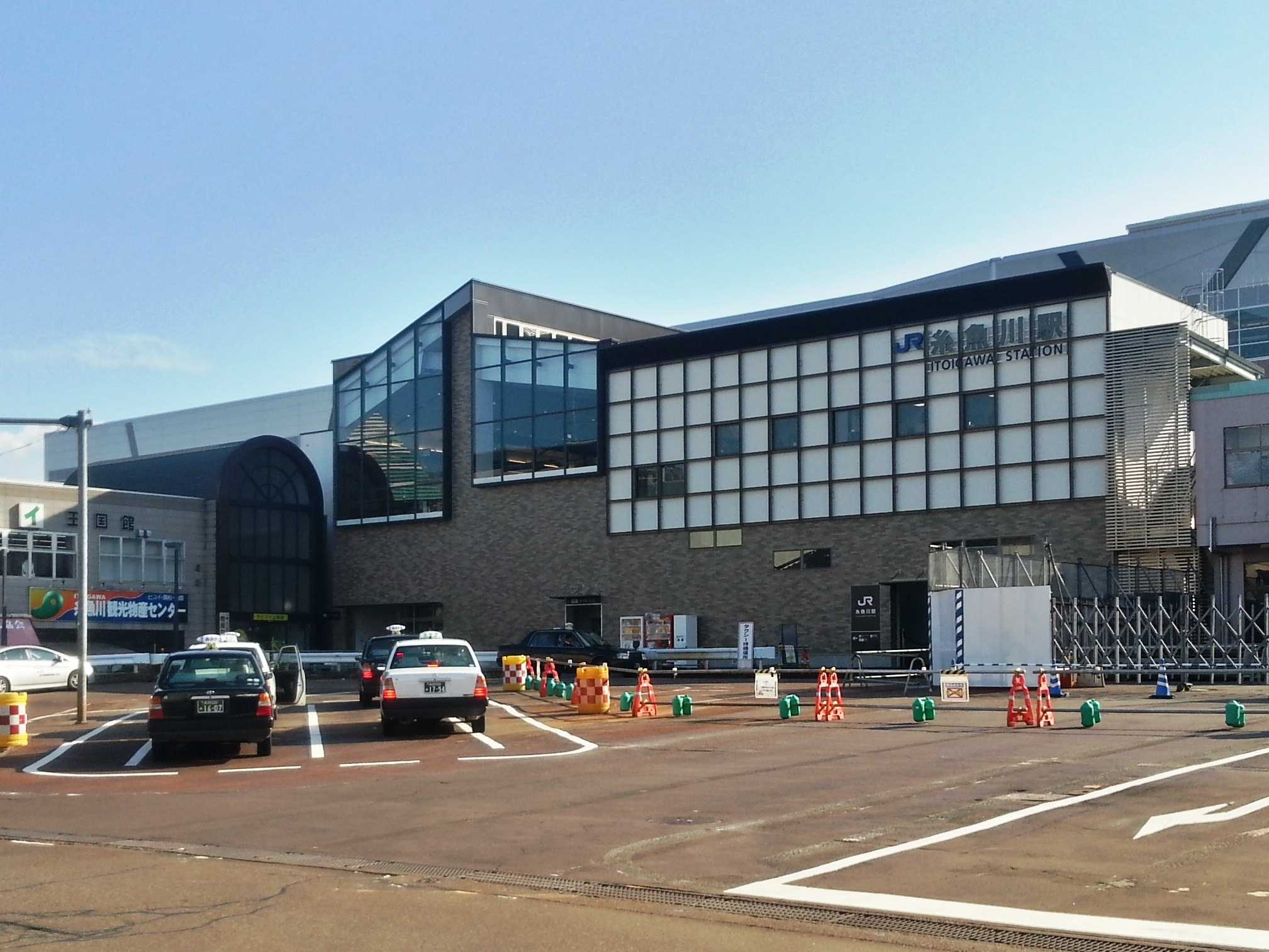
- Itoigawa Station in December 2013

Japanese name
- Shinjitai: 糸魚川駅
- Kyūjitai: 絲魚川驛
- Hiragana: いといがわえき

General information
- Location: 1-7-10 Ōmachi, Itoigawa City, Niigata Prefecture 941-0061; Japan
- Coordinates: 37°2′38″N 137°51′45″E
- Operator: JR West; Echigo Tokimeki Railway; JR Freight
- Lines: Hokuriku Shinkansen; Ōito Line; ■ Nihonkai Hisui Line
- Platforms: 1 island + 1 side platforms (Oito Line, Hisui Line); 2 side platforms (Shinkansen)

Other information
- Status: Staffed (Midori no Madoguchi)

History
- Opened: 16 December 1912; 113 years ago

Passengers
- FY2016: 1,205 daily

Services
Preceding station	JR West	Following station
Kurobe-Unazukionsen towards Tsuruga	Hokuriku Shinkansen Hakutaka	Jōetsumyōkō Terminus
Terminus	Ōito Line	Himekawa towards Minami-Otari
Preceding station	Echigo TOKImeki	Following station
Ōmi towards Ichiburi	Nihonkai Hisui Line	Echigo Oshiage Hisui Kaigan towards Naoetsu
Location
- Location within Nihonkai Hisui Line Location within Niigata Prefecture Location within Chubu region Location within Japan

Itoigawa Station (糸魚川駅, Itoigawa-eki) is a railway station in Itoigawa, Niigata, Japan, operated by West Japan Railway Company (JR West) and the third-sector railway operator Echigo Tokimeki Railway. It is also a freight terminal for the Japan Freight Railway Company.

== Lines ==
Itoigawa Station is served by the JR West high-speed Hokuriku Shinkansen and the local Ōito Line, and is located 213.9 kilometers from Takasaki Station and 318.9 kilometers from Tokyo Station. It is 105.4 kilometers from Matsumoto Station, the terminus of the Ōito Line. For the Echigo Tokimeki Railway Nihonkai Hisui Line, the station is 29.9 kilometers from Tomari Station and 315.0 kilometers from Maibara Station.

== Station layout ==
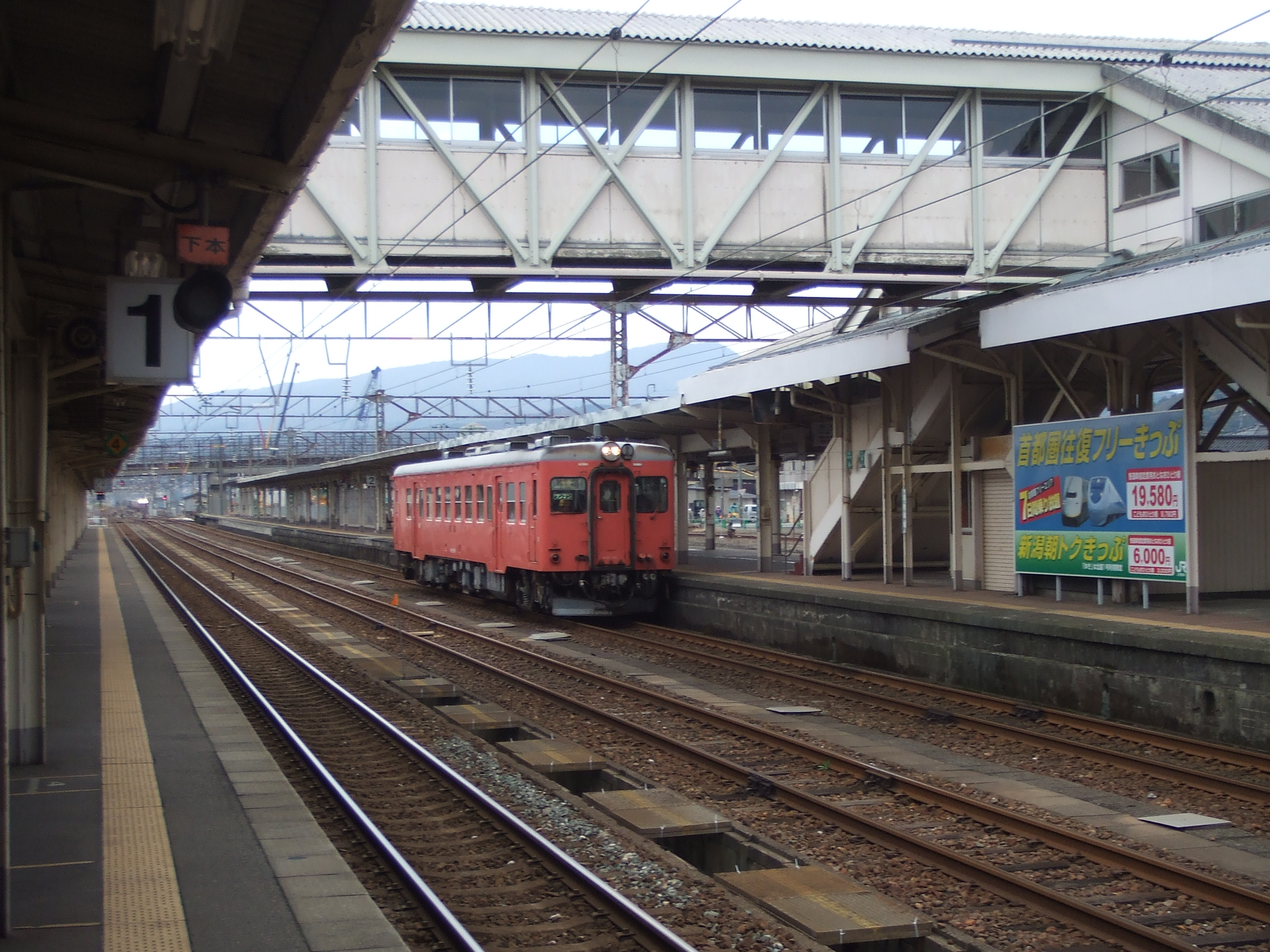
Oito Line train and platforms in November 2008

The local portion of the station has one side platform and one island platform with a cut-out, serving four tracks in total. The Shinkansen portion of the station has two opposed side platforms, located above the local train platforms. The station building is located below the tracks and platforms. The station has a Midori no Madoguchi staffed ticket office.

=== Platforms ===
1	■ Nihonkai Hisui Line	for Naoetsu
2	■ Nihonkai Hisui Line	for Naoetsu for Ichiburi
3	■ Nihonkai Hisui Line	for Ichiburi
4	■ Ōito Line	for Minami-Otari
11	■ Hokuriku Shinkansen	for Nagano and Tokyo
12	■ Hokuriku Shinkansen	for Toyama, Kanazawa and Tsuruga

The departure melody used for the Shinkansen platforms is the traditional children's song "Haru yo Koi" (春よ来い), the lyrics for which were written by Gyofū Sōma, a native of Itoigawa.

== History ==
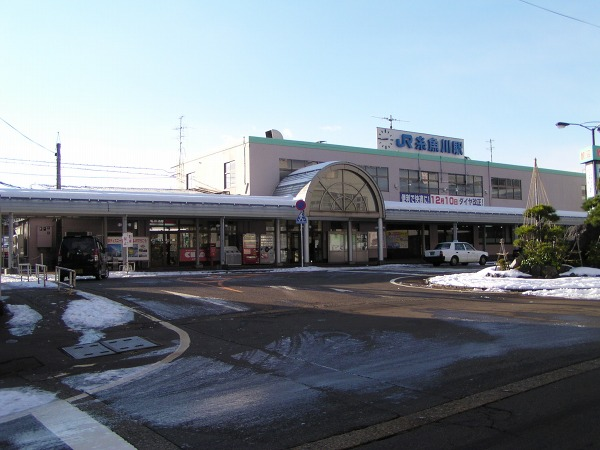
The former station building in December 2005

The station opened on 16 December 1912. With the privatization of JNR on 1 April 1987, the station came under the control of JR West.

The platforms for the Hokuriku Shinkansen opened for service on 14 March 2015.

From 14 March 2015, with the opening of the Hokuriku Shinkansen extension from Nagano to Kanazawa, local passenger operations over sections of the Shinetsu Main Line and Hokuriku Main Line running roughly parallel to the new shinkansen line were reassigned to third-sector railway operating companies. From this date, operations of former Hokuriku Main Line services were transferred to the ownership of the third-sector operating company Echigo Tokimeki Railway.

== Passenger statistics ==
In fiscal 2016, the station was used by an average of 1205 passengers daily (boarding passengers only).

== Surrounding area ==
- Itoigawa City Hall
- National Route 8

== See also ==
- List of railway stations in Japan
