= Ikuji Station =

Railway station in Kurobe, Toyama Prefecture, Japan

Ikuji Station 生地駅
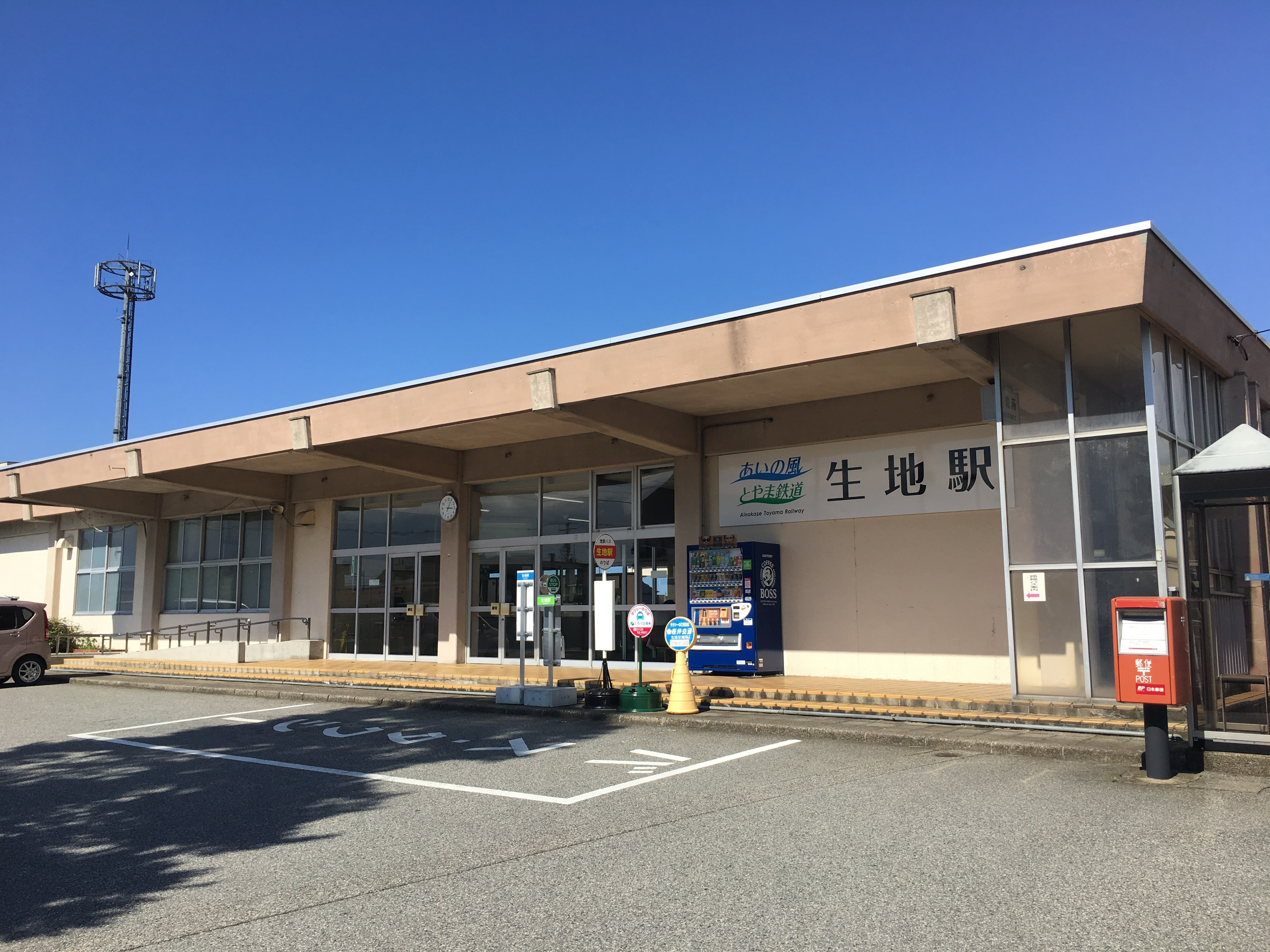
- Ikuji Station exterior in May 2017

General information
- Location: 4303 Yoshida-Urashima, Kurobe-shi, Toyama-ken 938-0005; Japan
- Coordinates: 36.9058°N 137.4265°E
- Operator: Ainokaze Toyama Railway
- Line: ■ Ainokaze Toyama Railway Line
- Distance: 77.4 km from Kurikara
- Platforms: 2 side platforms
- Tracks: 2

Other information
- Status: Staffed
- Website: Official website

History
- Opened: 16 April 1910

Passengers
- FY2015: 471 daily
Location
- Location within Japan

Ikuji Station (生地駅, Ikuji-eki) is a railway station on the Ainokaze Toyama Railway Line in the city of Kurobe, Toyama, Japan, operated by the third-sector railway operator Ainokaze Toyama Railway.

== Lines ==
Ikuji Station is served by the Ainokaze Toyama Railway Line and is 77.4 kilometres from the starting point of the line at Kurikara.

== Station layout ==
Ikuji Station has two opposed ground-level side platforms connected by a footbridge. The station is staffed.

=== Platforms ===
1	■ Ainokaze Toyama Railway Line	for Tomari and Itoigawa
2	■ Ainokaze Toyama Railway Line	for Toyama and Kanazawa

== History ==
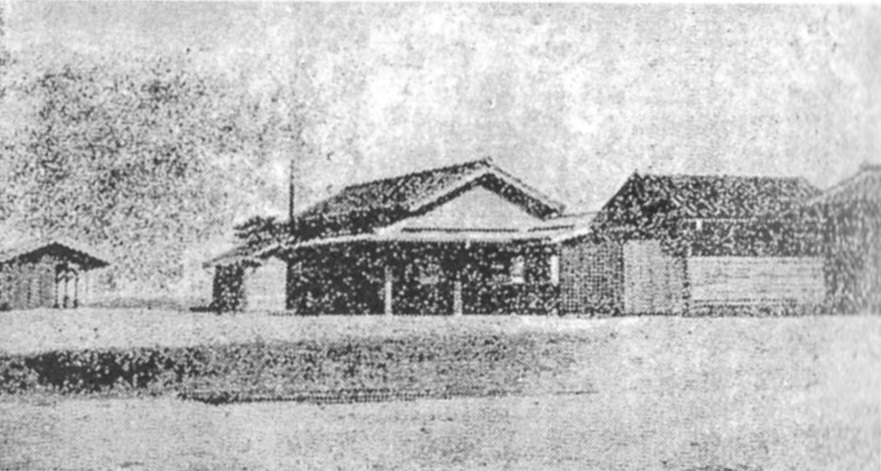
Ikuji Station in 1910

Ikuji Station was opened on 16 April 1910. From 14 March 2015, with the opening of the Hokuriku Shinkansen extension from Nagano to Kanazawa, local passenger operations over sections of the former Hokuriku Main Line running roughly parallel to the new shinkansen line were reassigned to different third-sector railway operating companies. From this date, Ikuji Station was transferred to the ownership of the third-sector operating company Ainokaze Toyama Railway.

== Adjacent stations ==
«	Service	»
Ainokaze Toyama Railway Line
Kurobe	Local	Nishi-Nyūzen

== Passenger statistics ==
In fiscal 2015, the station was used by an average of 471 passengers daily (boarding passengers only).

== Surrounding area ==
- YKK Kurobe factory

== See also ==
- List of railway stations in Japan
