= Kureha Station =

Railway station in Toyama, Toyama Prefecture, Japan

Kureha Station 呉羽駅
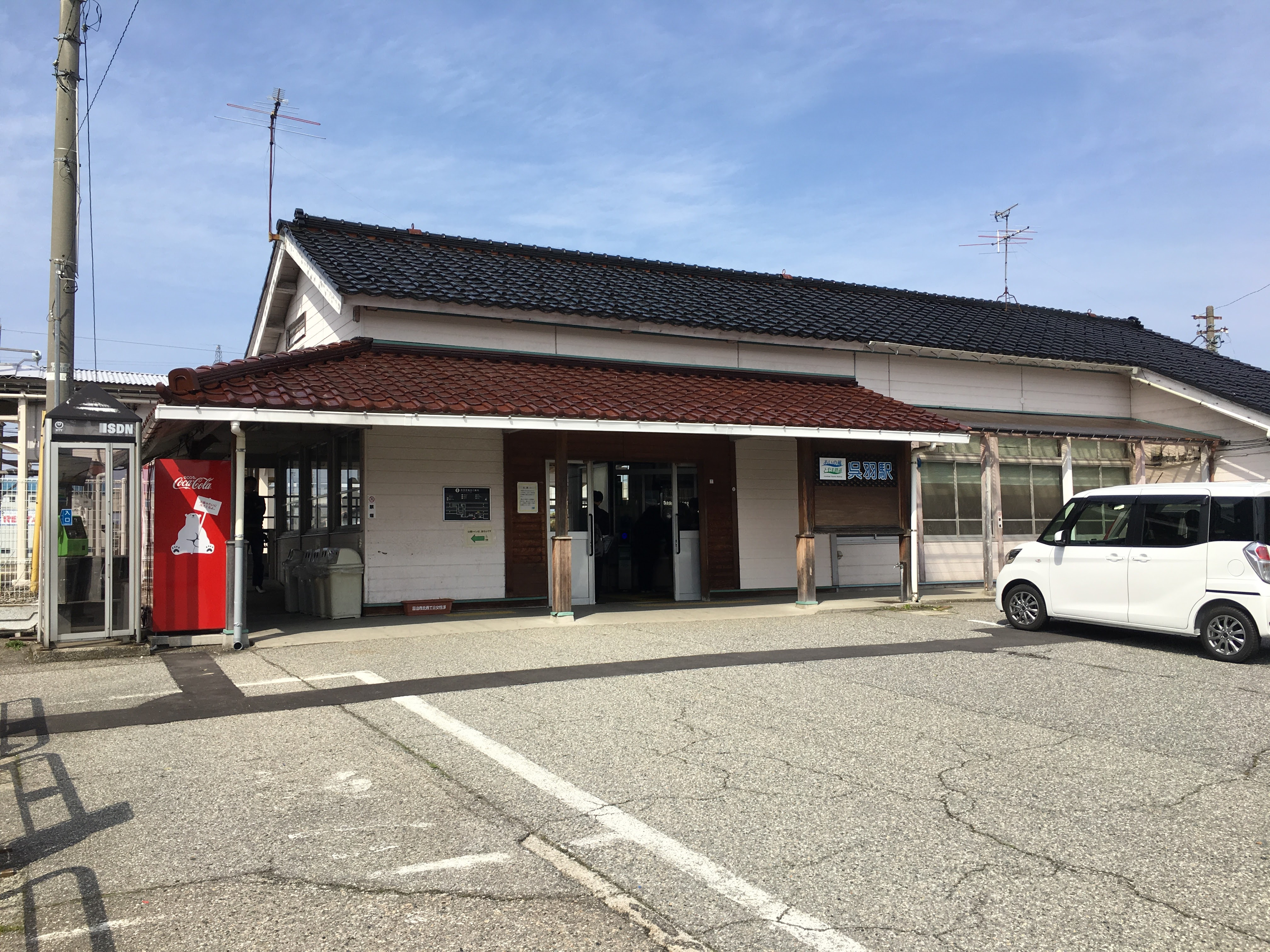
- Kureha Station in March 2017

General information
- Location: 1669 Kureha-cho, Toyama-shi, Toyama-ken 930-0138; Japan
- Coordinates: 36.7189°N 137.1648°E
- Operator: Ainokaze Toyama Railway
- Line: ■ Ainokaze Toyama Railway Line
- Distance: 36.8 km from Kurikara
- Platforms: 1 side + 1 island platforms
- Tracks: 3

Other information
- Status: Staffed
- Website: Official website

History
- Opened: 3 November 1908

Passengers
- FY2015: 1,734
Location
- Location within Japan

Kureha Station (呉羽駅, Kureha-eki) is a railway station on the Ainokaze Toyama Railway Line in the city of Toyama, Toyama Prefecture, Japan, operated by the third-sector railway operator Ainokaze Toyama Railway.

== Lines ==
Kureha Station is served by the Ainokaze Toyama Railway Line and is 36.8 kilometres from the starting point of the line at Kurikara.

== Station layout ==
Kureha Station has one side platform and one island platform connected by a footbridge. The station is staffed.

=== Platforms ===
1	■ Ainokaze Toyama Railway Line	for Takaoka and Kanazawa
2, 3	■ Ainokaze Toyama Railway Line	for Toyama and Uozu

== History ==
Kureha Station opened on 3 November 1908 as a station on the Japanese Government Railway (JGR). It was privatized on 1 April 1984, becoming a station on JR West.

From 14 March 2015, with the opening of the Hokuriku Shinkansen extension from Nagano to Kanazawa, local passenger operations over sections of the Hokuriku Main Line running roughly parallel to the new shinkansen line were reassigned to different third-sector railway operating companies. From this date, Kureha Station was transferred to the ownership of the third-sector operating company Ainokaze Toyama Railway.

== Adjacent stations ==
«	Service	»
Ainokaze Toyama Railway Line
Kosugi	Local	Toyama

== Passenger statistics ==
In fiscal 2015, the station was used by an average of 1,734 passengers daily (boarding passengers only).

== Surrounding area ==
- Toho Gakuen Graduate School

== See also ==
- List of railway stations in Japan
