= Shin-Toyamaguchi Station =

Railway station in Toyama, Japan

Shin-Toyamaguchi Station 新富山口駅
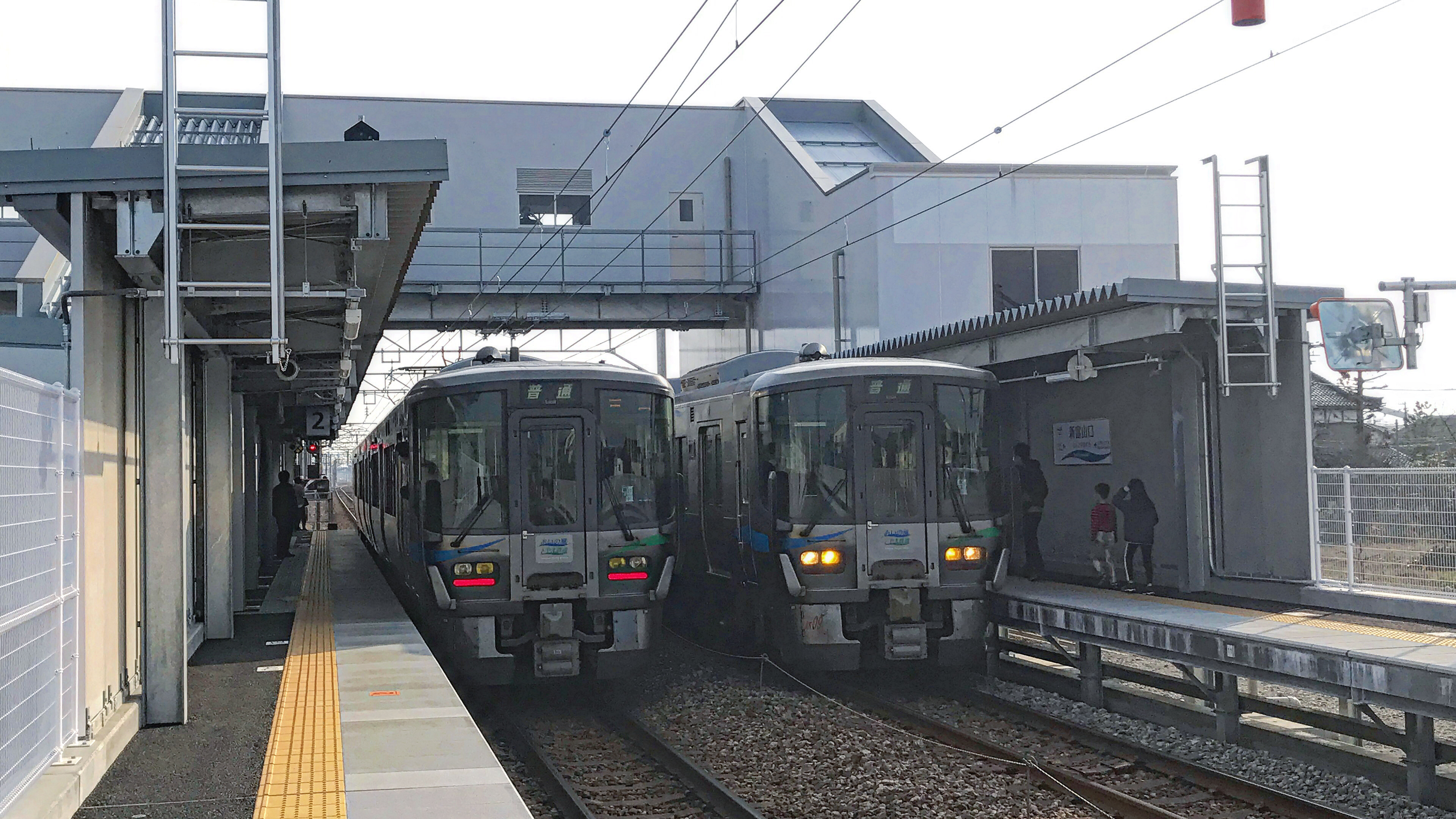
- Platforms in March 2022

General information
- Location: Shimofugo, Toyama-shi, Toyama-ken 930-0814; Japan
- Coordinates: 36.719691°N 137.240449°E
- Operator: Ainokaze Toyama Railway
- Line: ■ Ainokaze Toyama Railway Line
- Distance: 45.6 km from Kurikara
- Platforms: 2 side platforms
- Tracks: 2

Construction
- Structure type: Ground station

Other information
- Status: Unstaffed
- Website: Official website

History
- Opened: 12 March 2022

Services
| Preceding station | Ainokaze Toyama Railway | Following station |
|---|---|---|
| Toyama towards Kurikara | Ainokaze Toyama Railway Line Local | Higashi-Toyama towards Ichiburi |
Location
- Location within Toyama Prefecture Location within Japan

Shin-Toyamaguchi Station (新富山口駅, Shin-Toyamaguchi-eki) is a railway station on the Ainokaze Toyama Railway Line in the city of Toyama, Toyama Prefecture, Japan, operated by the third-sector railway operator Ainokaze Toyama Railway.

== Lines ==
Shin-Toyamaguchi Station is served by the Ainokaze Toyama Railway Line and is 45.6 kilometres from the starting point of the line at Kurikara.

== Station layout ==
Shin-Toyamaguchi Station has 2 side platforms connected by a footbridge. The station is unstaffed.

The platforms are 85 m (279 ft) in length, corresponding to the 4-car trains to be used at this station.

The station area used to be a freight sorting yard for the Japan Freight Railway Company.

=== Platforms ===
| 1 | ■ Ainokaze Toyama Railway Line | for Uozu and Itoigawa |
| 2 | ■ Ainokaze Toyama Railway Line | for Toyama and Kanazawa |

== Chronology ==
- 17 June 2014: Decision to erect a new station between Toyama and Higashi-Toyama Stations.
- 10 July 2019: Ministry of Land, Infrastructure, Transport and Tourism gave approval for the erection of a new station.
- 2020
  - 13 January: Construction started on the station facilities.
  - 20 October—18 November: A naming competition was run involving residents of Toyama and Toyama based fanclub members of the Ainokaze Toyama Railway.
- 2022
  - 17 February: The new station name was determined to be "Shin-Toyamaguchi".
  - 12 March: Opened to business.

== Surrounding area ==
Japan National Route 8

== See also ==
- List of railway stations in Japan
