= Kurobe Station =

Railway station in Kurobe, Toyama Prefecture, Japan

Kurobe Station 黒部駅
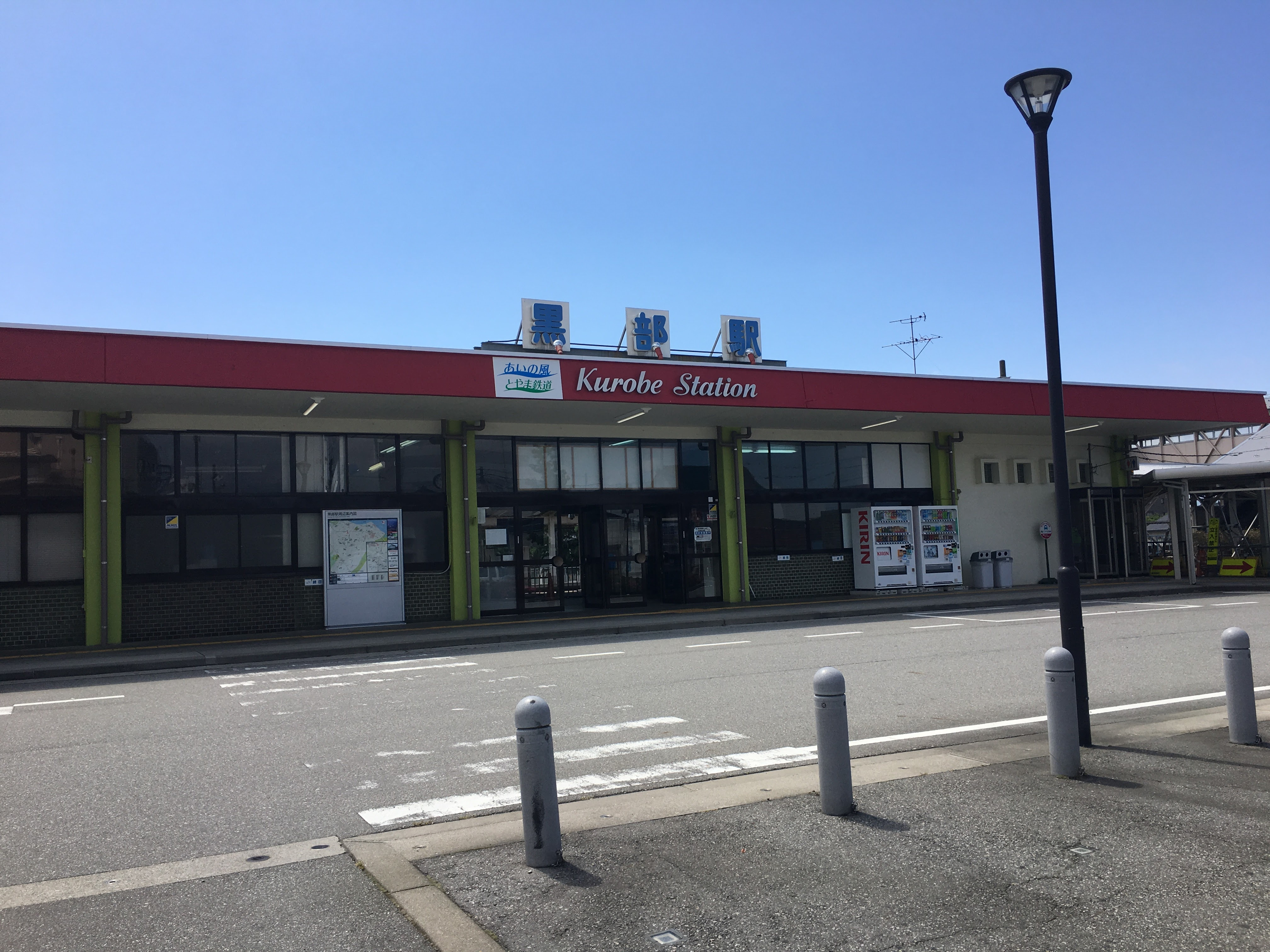
- Kurobe Station exterior in May 2017

General information
- Location: 5 Tenjinshin, Kurobe-shi, Toyama-ken 938-0042; Japan
- Coordinates: 36.8691°N 137.4343°E
- Operator: Ainokaze Toyama Railway; JR Freight
- Line: ■ Ainokaze Toyama Railway Line
- Distance: 73.4 km from Kurikara
- Platforms: 1 side + 1 island platforms
- Tracks: 3

Other information
- Status: Staffed
- Website: Official website

History
- Opened: 16 April 1910
- Former names: Mikkaichi (to 1956)

Passengers
- FY2015: 1,249 daily
Location
- Location within Japan

Kurobe Station (黒部駅, Kurobe-eki) is a railway station on the Ainokaze Toyama Railway Line in the city of Kurobe, Toyama, Japan, operated by the third-sector railway operator Ainokaze Toyama Railway. It is also a freight terminal for the Japan Freight Railway Company.

== Lines ==
Kurobe Station is served by the Ainokaze Toyama Railway Line and is 73.4 kilometres from the starting point of the line at Kurikara.

== Station layout ==
Kurobe Station has one ground-level side platform and one ground-level island platform connected by a footbridge. The station is staffed.

=== Platforms ===
1	■ Ainokaze Toyama Railway Line	for Toyama and Kanazawa
2, 3	■ Ainokaze Toyama Railway Line	for Tomari and Itoigawa

== Adjacent stations ==
«	Service	»
Ainokaze Toyama Railway Line
Uozu	Local	Ikuji

== History ==
The station opened on 16 April 1910 as Mikkaichi Station (三日市駅). It was renamed Kurobe Station on 10 April 1956. With the privatization of Japanese National Railways (JNR) on 1 April 1987, the station came under the control of JR West.

From 14 March 2015, with the opening of the Hokuriku Shinkansen extension from Nagano to Kanazawa, local passenger operations over sections of the former Hokuriku Main Line running roughly parallel to the new shinkansen line were reassigned to different third-sector railway operating companies. From this date, Kurobe Station was transferred to the ownership of the third-sector operating company Ainokaze Toyama Railway.

== Passenger statistics ==
In fiscal 2015, the station was used by an average of 1,249 passengers daily (boarding passengers only).

== Surrounding area ==
- YKK Makino factory
- Kurobe Public Hospital

== See also ==
- List of railway stations in Japan
