= Higashi-Toyama Station =

Railway station in Toyama, Toyama Prefecture, Japan

Higashi-Toyama Station 東富山駅
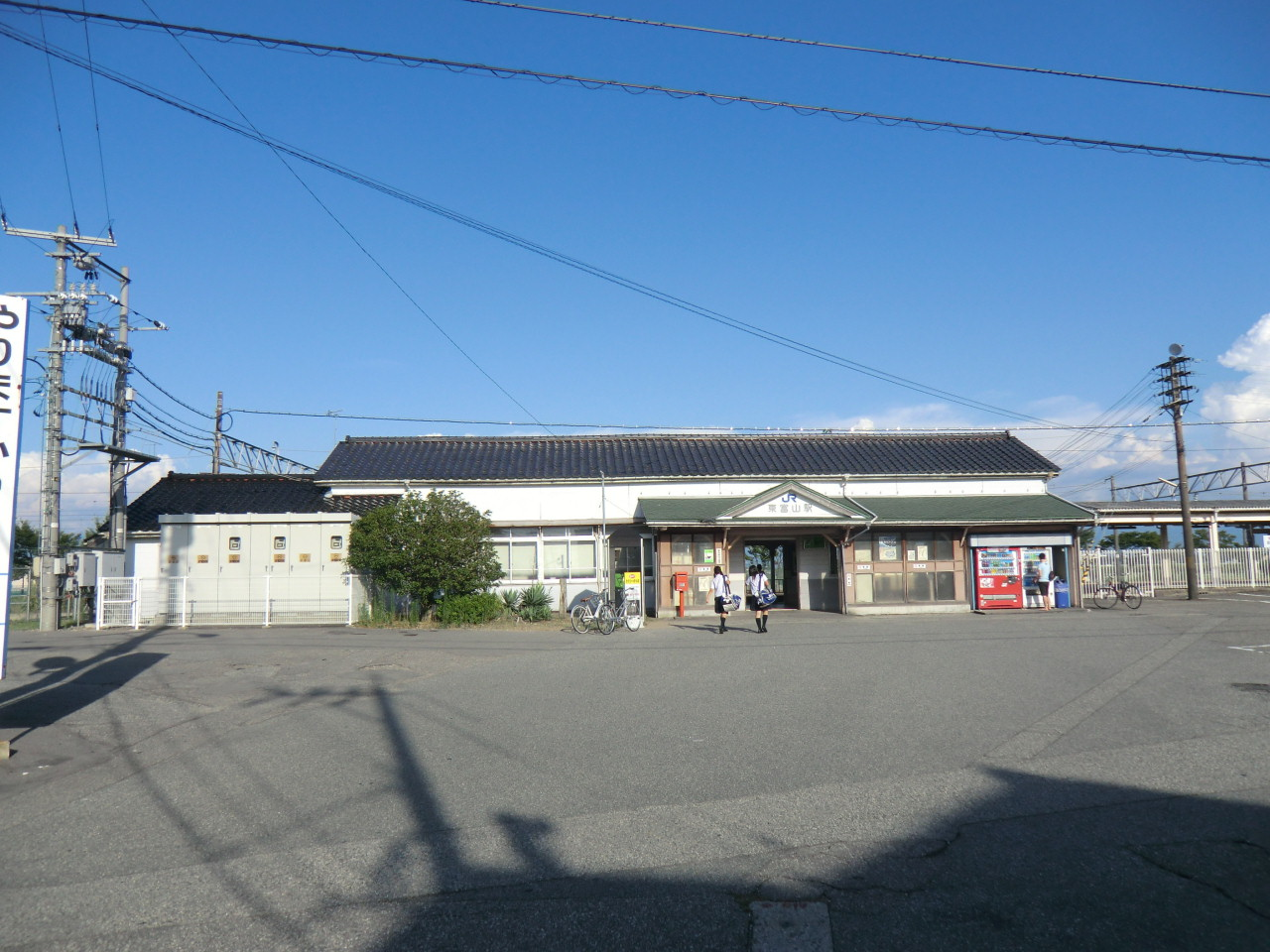
- Higashi-Toyama Station in August 2011

General information
- Location: 3-17-53 Higashi-Toyama Kotobuki-cho, Toyama-shi, Toyama-ken 931-8452; Japan
- Coordinates: 36.7414°N 137.2492°E
- Operator: Ainokaze Toyama Railway; JR Freight
- Line: ■ Ainokaze Toyama Railway Line
- Distance: 48.2 km from Kurikara
- Platforms: 1 side + 1 island platforms
- Tracks: 3

Other information
- Status: Staffed
- Website: Official website

History
- Opened: 16 November 1908

Passengers
- FY2015: 1,399 daily
Location
- Location within Japan

Higashi-Toyama Station (東富山駅, Higashi-Toyama-eki) is a railway station on the Ainokaze Toyama Railway Line in the city of Toyama, Toyama Prefecture, Japan, operated by the third-sector railway operator Ainokaze Toyama Railway. It is also a freight terminal for the Japan Freight Railway Company.

== Lines ==
Higashi-Toyama Station is served by the Ainokaze Toyama Railway Line and is 48.2 kilometres from the starting point of the line at Kurikara.

== Station layout ==
Higashi-Toyama Station has one side platform and one island platform connected by a footbridge. The station is staffed.

=== Platforms ===
1	■ Ainokaze Toyama Railway Line	for Uozu and Itoigawa
2, 3	■ Ainokaze Toyama Railway Line	for Toyama and Kanazawa

== History ==
Higashi-Toyama Station opened on 16 November 1908 as a station on the Japanese Government Railways (JGR), later becoming the Japanese National Railways (JNR). It was privatized on 1 April 1987, coming under the control of JR West.

From 14 March 2015, with the opening of the Hokuriku Shinkansen extension from Nagano to Kanazawa, local passenger operations over sections of the former Hokuriku Main Line running roughly parallel to the new shinkansen line were reassigned to different third-sector railway operating companies. From this date, Higashi-Toyama Station was transferred to the ownership of the third-sector operating company Ainokaze Toyama Railway.

== Adjacent stations ==
«	Service	»
Ainokaze Toyama Railway Line
Shin-Toyamaguchi	Local	Mizuhashi

== Passenger statistics ==
In fiscal 2015, the station was used by an average of 1,399 passengers daily (boarding passengers only).

== Surrounding area ==
- Toyama Municipal Baseball Stadium Alpen Stadium

== See also ==
- List of railway stations in Japan
