= Etchū-Daimon Station =

Railway station in Imizu, Toyama Prefecture, Japan

Etchū-Daimon Station 越中大門駅
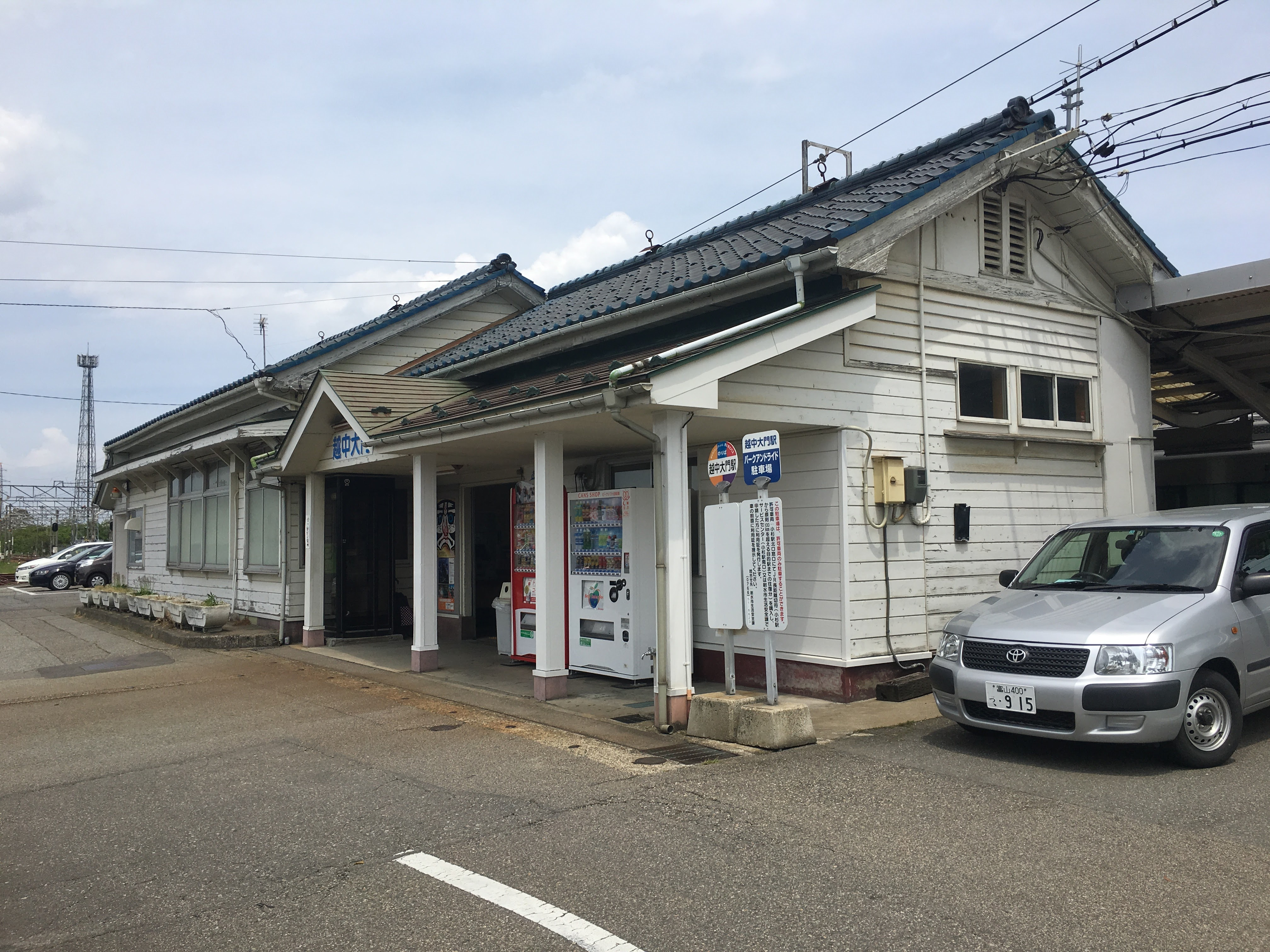
- Etchū-Daimon Station in May 2017

General information
- Location: 1442 Kojima, Imizu-shi, Toyama-ken 939-0274; Japan
- Coordinates: 36.7343°N 137.0547°E
- Operator: Ainokaze Toyama Railway
- Lines: ■ Ainokaze Toyama Railway Line; JR Freight
- Distance: 26.5 km from Kurikara
- Platforms: 1 side + 1 island platforms
- Tracks: 3

Other information
- Status: Staffed
- Website: Official website

History
- Opened: 15 October 1923

Passengers
- FY2015: 903
Location
- Location within Japan

Etchū-Daimon Station (越中大門駅, Etchū-Daimon-eki) is a railway station on the Ainokaze Toyama Railway Line in the city of Imizu, Toyama Prefecture, Japan, operated by the third-sector railway operator Ainokaze Toyama Railway. It is also a freight terminal for the Japan Freight Railway Company.

== Lines ==
Etchū-Daimon Station is served by the Ainokaze Toyama Railway Line and is 26.5 kilometres from the starting point of the line at Kurikara.

== Station layout ==
Etchū-Daimon Station has one side platform and one island platform connected by a footbridge. The station is staffed.

=== Platforms ===
1	■ Ainokaze Toyama Railway Line	for Takaoka and Kanazawa
2, 3	■ Ainokaze Toyama Railway Line	for Toyama and Uozu

== History ==
Etchū-Daimon Station opened on 15 October 1923 as a station on the Japanese Government Railway (JGR). It was privatized on 1 April 1984, becoming a station on JR West.

From 14 March 2015, with the opening of the Hokuriku Shinkansen extension from Nagano to Kanazawa, local passenger operations over sections of the Hokuriku Main Line running roughly parallel to the new shinkansen line were reassigned to different third-sector railway operating companies. From this date, Etchū-Daimon Station was transferred to the ownership of the third-sector operating company Ainokaze Toyama Railway.

== Adjacent stations ==
«	Service	»
Ainokaze Toyama Railway Line
Ainokaze Liner: Does not stop at this station
Takaoka	Local	Kosugi

== Passenger statistics ==
In fiscal 2015, the station was used by an average of 903 passengers daily (boarding passengers only).

== Surrounding area ==
- former Daimon Town Hall
- former Oshima Town Hall

== See also ==
- List of railway stations in Japan
