= Nishi-Nyūzen Station =

Railway station in Nyūzen, Toyama Prefecture, Japan

Nishi-Nyūzen Station 西入善駅
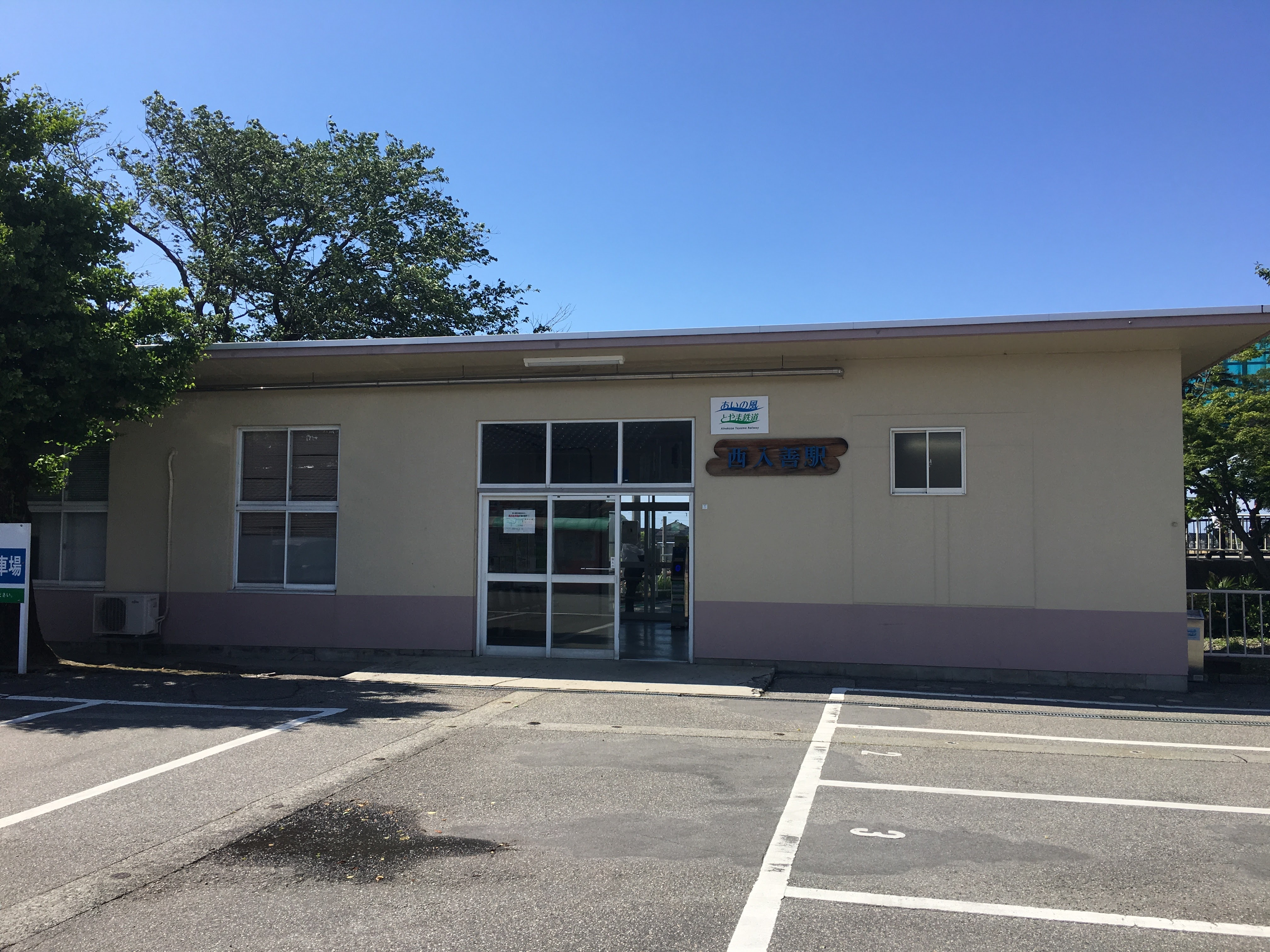
- Nishi-Nyūzen Station exterior in May 2017

General information
- Location: 392-2 Shimoiinoshin, Nyūzen-machi, Shimoniikawa-gun, Toyama-ken 939-0662; Japan
- Coordinates: 36.9303°N 137.4593°E
- Operator: Ainokaze Toyama Railway
- Line: ■ Ainokaze Toyama Railway Line
- Distance: 81.6 km from Kurikara
- Platforms: 2 side platforms
- Tracks: 2

Other information
- Status: Unstaffed
- Website: Official website

History
- Opened: 1 July 1960

Passengers
- FY2015: 229 daily
Location
- Location within Japan

Nishi-Nyūzen Station (西入善駅, Nishi-Nyūzen-eki; lit. "West Nyūzen Station") is a railway station on the Ainokaze Toyama Railway Line in the town of Nyūzen, Toyama, Japan, operated by the third-sector railway operator Ainokaze Toyama Railway.

== Lines ==
Nishi-Nyūzen Station is served by the Ainokaze Toyama Railway Line and is 81.6 kilometres from the starting point of the line at Kurikara.

== Station layout ==
Nyūzen Station has two opposed ground-level side platforms connected by a footbridge. The station is unattended.

=== Platforms ===
1	■ Ainokaze Toyama Railway Line	for Toyama and Kanazawa
2	■ Ainokaze Toyama Railway Line	for Tomari and Itoigawa

== History ==
Nishi-Nyūzen Station was opened on 1 July 1960. From 14 March 2015, with the opening of the Hokuriku Shinkansen extension from Nagano to Kanazawa, local passenger operations over sections of the former Hokuriku Main Line running roughly parallel to the new shinkansen line were reassigned to different third-sector railway operating companies. From this date, Nishi-Nyūzen Station was transferred to the ownership of the third-sector operating company Ainokaze Toyama Railway.

== Adjacent stations ==
«	Service	»
Ainokaze Toyama Railway Line
Ikuji	Local	Nyūzen

== Passenger statistics ==
In fiscal 2015, the station was used by an average of 229 passengers daily (boarding passengers only).

== Surrounding area ==
- National Route 8

== See also ==
- List of railway stations in Japan
