= Fukuoka Station =

Railway station in Takaoka, Toyama Prefecture, Japan

Fukuoka Station 福岡駅
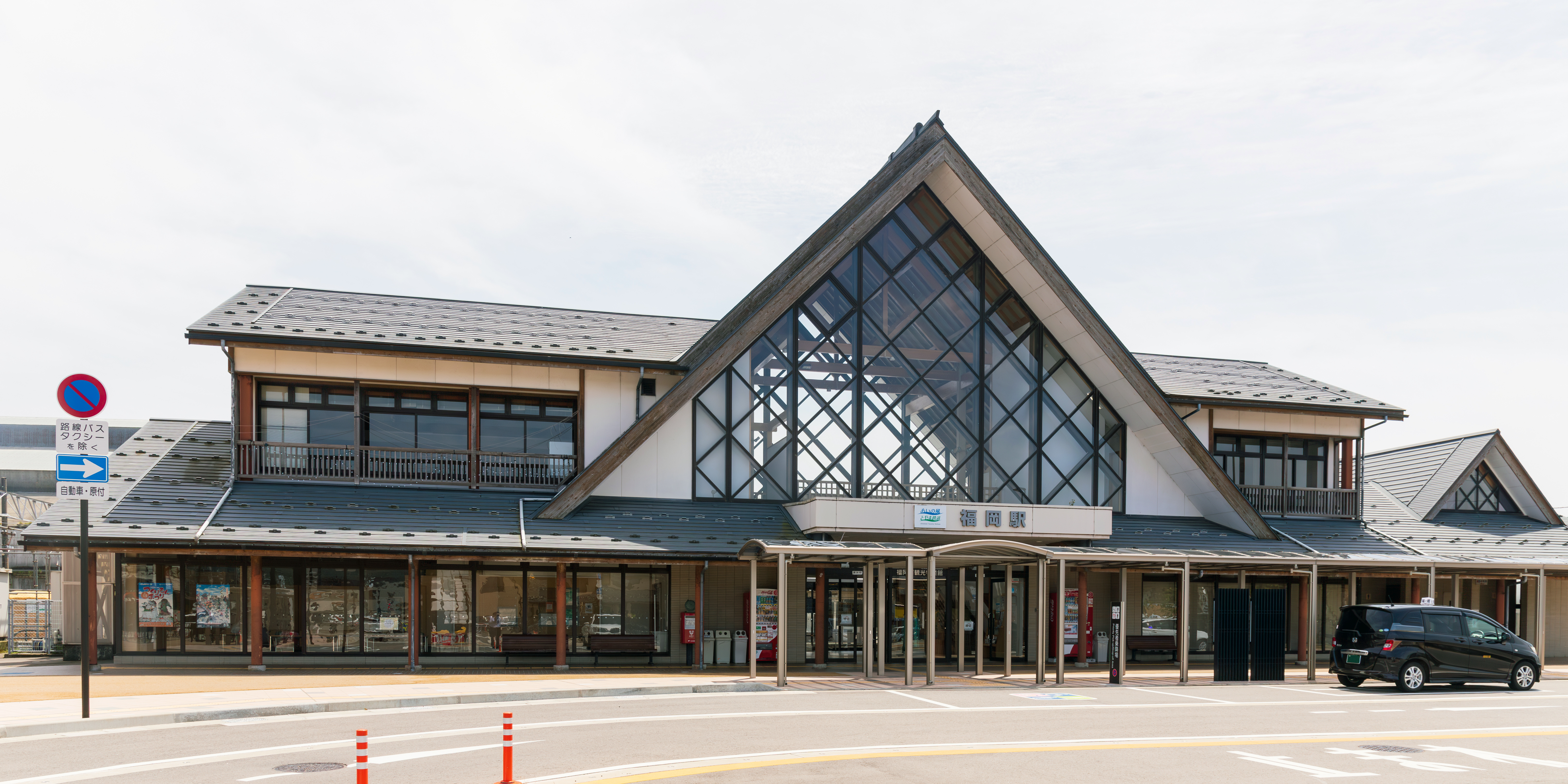
- Station Building (April 2024)

General information
- Location: 321 Fukuoka-cho Shimomino, Takaoka-shi, Toyama-ken 939-0116; Japan
- Coordinates: 36.7083°N 136.9322°E
- Operator: Ainokaze Toyama Railway
- Line: ■ Ainokaze Toyama Railway Line
- Distance: 14.0 km from Kurikara
- Platforms: 1 side + 1 island platforms
- Tracks: 3

Other information
- Status: Staffed
- Website: Official website

History
- Opened: 1 November 1898

Passengers
- FY2015: 1,041
Location
- Location within Japan

Fukuoka Station (福岡駅, Fukuoka-eki) is a railway station on the Ainokaze Toyama Railway Line in the Fukuoka neighbourhood of the city of Takaoka, Toyama Prefecture, Japan, operated by the Ainokaze Toyama Railway, which is a third-sector operator. This station is named after Fukuoka, Toyama, not the city of Fukuoka in Kyushu, the main station of which is named Hakata.

== Lines ==
Fukuoka Station is served by the Ainokaze Toyama Railway Line and is 14.0 kilometres from the starting point of the line at Kurikara.

== Station layout ==
Fukuoka Station has one side platform and one island platform connected by a footbridge. The station is staffed.

=== Platforms ===
1	■ Ainokaze Toyama Railway Line	for Takaoka and Toyama
2	■ Ainokaze Toyama Railway Line	for Kanazawa

== History ==
Fukuoka Station opened on 1 November 1898 as a station on the Japanese Government Railway (JGR). It was privatized on 1 April 1984, becoming a station on JR West.

From 14 March 2015, with the opening of the Hokuriku Shinkansen extension from Nagano to Kanazawa, local passenger operations over sections of the Hokuriku Main Line running roughly parallel to the new shinkansen line were reassigned to different third-sector railway operating companies. From this date, Fukuoka Station was transferred to the ownership of the third-sector operating company Ainokaze Toyama Railway.

== Adjacent stations ==
«	Service	»
Ainokaze Toyama Railway Line
Isurugi	Local	Nishi-Takaoka

== Passenger statistics ==
In fiscal 2015, the station was used by an average of 1,041 passengers daily (boarding passengers only).

== Surrounding area ==
- Fukuoka high School

== See also ==
- List of railway stations in Japan
