= Mizuhashi Station =

Railway station in Toyama, Toyama Prefecture, Japan

Mizuhashi Station 水橋駅
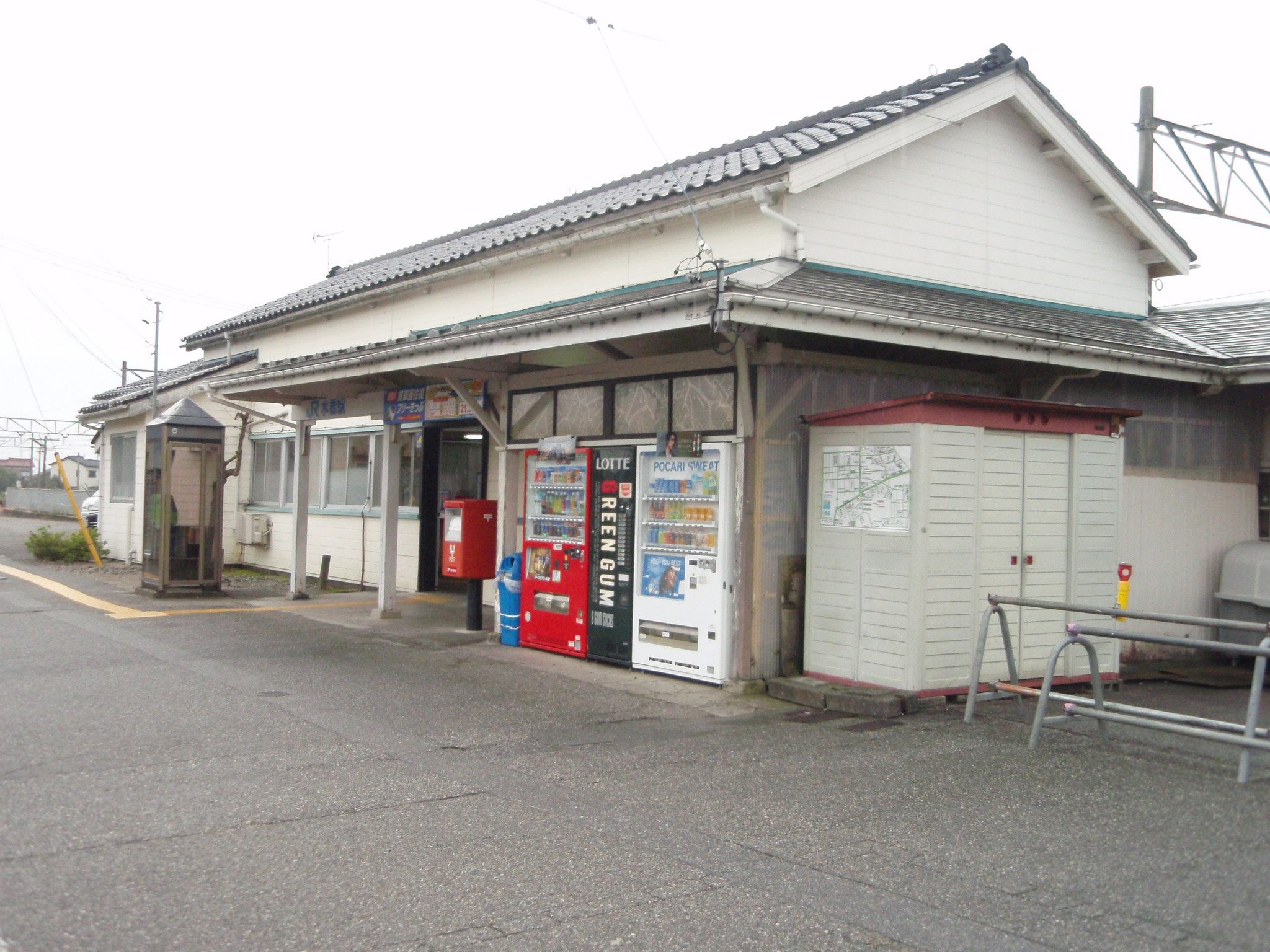
- Mizuhashi Station in September 2009

General information
- Location: 676-2 Mizuhashi Iseya, Toyama-shi, Toyama-ken 939-3524; Japan
- Coordinates: 36.7435°N 137.2982°E
- Operator: Ainokaze Toyama Railway
- Line: ■ Ainokaze Toyama Railway Line
- Distance: 53.1 km from Kurikara
- Platforms: 2 side platforms
- Tracks: 2

Other information
- Status: Staffed
- Website: Official website

History
- Opened: 16 November 1908

Passengers
- FY2015: 965 daily
Location
- Location within Japan

Mizuhashi Station (水橋駅, Mizuhashi-eki) is a railway station on the Ainokaze Toyama Railway Line in the city of Toyama, Toyama Prefecture, Japan, operated by the third-sector railway operator Ainokaze Toyama Railway.

== Lines ==
Mizuhashi Station is served by the Ainokaze Toyama Railway Line and is 53.1 kilometres from the starting point of the line at Kurikara.

== Station layout ==
Mizuhashi Station has two opposed ground-level side platforms connected by a footbridge. The station is staffed.

=== Platforms ===
1	■ Ainokaze Toyama Railway Line	for Uozu and Itoigawa
2	■ Ainokaze Toyama Railway Line	for Toyama and Kanazawa

== History ==
Mizuhashi Station opened on 16 November 1908 as a station on the Japanese Government Railways (JGR), later becoming the Japanese National Railways (JNR). It was privatized on 1 April 1987, becoming a station on JR West.

From 14 March 2015, with the opening of the Hokuriku Shinkansen extension from Nagano to Kanazawa, local passenger operations over sections of the former Hokuriku Main Line running roughly parallel to the new shinkansen line were reassigned to different third-sector railway operating companies. From this date, Mizuhashi Station was transferred to the ownership of the third-sector operating company Ainokaze Toyama Railway.

== Adjacent stations ==
«	Service	»
Ainokaze Toyama Railway Line
Higashi-Toyama	Local	Namerikawa

== Passenger statistics ==
In fiscal 2015, the station was used by an average of 965 passengers daily (boarding passengers only).

== Surrounding area ==
- Mizuhashi Post Office
- Mizuhashi High School

== See also ==
- List of railway stations in Japan
