= Jōbenoma Site =

Archaeological site in Nyūzen, Toyama, Japan

Coordinates: 36°57′15.41″N 137°29′41.5″E

- じょうべのま遺跡 (Japanese)
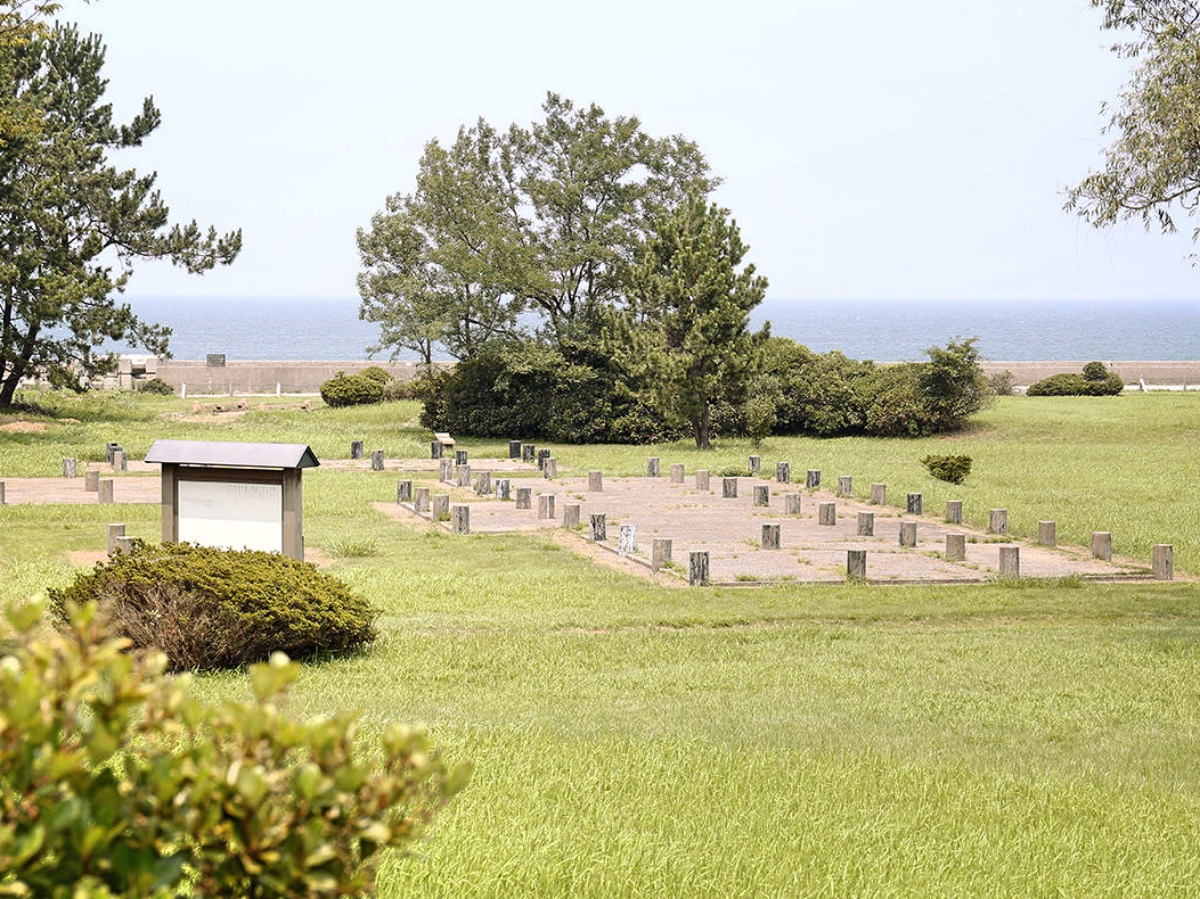
- Jōbenoma Site

- Location in Japan Jōbenoma Site (Japan)
- Type: settlement
- Periods: Heian period
- Location: Nyūzen, Toyama, Japan
- Region: Hokuriku region

History
- Built: 9th century

Site notes
- Condition: ruins
- Public access: Yes (public park)

The Jōbenoma Site (じょうべのま遺跡, Jōbenoma iseki) is an archaeological site consisting of the Heian period ruins of a shōen located in what is now the Tanaka neighborhood of the town of Nyūzen in the Hokuriku region Japan. It has been protected as a National Historic Site since 1979.

== Overview ==
The shōen or medieval landed estates in Japan, were private, tax-free, and autonomous feudal manors which arose with the decline of the ritsuryō system. The earliest shōen developed in the Nara period to encourage land reclamation and provided for the succession of the right to cultivate reclaimed fields in perpetuity. Later shōen developed from land tracts assigned to officially sanctioned Shintō shrines or Buddhist temples or granted by the emperor as gifts to the Imperial relatives, nobles, or officials as tax-free grants. In either case, as these estates grew, they became independent of the civil administrative system and contributed to the rise of a local military class. At first, the hereditary steward of the estate (jitō) paid a portion of his revenues to the nominal "owner" in Kyoto for continued protection from taxes or other interference from the government, but by the Kamakura period, even this nominal relationship faded away.

The Jōbenoma Site is located at the eastern end of Toyama Bay on the right bank of the delta of the Kurobe River, on the coastline of the Sea of Japan. It was discovered in 1941, but a full-scale archaeological excavation did not begin until the 1970s when the site was endangered by a farmland improvement project. The site has been excavated 17 times since 1970, so the complete area is now clear. In total, the remains of 21 buildings were confirmed, with an estimated age from the 9th to the 10th centuries. The buildings were reconstructed at least six times during two periods: the first half of the Heian period and the first part of the Kamakura period. The buildings were arranged in a U-shape around a large main building, which is presumed to be the manor house of the shōen. A stream with a width of 30 meters once flowed from the south to the north through the site, with the building complex surrounded by walls on the west bank.

Most of the artifacts discovered date from the Heian period, and include Sue ware and Suzu ware pottery shards, wooden note tags, glazed pottery shards and fragments of agricultural implements. From historical records it is known that there were several shōen in this area. The discovery of shards of Chinese blue and white celadon porcelain found at the site, leads to the conclusion that this shōen was part of the estates held by either the temple of Tōdai-ji or of Saidai-ji in Nara.

It is one of the few manor sites from the Heian period thus found in Japan. The site is now an archaeological park, which has been open to the public since April 1990, with concrete pillars marking the locations of foundation posts. It is located about a 15-minute walk from Nyūzen Station on the JR West Hokuriku Main Line.

== See also ==
- List of Historic Sites of Japan (Toyama)
