= Takaoka-Yabunami Station =

Railway station in Takaoka, Toyama Prefecture, Japan

Takaoka-Yabunami Station 高岡やぶなみ駅
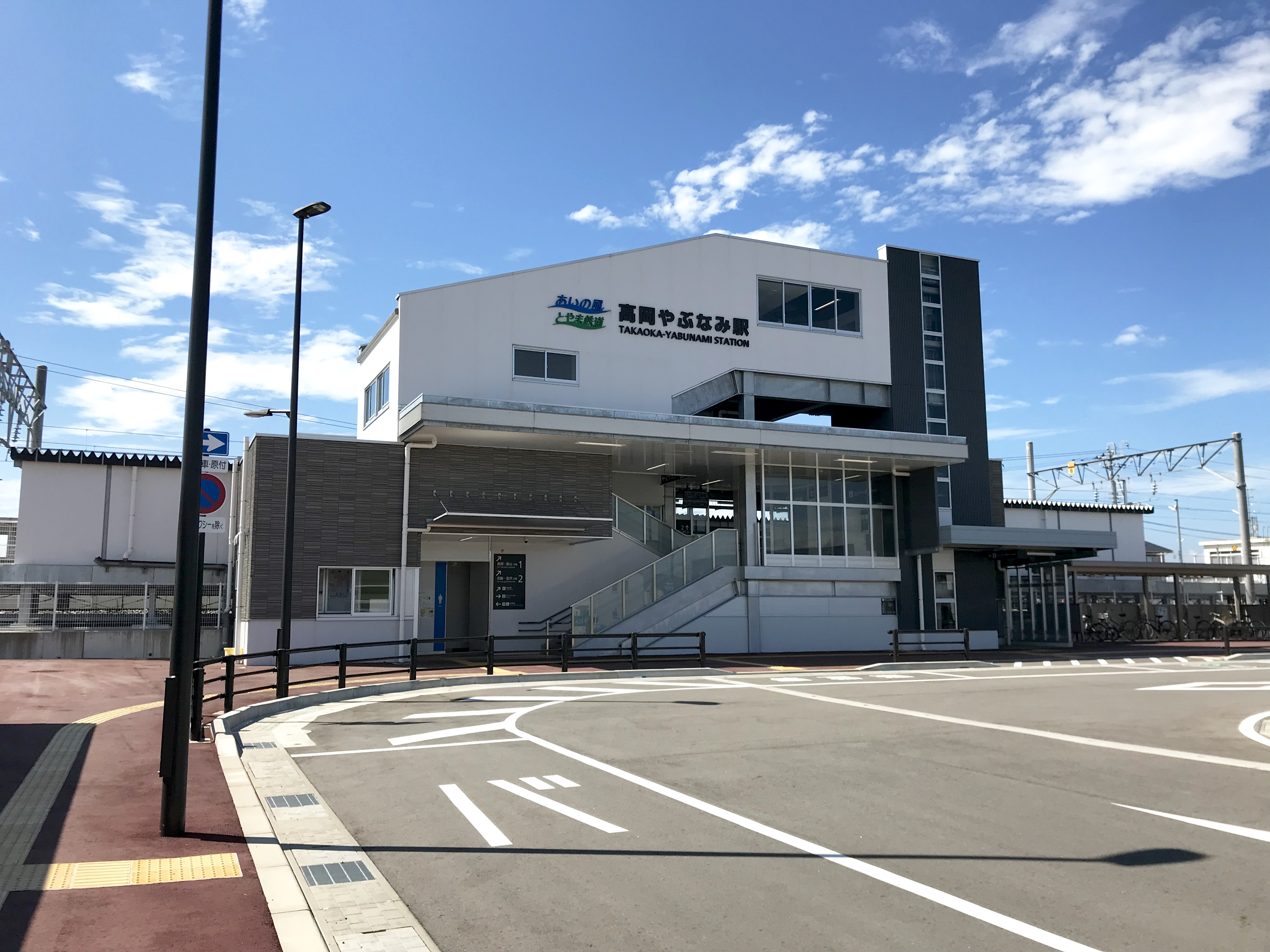
- The east entrance in August 2019

General information
- Location: Takaoka-shi, Toyama-ken; Japan
- Coordinates: 36.737528°N 136.988889°E
- Operator: Ainokaze Toyama Railway
- Line: ■ Ainokaze Toyama Railway Line
- Distance: 20.2 km from Kurikara
- Platforms: 2 side platforms
- Tracks: 2

Other information
- Status: Open

History
- Opening: March 2018

Passengers
- 1,800 daily (forecast)
Location
- Location within Japan

Takaoka-Yabunami Station (高岡やぶなみ駅, Takaoka-Yabunami Station-eki) is a railway station on the Ainokaze Toyama Railway Line in Takaoka, Toyama, Japan which is operated by the third-sector railway operating company Ainokaze Toyama Railway from March 2018.

== Lines ==
Takaoka-Yabunami Station is served by the 100.1 km (62.2 mi) Ainokaze Toyama Railway Line from Kurikara to Ichiburi, lying 2.7 km (1.7 mi) from Nishi-Takaoka Station in the west and 2.6 km (1.6 mi) from Takaoka Station in the east.

== Station layout ==
The station has two side platforms serving two tracks, with station entrances on either side. The platforms are 85 m (279 ft) long, capable of handling four-car trains.

== Adjacent stations ==
«	Service	»
Ainokaze Toyama Railway
Nishi-Takaoka	Local	Takaoka

== History ==
A ground-breaking ceremony was held at the site of the new station on 25 December 2016.

The name for the new station was formally announced on 15 February 2017. The name was selected in a public ballot held in December 2016 from a choice of three candidate names: Takaoka-Yabunami (高岡やぶなみ), Katakagonosato (かたかごの里), and Etchu-Takaoka (越中高岡), with Takaoka-Yabunami receiving 276 votes, 35.4% of the total. The station opened in March 2018.

== Passenger statistics ==
The station is forecast to be used by an average of around 1,800 passengers daily.

== See also ==
- List of railway stations in Japan
