= Nishi-Takaoka Station =

Railway station in Takaoka, Toyama Prefecture, Japan

Nishi-Takaoka Station 西高岡駅
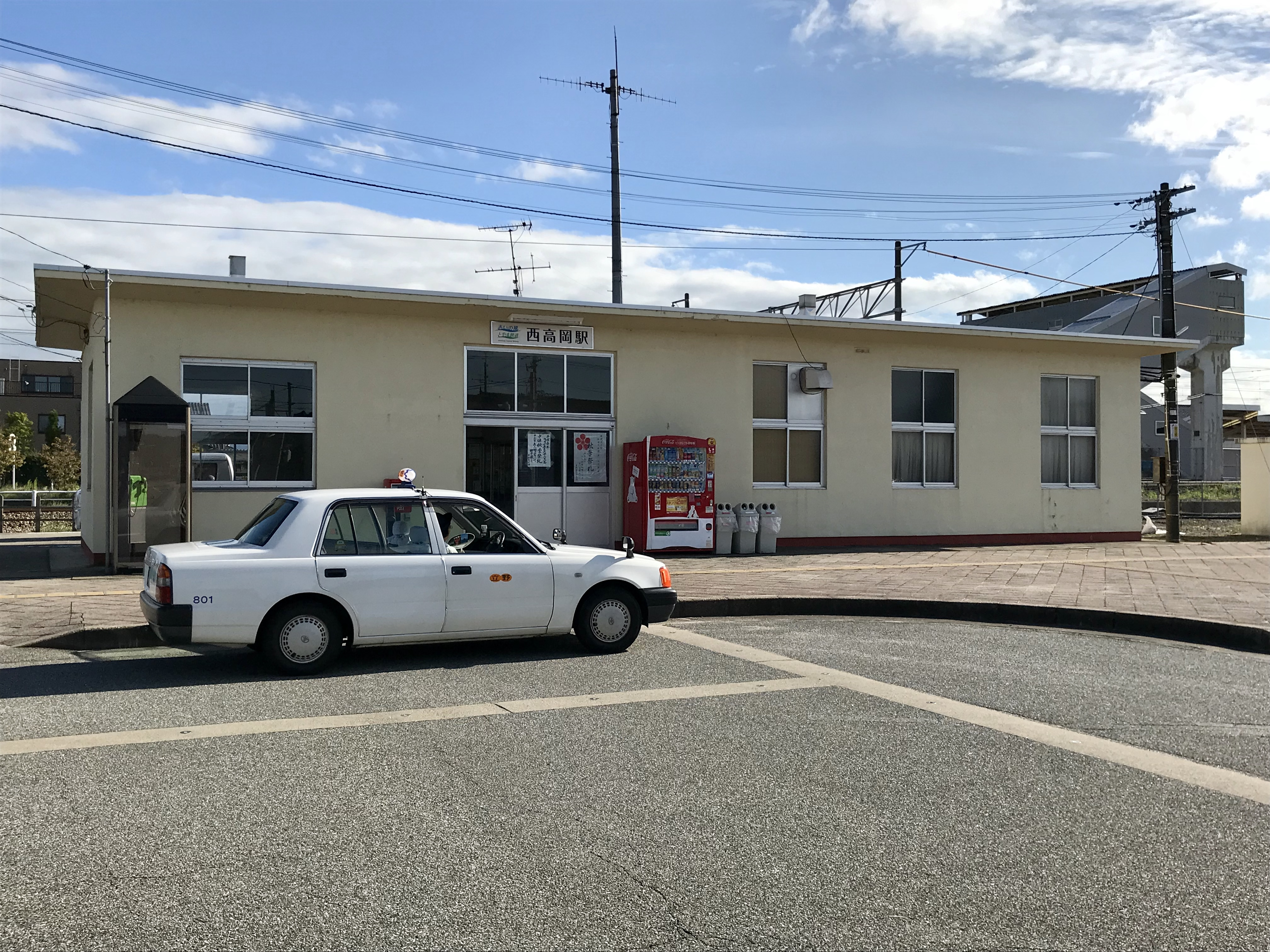
- Nishi-Takaoka Station in 2018

General information
- Location: 219 Tateno Takaike-cho, Takaoka-shi, Toyama-ken 933-0325; Japan
- Coordinates: 36.7245°N 136.9654°E
- Operator: Ainokaze Toyama Railway
- Line: ■ Ainokaze Toyama Railway Line
- Distance: 17.5 km from Kurikara
- Platforms: 2 side platforms
- Tracks: 2

Other information
- Status: Staffed
- Website: Official website

History
- Opened: 25 April 1957

Passengers
- FY2015: 597
Location
- Location within Japan

Nishi-Takaoka Station (西高岡駅, Nishi-Takaoka-eki) is a railway station on the Ainokaze Toyama Railway Line in the city of Takaoka, Toyama Prefecture, Japan, operated by the third-sector railway operator Ainokaze Toyama Railway.

== Lines ==
Nishi-Takaoka Station is served by the Ainokaze Toyama Railway Line and is 17.5 kilometres from the starting point of the line at Kurikara.

== Station layout ==
Nishi-Takaoka Station has two ground-level opposed side platforms connected by a footbridge. The station is attended.

=== Platforms ===
1	■ Ainokaze Toyama Railway Line	for Takaoka and Toyama
2	■ Ainokaze Toyama Railway Line	for Kanazawa

== History ==
Nishi-Takaoka Station opened on 25 April 1957 as a station on the Japanese National Railways (JNR). It was privatized on 1 April 1984, becoming a station on JR West.

From 14 March 2015, with the opening of the Hokuriku Shinkansen extension from Nagano to Kanazawa, local passenger operations over sections of the Hokuriku Main Line running roughly parallel to the new shinkansen line were reassigned to different third-sector railway operating companies. From this date, Nishi-Takaoka Station was transferred to the ownership of the third-sector operating company Ainokaze Toyama Railway.

== Adjacent stations ==
«	Service	»
Ainokaze Toyama Railway Line
Fukuoka	Local	Takaoka-Yabunami

== Passenger statistics ==
In fiscal 2015, the station was used by an average of 597 passengers daily (boarding passengers only).

== Surrounding area ==
- Hokuriku Coca-Cola Bottling

== See also ==
- List of railway stations in Japan
