= Higashi-Namerikawa Station =

Railway station in Namerikawa, Toyama Prefecture, Japan

Higashi-Namerikawa Station 東滑川駅
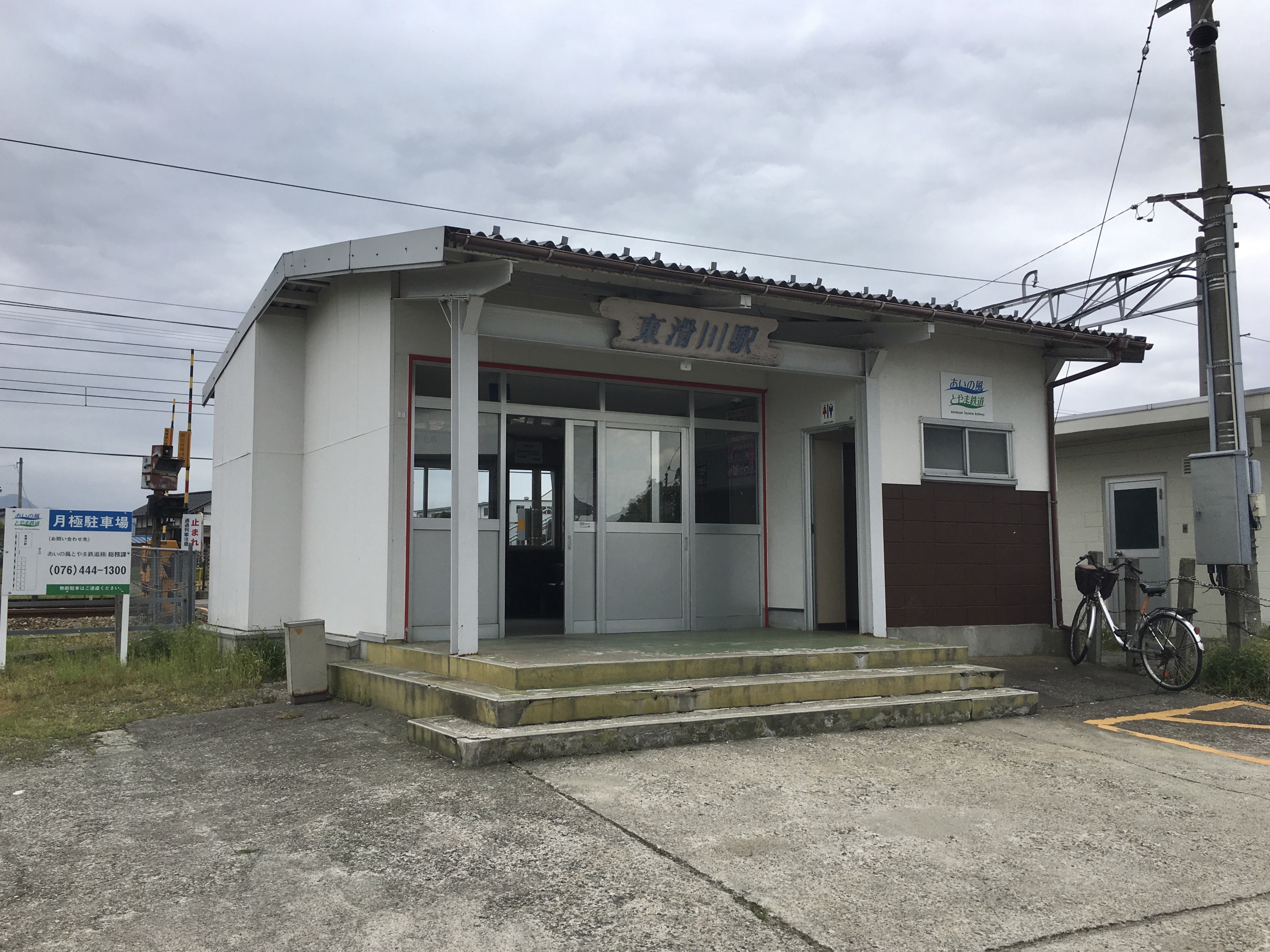
- Higashi-Namerikawa Station in August 2008

General information
- Location: 1512 Nakamura, Namerkawa-shi, Toyama-ken 936-0002; Japan
- Coordinates: 36.7878°N 137.3779°E
- Operator: Ainokaze Toyama Railway
- Line: ■ Ainokaze Toyama Railway Line
- Distance: 62.1 km from Kurikara
- Platforms: 2 side platforms
- Tracks: 2

Other information
- Status: Unattended
- Website: Official website

History
- Opened: 20 November 1964

Passengers
- FY2015: 154 daily
Location
- Location within Japan

Higashi-Namerikawa Station (東滑川駅, Higashi-Namerikawa-eki) is a railway station on the Ainokaze Toyama Railway Line in the city of Namerikawa, Toyama Prefecture, Japan, operated by the third-sector railway operator Ainokaze Toyama Railway.

== Lines ==
Higashi-Namerikawa Station is served by the Ainokaze Toyama Railway Line and is 62.1 kilometres from the starting point of the line at Kurikara.

== Station layout ==
Higashi-Namerikawa Station has two opposed ground-level side platforms connected by a level crossing. The station is unattended.

=== Platforms ===
1	■ Ainokaze Toyama Railway Line	for Uozu and Itoigawa
2	■ Ainokaze Toyama Railway Line	for Toyama and Kanazawa

== History ==
Higashi-Namerikawa Station opened on 20 November 1964 as a station on the Japanese National Railways (JNR). It was privatized on 1 April 1984, becoming a station on JR West.

From 14 March 2015, with the opening of the Hokuriku Shinkansen extension from Nagano to Kanazawa, local passenger operations over sections of the former Hokuriku Main Line running roughly parallel to the new shinkansen line were reassigned to different third-sector railway operating companies. From this date, Higashi-Namerikawa Station was transferred to the ownership of the third-sector operating company Ainokaze Toyama Railway

== Adjacent stations ==
«	Service	»
Ainokaze Toyama Railway Line
Namerikawa	Local	Uozu

== Passenger statistics ==
In fiscal 2015, the station was used by an average of 154 passengers daily (boarding passengers only).

== Surrounding area ==
- Etchu-Nakamura on the Toyama Chiho Railway

== See also ==
- List of railway stations in Japan
