= Ainokaze Toyama Railway =

Third-sector railway operating company in Japan

Coordinates: 36°42′9.3″N 137°12′47.2″E

- Native name: あいの風とやま鉄道
- Company type: Third sector
- Genre: Rail transport
- Founded: 24 July 2012
- Headquarters: Toyama, Toyama, Japan
- Area served: Toyama Prefecture
- Services: Passenger railway
- Number of employees: 155 (as of January 2015)
- Website: ainokaze.co.jp

The Ainokaze Toyama Railway (あいの風とやま鉄道株式会社, Ainokaze Toyama Tetsudō Kabushiki-gaisha) is a Japanese third-sector railway operating company established in 2012 to operate passenger railway services on the section of the JR West Hokuriku Main Line within Toyama Prefecture when it was separated from the JR West network in March 2015, coinciding with the opening of the Hokuriku Shinkansen extension from Nagano to Kanazawa. The company was founded on 24 July 2012, and has its headquarters in Toyama in Toyama Prefecture.

== Shareholders ==
As of 2013, Toyama Prefecture is the main shareholder, owning 63% of the company's shares, 27% is owned by municipalities within Toyama Prefecture, and 10% is owned by private-sector businesses.

== Ainokaze Toyama Railway Line ==
Ainokaze Toyama Railway Line

Overview
- Native name: あいの風とやま鉄道線
- Status: Operational
- Owner: Ainokaze Toyama Railway
- Locale: Ishikawa Prefecture; Toyama Prefecture; Niigata Prefecture
- Termini: Kurikara; Ichiburi
- Stations: 23

Service
- Type: Regional rail
- Rolling stock: 413 series/521 series EMUs

History
- Opened: 1898

Technical
- Line length: 100.1 km (62.2 mi)
- Track gauge: 1,067 mm (3 ft 6 in)
- Electrification: 20 kV AC (60 Hz)

From 14 March 2015, the Ainokaze Toyama Railway took over control of local passenger operations on the 100.1 km section JR West Hokuriku Main Line between Ichiburi in neighbouring Niigata Prefecture and Kurikara in neighbouring Ishikawa Prefecture, with a total of 23 stations.

=== Service outline ===
While the Ainokaze Toyama Railway Line officially stretches from Kurikara in the west to Ichiburi in the east, most services terminate at Tomari to the east, with a same-platform transfer provided to Echigo Tokimeki Railway Nihonkai Hisui Line services. Some through services continue over the Echigo Tokimeki Railway Nihonkai Hisui Line to and from Itoigawa. To the west, most services continue to and from Kanazawa over the IR Ishikawa Railway Line. In addition to all-stations "Local" (普通, futsū) services, limited-stop "Rapid" services named Ainokaze Liner (あいの風ライナー) operate between Tomari and Toyama or Kanazawa during the weekday morning and evening peaks. A supplementary liner fare of 300 yen is required to board these services, and all seats are reserved.

ICOCA and other compatible IC farecards can be used on the line since 26 March 2015.

=== Stations ===
Legend
| - All Ainokaze liner trains pass
O - All Ainokaze liner trains stop

Station	Japanese	Liner	Transfers	Location	
↑ Through service to/from Kanazawa on the IR Ishikawa Railway Line ↑
Kurikara	倶利伽羅	|	IR Ishikawa Railway Line	Tsubata	Ishikawa Prefecture
Isurugi	石動	O		Oyabe	Toyama Prefecture
Fukuoka	福岡	|		Takaoka	Toyama Prefecture
Nishi-Takaoka	西高岡	|		Takaoka	Toyama Prefecture
Takaoka-Yabunami	高岡やぶなみ	|		Takaoka	Toyama Prefecture
Takaoka	高岡	O	Jōhana Line; Himi Line; Manyōsen Takaoka Kidō Line (Takaoka Station)	Takaoka	Toyama Prefecture
Etchū-Daimon	越中大門	|		Imizu	Toyama Prefecture
Kosugi	小杉	O		Imizu	Toyama Prefecture
Kureha	呉羽	|		Toyama	Toyama Prefecture
Toyama	富山	O	Toyama Chihō Railway Toyamakō Line (Toyama-Eki); Toyama Chiho Railway Main Line (Dentetsu-Toyama), Toyama City Tram Line (Toyama-Eki); Hokuriku Shinkansen; Takayama Main Line	Toyama	Toyama Prefecture
Shin-Toyamaguchi	新富山口	|		Toyama	Toyama Prefecture
Higashi-Toyama	東富山	|		Toyama	Toyama Prefecture
Mizuhashi	水橋	|		Toyama	Toyama Prefecture
Namerikawa	滑川	O	Toyama Chiho Railway Main Line	Namerikawa	Toyama Prefecture
Higashi-Namerikawa	東滑川	|		Namerikawa	Toyama Prefecture
Uozu	魚津	O	Toyama Chiho Railway Main Line (Shin-Uozu)	Uozu	Toyama Prefecture
Kurobe	黒部	O		Kurobe	Toyama Prefecture
Ikuji	生地	|		Kurobe	Toyama Prefecture
Nishi-Nyūzen	西入善	|		Nyūzen	Toyama Prefecture
Nyūzen	入善	O		Nyūzen	Toyama Prefecture
Tomari	泊	O	Echigo Tokimeki Railway Nihonkai Hisui Line	Asahi	Toyama Prefecture
Etchū-Miyazaki	越中宮崎			Asahi	Toyama Prefecture
Ichiburi	市振		Echigo Tokimeki Railway Nihonkai Hisui Line	Itoigawa	Niigata Prefecture
↓ Through service to/from Itoigawa and Naoetsu on the Echigo Tokimeki Railway Nihonkai Hisui Line ↓

=== Rolling stock ===
Services on the line use a fleet of 16 two-car 521 series (2nd-batch type) electric multiple unit (EMU) trains and five three-car 413 series EMUs (former sets B01 to B03, B07, and B10) acquired from JR West. The 521 series trains will receive a new livery with a blue wave design on the seaward (north) side and a green wave design on the landward (south) side. While both the Ainokaze Toyama Railway and neighbouring IR Ishikawa Railway operate similar 521 series trains, the respective operators' trains do not run coupled together.

As of 1 October 2017, the 521 series and 413 series fleets are as follows.

==== 521 series ====
Set No.	Former JR West set No.	Manufacturer	Delivery date
AK01	G06	Kinki Sharyo	27 October 2009
AK02	G07	Kinki Sharyo	27 October 2009
AK03	G08	Kinki Sharyo	22 December 2009
AK04	G09	Kinki Sharyo	22 December 2009
AK05	G11	Kinki Sharyo	15 February 2010
AK06	G12	Kinki Sharyo	15 February 2010
AK07	G13	Kinki Sharyo	2 March 2010
AK08	G15	Kinki Sharyo	2 March 2010
AK09	G16	Kawasaki Heavy Industries	18 December 2010
AK10	G17	Kawasaki Heavy Industries	18 December 2010
AK11	G18	Kawasaki Heavy Industries	18 December 2010
AK12	G21	Kawasaki Heavy Industries	12 January 2011
AK13	G23	Kawasaki Heavy Industries	26 January 2011
AK14	G24	Kawasaki Heavy Industries	26 January 2011
AK15	G31	Kawasaki Heavy Industries	24 February 2011
AK16	G32	Kawasaki Heavy Industries	24 February 2011

==== 413 series ====
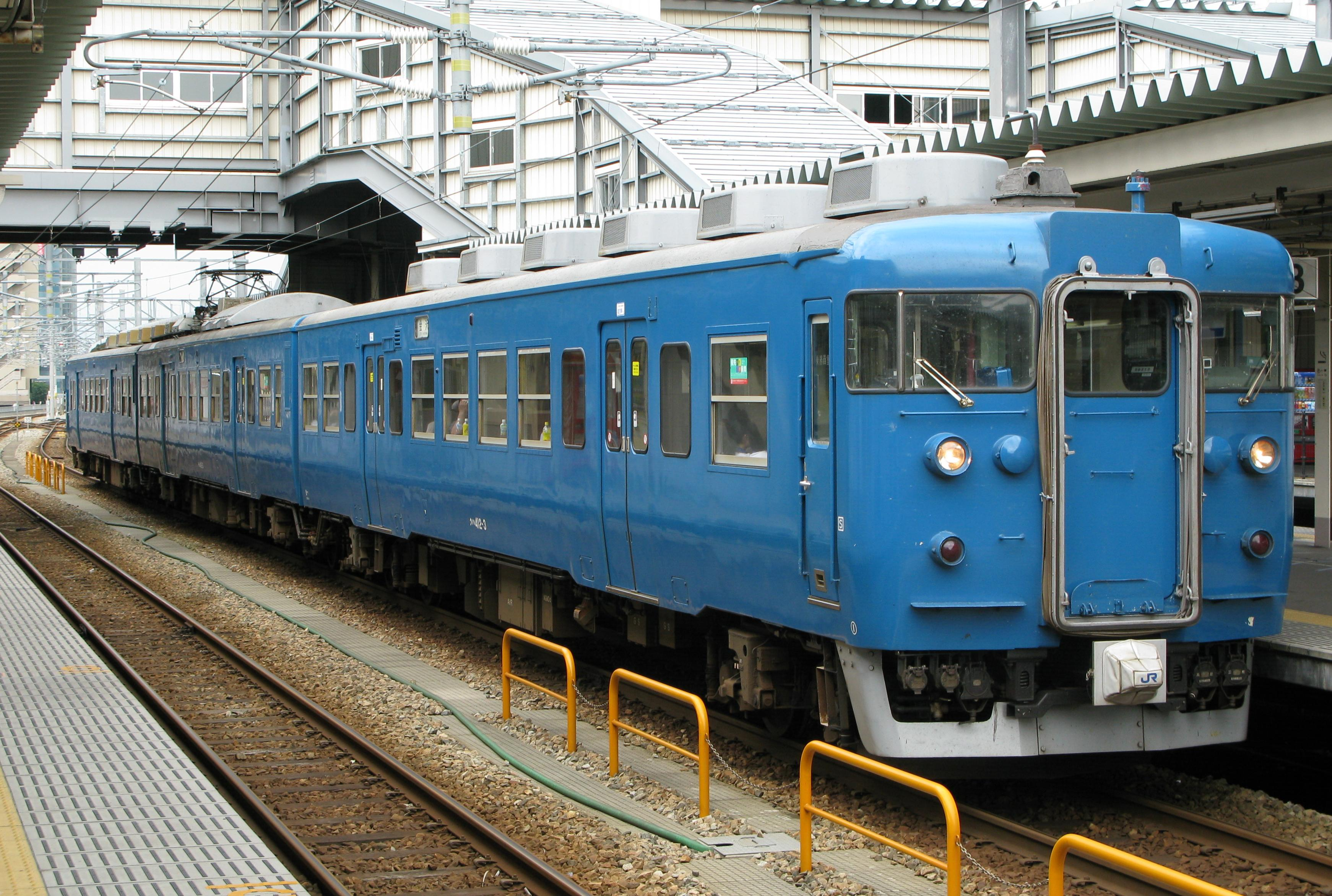
JR West 413 series EMU set B03

Set No.	Former JR West set No.	Livery
AM01	B01	Hokuriku white/blue
AM02	B02	Hokuriku white/blue
AM03	B03	Black (Toyama Emaki special event train)
AM04	B07	All-over blue No. 1
AM05	B10	All-over blue No. 1

Set AM03 was modified for use as a special-event train, named Toyama Emaki (とやま絵巻) with new seat covers and a new external livery, returning to service on 28 August 2016. This train is also used to provide additional capacity on regular services during the peak periods.

=== Future developments ===
From the first half of fiscal 2018, a 413 series set will be rebuilt as a tourist train, returning to service on the line in the second half of fiscal 2018.

Five new 521-1000 series two-car sets are scheduled to be introduced over a period of six years, with the first set delivered in December 2017. These sets will replace the ageing 413 series EMUs.

== History ==
The company was founded on 24 July 2012. The company name "Ainokaze Toyama Railway" was announced on 30 May 2013. Ainokaze refers to a north-easterly breeze that blows in the region in spring and summer, and is mentioned in the Man'yōshū collection of Japanese poetry.

The company was formally granted a railway operating license by the Ministry of Land, Infrastructure, Transport and Tourism on 28 February 2014.

== Future developments ==
New stations are planned to be built between Takaoka and Nishi-Takaoka, and between Toyama and Higashi-Toyama.

== See also ==
- List of railway companies in Japan
- List of railway lines in Japan
