= Mizuhashi =

Mizuhashi (written: 水橋 lit. "water bridge") is a Japanese surname. Notable people with the surname include:

- Kaori Mizuhashi (水橋 かおり; born 1974), Japanese voice actress
- Kenji Mizuhashi (水橋 研二; born 1975), Japanese actor
- Mai Mizuhashi (水橋 舞; born 1992), Japanese singer

== Fictional characters ==
- Parsee Mizuhashi, a fictional character in Subterranean Animism from the video game franchise Touhou Project

== See also ==
- Mizuhashi Station, a railway station in Toyama, Toyama Prefecture, Japan
