= Nyūzen Station =

Railway station in Nyūzen, Toyama Prefecture, Japan

Nyūzen Station 入善駅
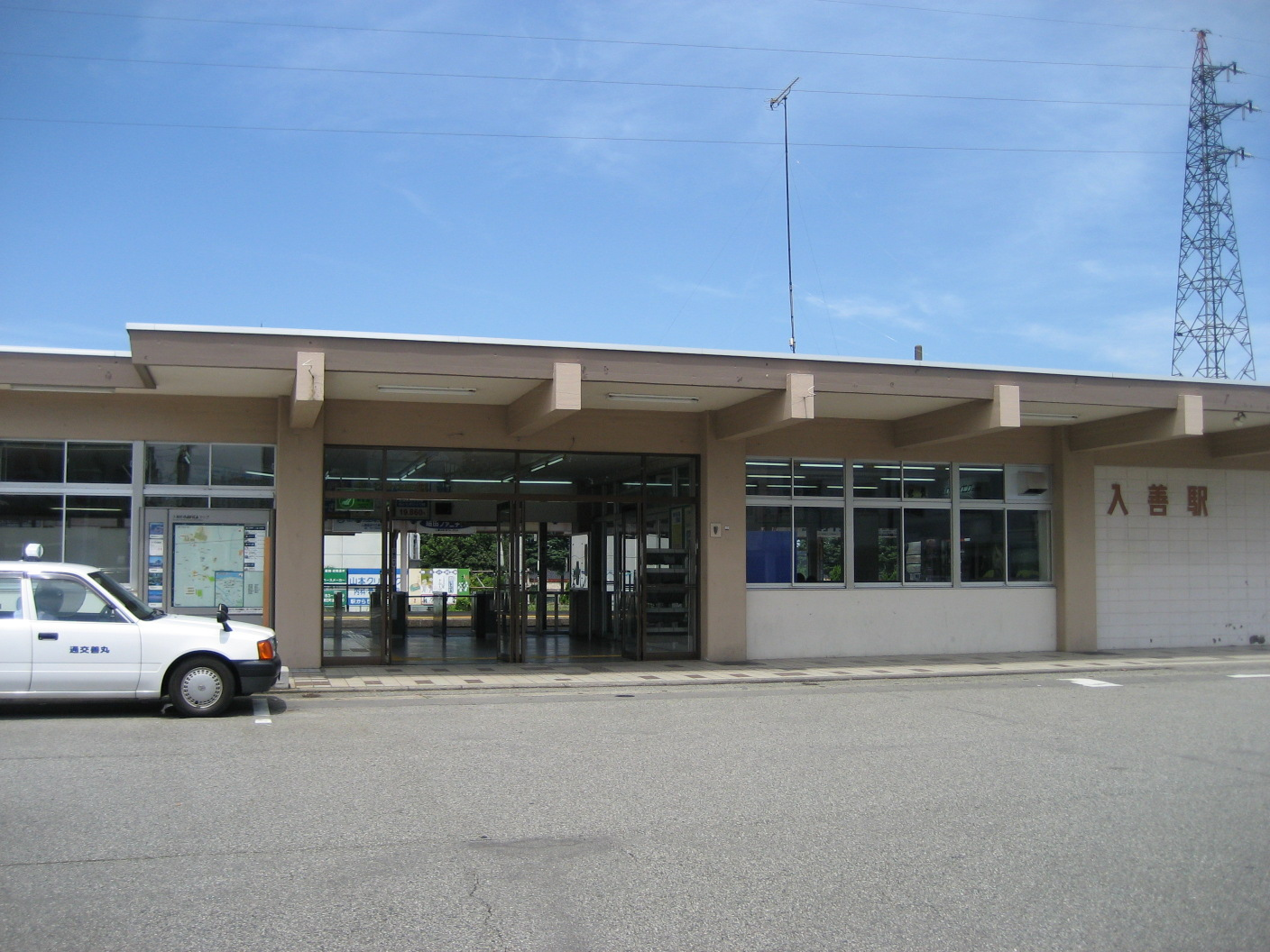
- Nyūzen Station exterior in August 2007

General information
- Location: 6987 Irizen, Nyūzen-machi, Shimoniikawa-gun, Toyama-ken 939-0626; Japan
- Coordinates: 36.9413°N 137.4990°E
- Operator: Ainokaze Toyama Railway
- Line: ■ Ainokaze Toyama Railway Line
- Distance: 85.5 km from Kurikara
- Platforms: 2 side platforms
- Tracks: 2

Other information
- Status: Staffed
- Website: Official website

History
- Opened: 16 April 1910

Passengers
- FY2015: 865 daily
Location
- Location within Japan

Nyūzen Station (入善駅, Nyūzen-eki) is a railway station on the Ainokaze Toyama Railway Line in the town of Nyūzen, Toyama, Japan, operated by the third-sector railway operator Ainokaze Toyama Railway.

== Lines ==
Nyūzen Station is served by the Ainokaze Toyama Railway Line and is 85.5 kilometres from the starting point of the line at Kurikara.

== Station layout ==
Nyūzen Station has two opposed ground-level side platforms connected by a footbridge. The station is staffed.

=== Platforms ===
1	■ Ainokaze Toyama Railway Line	for Toyama and Kanazawa
2	■ Ainokaze Toyama Railway Line	for Tomari and Itoigawa

== History ==
Nyūzen Station was opened on 16 April 1910. From 14 March 2015, with the opening of the Hokuriku Shinkansen extension from Nagano to Kanazawa, local passenger operations over sections of the former Hokuriku Main Line running roughly parallel to the new shinkansen line were reassigned to different third-sector railway operating companies. From this date, Nyūzen Station was transferred to the ownership of the third-sector operating company Ainokaze Toyama Railway.

== Adjacent stations ==
«	Service	»
Ainokaze Toyama Railway Line
Nishi-Nyūzen	Local	Tomari

== Passenger statistics ==
In fiscal 2015, the station was used by an average of 865 passengers daily (boarding passengers only).

== Surrounding area ==
- Nyūzen Post Office

== See also ==
- List of railway stations in Japan
