= Isurugi Station =

Railway station in Oyabe, Toyama Prefecture, Japan

Isurugi Station 石動駅
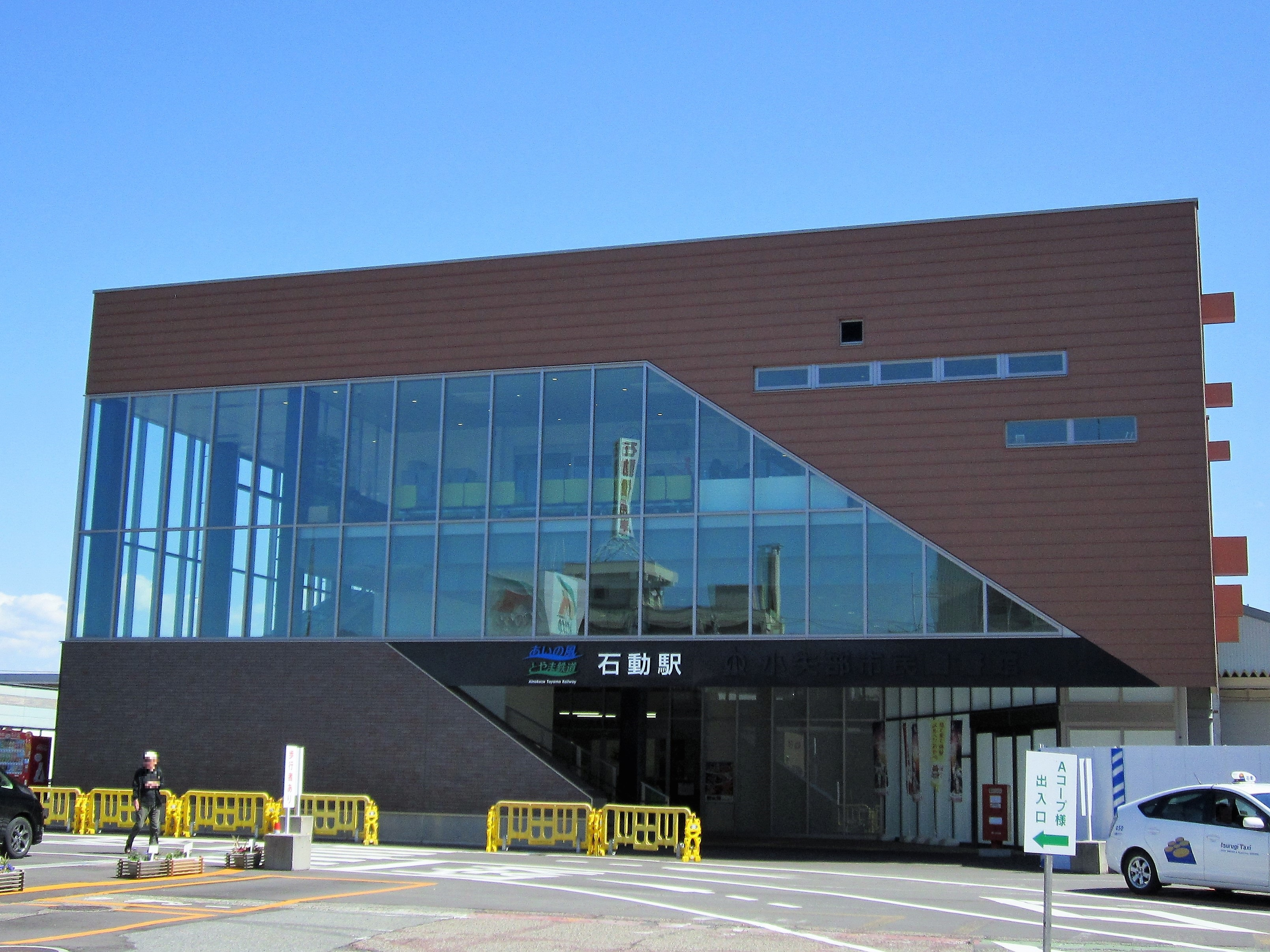
- Isurugi Station in May 2019

General information
- Location: 11-10 Isurugi-cho, Oyabe-shi, Toyama-ken 932-0053; Japan
- Coordinates: 36°40′21.32″N 136°51′55.52″E
- Operator: Ainokaze Toyama Railway
- Line: ■ Ainokaze Toyama Railway Line
- Distance: 6.8 km from Kurikara
- Platforms: 1 side + 1 island platforms
- Tracks: 3

Other information
- Status: Staffed
- Website: Official website

History
- Opened: 1 November 1898

Passengers
- FY2015: 1,652
Location
- Location within Japan

Isurugi Station (石動駅, Isurugi-eki) is a railway station on the Ainokaze Toyama Railway Line in the city of Oyabe, Toyama Prefecture, Japan, operated by the third-sector railway operator Ainokaze Toyama Railway.

== Lines ==
Isurugi Station is served by the Ainokaze Toyama Railway Line and is 6.8 kilometres from the starting point of the line at Kurikara.

== Station layout ==
Isurugi Station has one side platform and one island platform connected by a footbridge.

=== Platforms ===
1	■ Ainokaze Toyama Railway Line	for Takaoka and Toyama
2	■ Ainokaze Toyama Railway Line	for Kanazawa

== History ==
Isurugi Station opened on 1 November 1898 as a station on the Japanese Government Railway (JGR). It was privatized on 1 April 1984, becoming a station on JR West.

From 14 March 2015, with the opening of the Hokuriku Shinkansen extension from Nagano to Kanazawa, local passenger operations over sections of the Hokuriku Main Line running roughly parallel to the new shinkansen line were reassigned to different third-sector railway operating companies. From this date, Isurugi Station was transferred to the ownership of the third-sector operating company Ainokaze Toyama Railway.

== Adjacent stations ==
«	Service	»
Ainokaze Toyama Railway Line
Kanazawa	Ainokaze Liner	Takaoka
Kurikara	Local	Fukuoka

== Passenger statistics ==
In fiscal 2015, the station was used by an average of 1,652 passengers daily (boarding passengers only).

== Surrounding area ==
- National Route 471
- Mitsui Outlet Park, Hokuriku Oyabe

== See also ==
- List of railway stations in Japan
