= Nyūzen =

Nyūzen 入善町
- Town
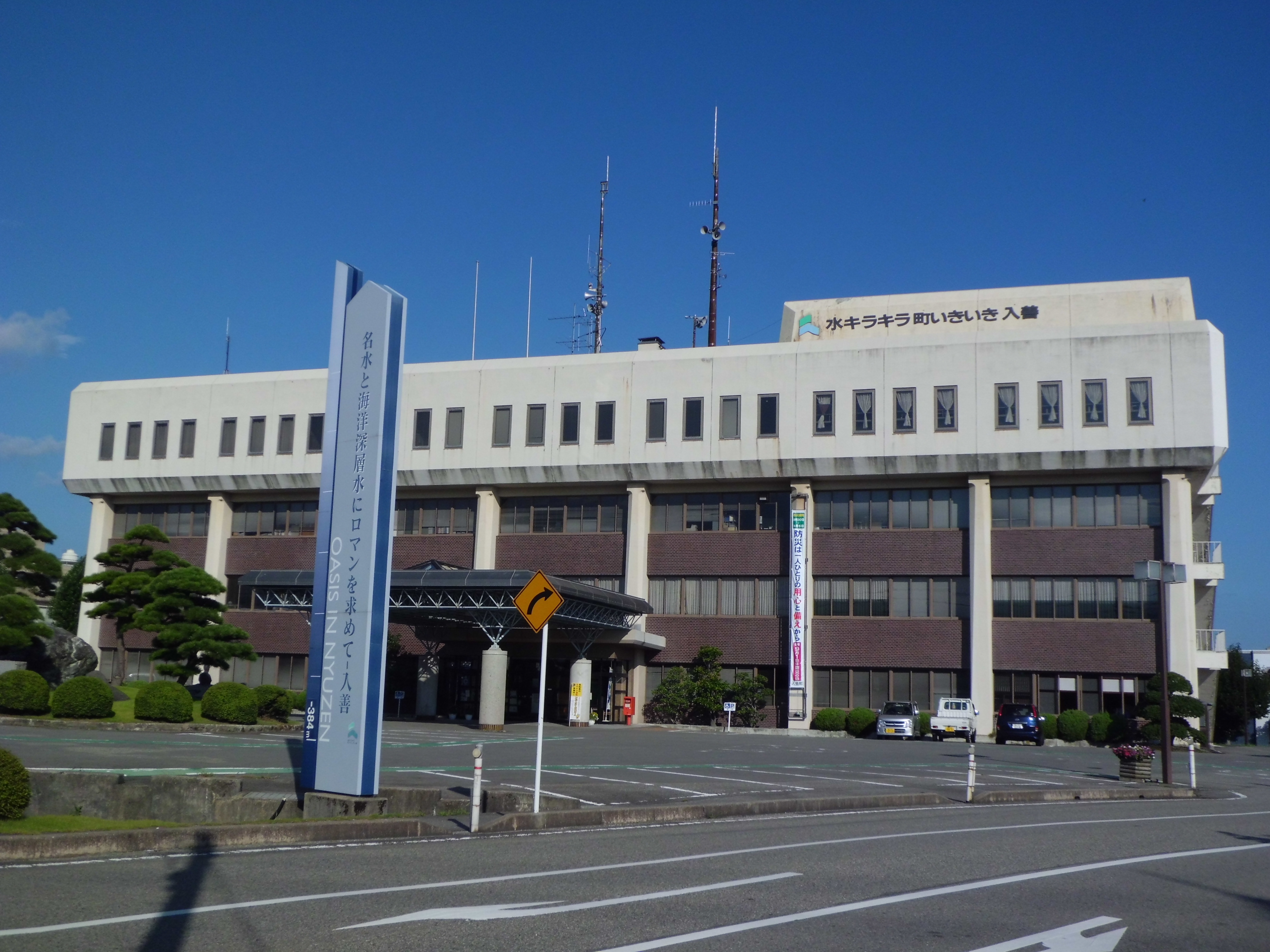
- Nyūzen Town Hall

- Flag Seal

- Location of Nyūzen in Toyama Prefecture

- Coordinates: 36°56′0.7″N 137°30′7.4″E
- Country: Japan
- Region: Chūbu (Hokuriku)
- Prefecture: Toyama
- District: Shimoniikawa

Government
  - Mayor: Haruhito Sasajima

Area
  - Total: 71.25 km^{2} (27.51 sq mi)

Population (October 1, 2020)
  - Total: 23,875
  - Density: 335.1/km^{2} (868/sq mi)
- Time zone: UTC+09:00 (JST)
- Postal code: 939-0693
- Symbols
  - Flower: Tulip
- Phone number: 0765-72-1100
- Address: 3255 Nyūzen, Nyūzen-machi, Shimoniikawa-gun, Toyama-ken
- Website: Official website

Nyūzen (入善町, Nyūzen-machi) is a town in Shimoniikawa District, Toyama Prefecture, Japan. As of 1 May 2018, the town had an estimated population of 25,007 in 8,970 households and a population density of 350 persons per km^{2}. The total area of the town was 71.25 square kilometres (27.51 sq mi).

== Geography ==
With the Sea of Japan to the north, and Kurobe River to the west, Nyūzen is in the center of an alluvial fan. The town is known for its jumbo watermelons, as well as its tulips which became the official town flower in 1983.

Groundwater bubbles forth from various manmade and natural springs in the town. Of special interest is a flat area near the coast the name of which translates to: The Japanese Swamp Cedars of Sugisawa (杉沢の沢スギ, Sugisawa no Sawasugi) where a large volume of flowing spring water has created a rare ecosystem that is protected as a natural monument.

=== Surrounding municipalities ===
- Toyama Prefecture
  - Asahi
  - Kurobe

=== Climate ===
The town has a humid subtropical climate (Köppen Cfa) characterized by hot summers and cold winters with heavy snowfall. The average annual temperature in Nyūzen is 13.6 °C. The average annual rainfall is 2,225 mm with September as the wettest month. The temperatures are highest on average in August, at around 26.3 °C, and lowest in January, at around 2.5 °C.

== Demographics ==
Per Japanese census data, the population of Nyūzen has declined in recent decades.

Historical population
Year	Pop.	±%
1970	27,638	—
1980	29,163	+5.5%
1990	29,625	+1.6%
2000	28,276	−4.6%
2010	27,182	−3.9%
2020	23,839	−12.3%

== History ==
The area of present-day Nyūzen was part of ancient Etchū Province. The area was organised as part of Shimoniikawa District, Toyama after the Meiji restoration. The town of Nyūzen was created with merger of seven villages in Shimoniikawa District on October 1, 1953.

== Education ==
Nyūzen has six public elementary schools and two public middle schools operated by the town government, and one public high school operated by the Toyama Prefectural Board of Education.

== Transport ==
=== Rail ===
- Ainokaze Toyama Railway Line
  - Nishi-Nyūzen - Nyūzen

=== Highway ===
- Hokuriku Expressway

National Route 8

== Sister cities ==
- Forest Grove, Oregon, United States, since 1989
- Hami City, Xinjiang, China, friendship city since June 5, 1997

== Local attractions ==
- Jōbenoma Site, ruins of a Heian period shōen, a National Historic Site.
