= Tomari Station (Toyama) =

Railway station in Asahi, Toyama Prefecture, Japan

Tomari Station 泊駅
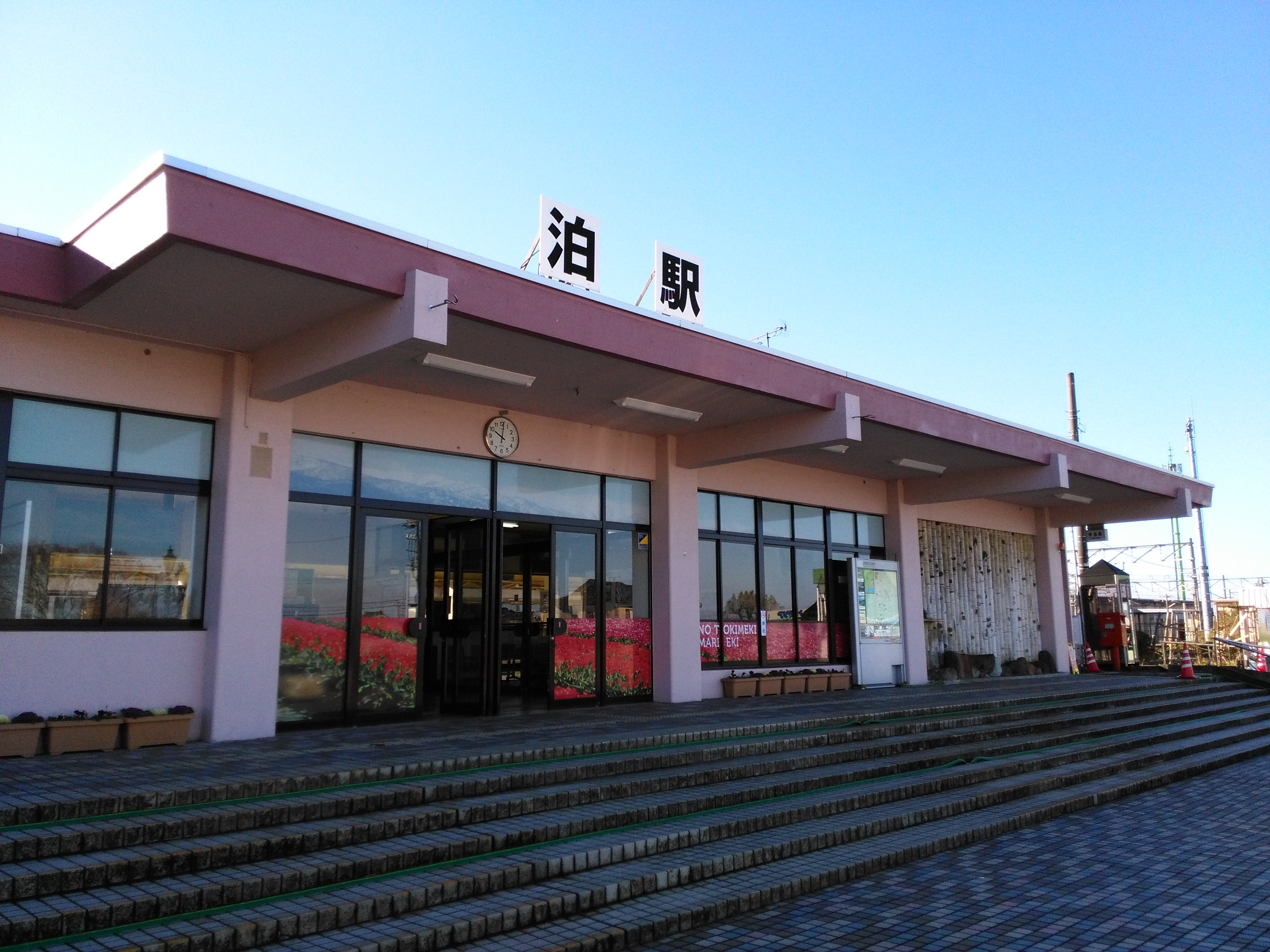
- Tomari Station exterior in December 2015

General information
- Location: 631 Kawahara, Hiranayagi, Asahi-machi, Shimoniikawa-gun, Toyama-ken 939-0744; Japan
- Coordinates: 36°57′07″N 137°33′21″E
- Operator: Ainokaze Toyama Railway
- Line: ■ Ainokaze Toyama Railway Line
- Distance: 90.7 km from Kurikara
- Platforms: 1 side + 1 island platform
- Tracks: 3
- Train operators: Ainokaze Toyama Railway; Echigo Tokimeki Railway

Other information
- Status: Staffed
- Website: Official website

History
- Opened: 16 April 1910

Passengers
- FY2015: 711 daily
Location
- Location within Japan

Tomari Station (泊駅, Tomari-eki) is a railway station on the Ainokaze Toyama Railway Line in Asahi, Toyama, Japan, operated by the third-sector railway operator Ainokaze Toyama Railway.

== Lines ==
Tomari Station is served by the Ainokaze Toyama Railway Line and is 95.4 kilometres from the starting point of the line at Kurikara. Many through services from the neighbouring Echigo Tokimeki Railway Nihonkai Hisui Line terminate at Tomari, with both Echigo Tokimeki Railway trains and Ainokaze Toyama Railway trains using Platform 2 to provide a same-platform transfer.

== Station layout ==
Tomari Station has one side platform and one island platform connected by a footbridge. The station is staffed.

=== Platforms ===
| 1 | ■ Echigo Tokimeki Railway Nihonkai Hisui Line | for Ichiburi and Itoigawa |
| 2 | ■ Echigo Tokimeki Railway Nihonkai Hisui Line | for Itoigawa and Naoetsu |
| 3 | ■ Ainokaze Toyama Railway Line | for Uozu, Toyama and Kanazawa |

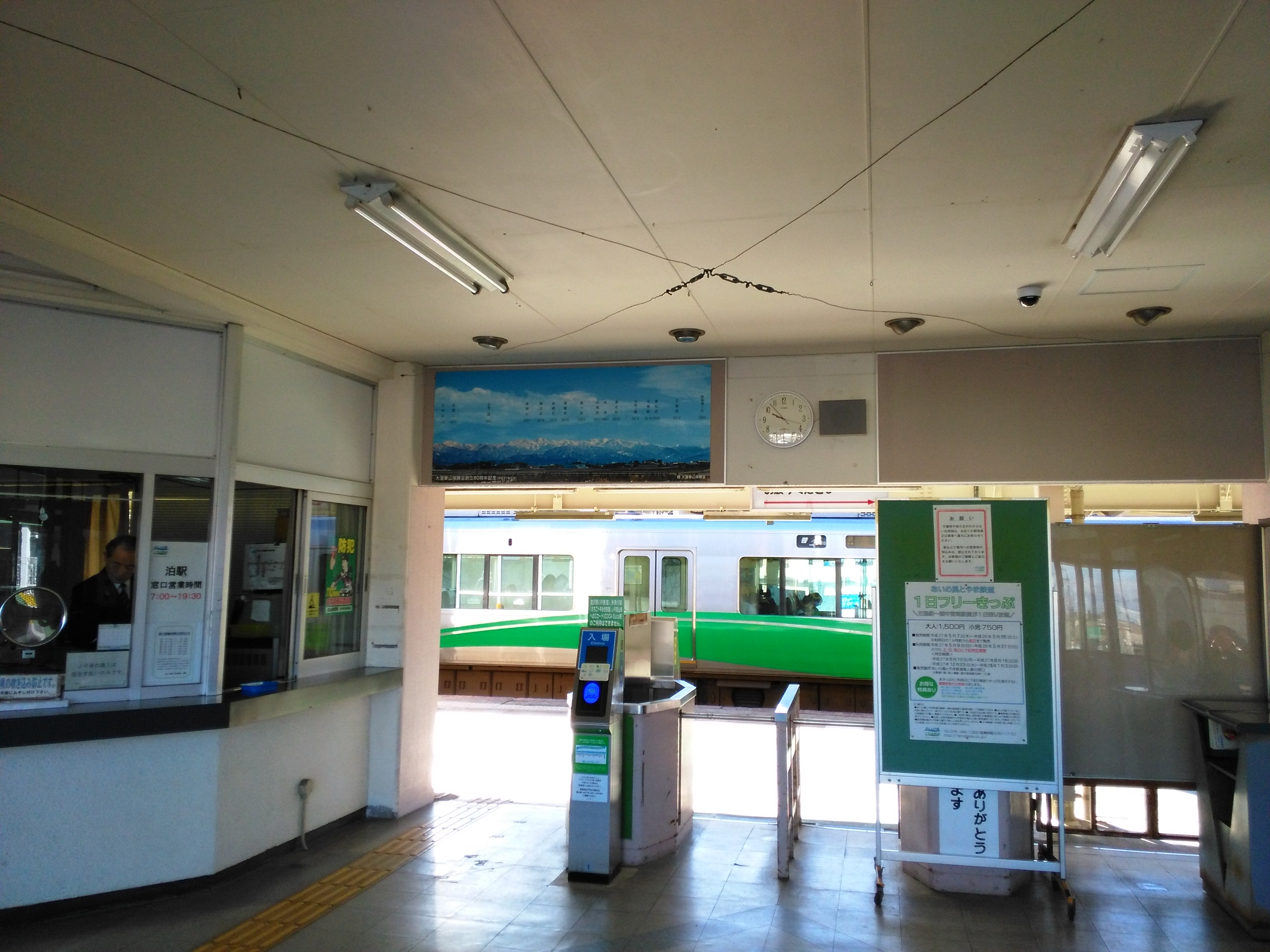
The entrance to the platforms in December 2015

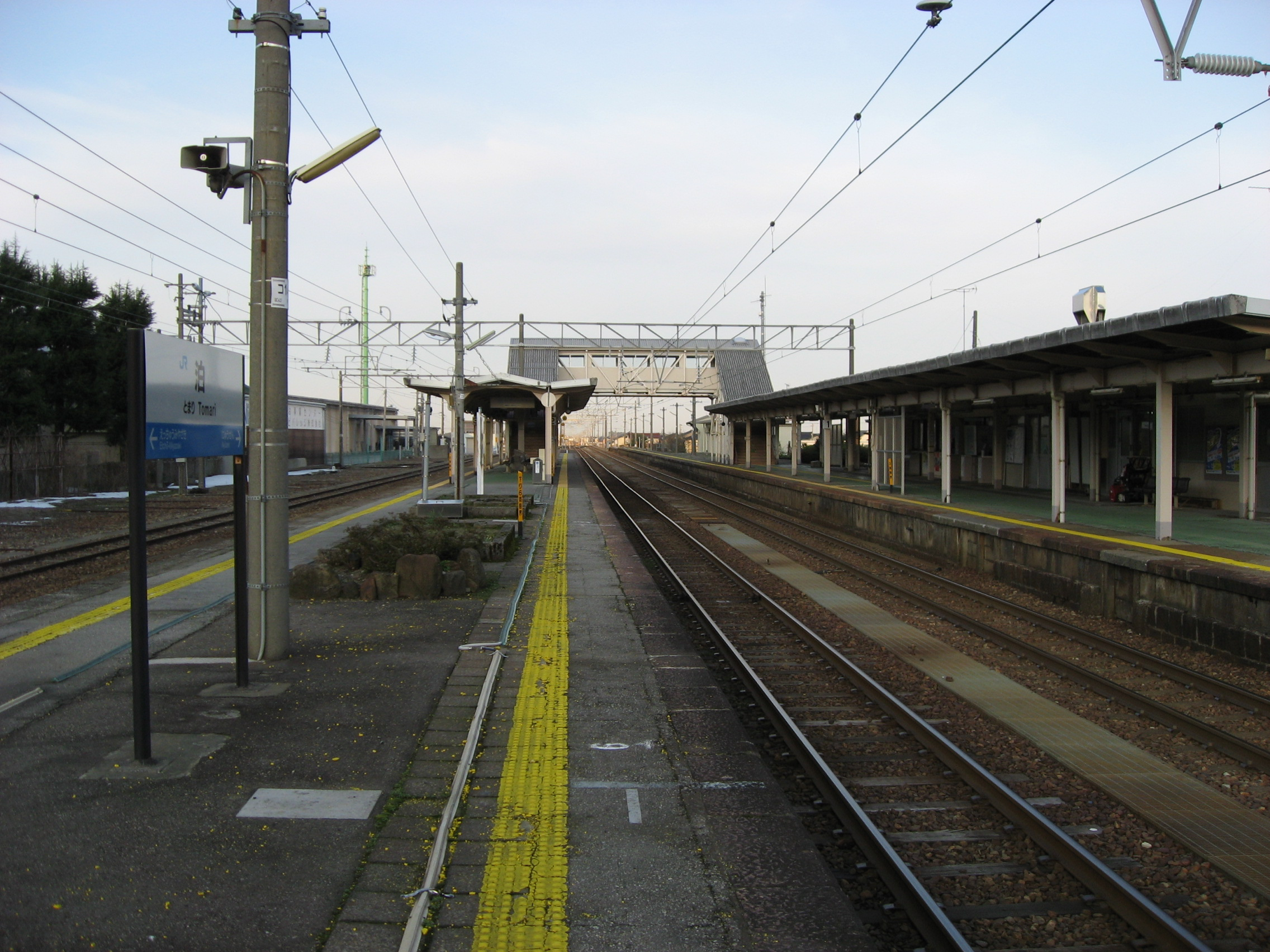
The station platforms in February 2010

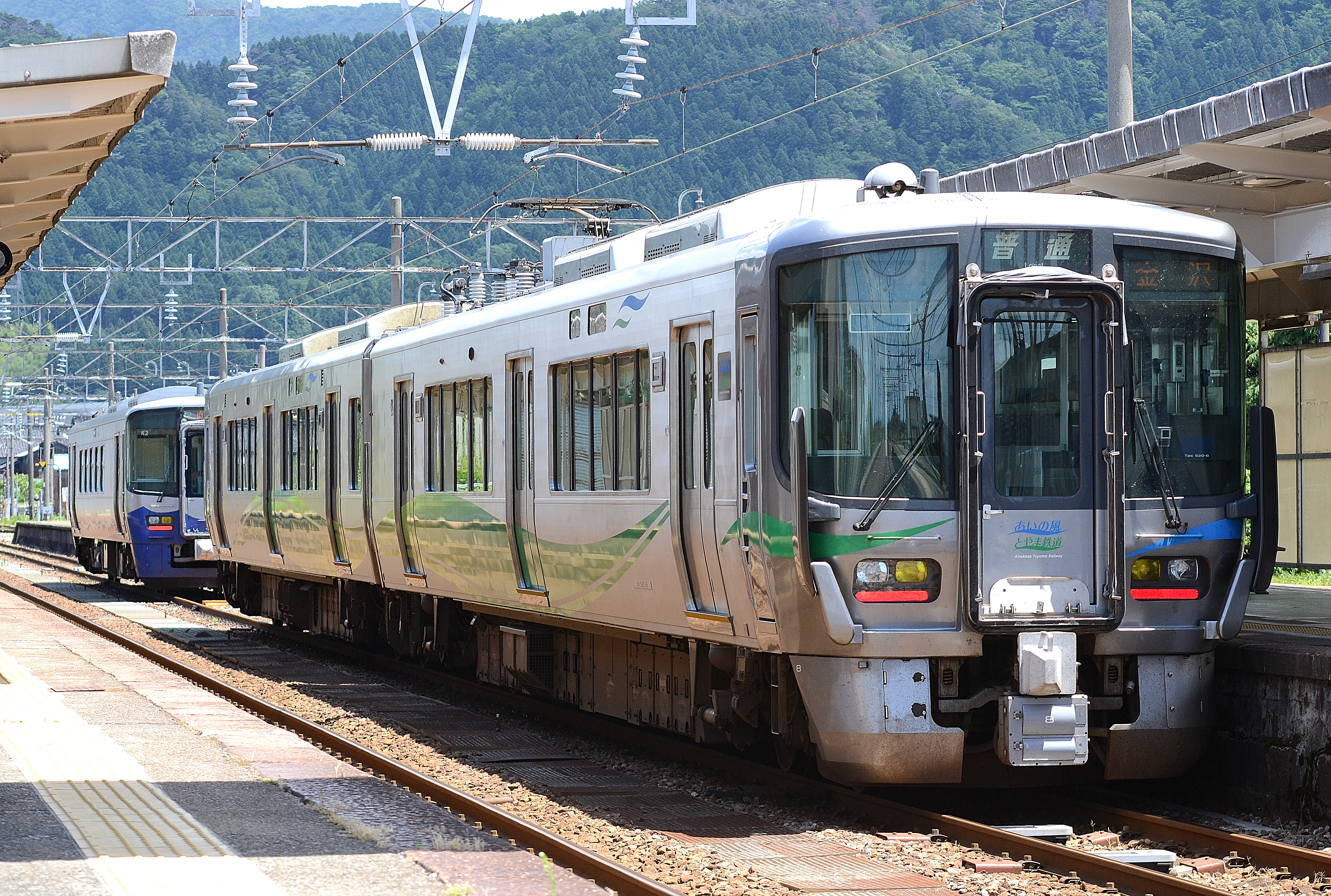
An Ainokaze Toyama Railway 521 series EMU and an Echigo Tokimeki Railway ET122 diesel unit at Tomari Station in June 2015

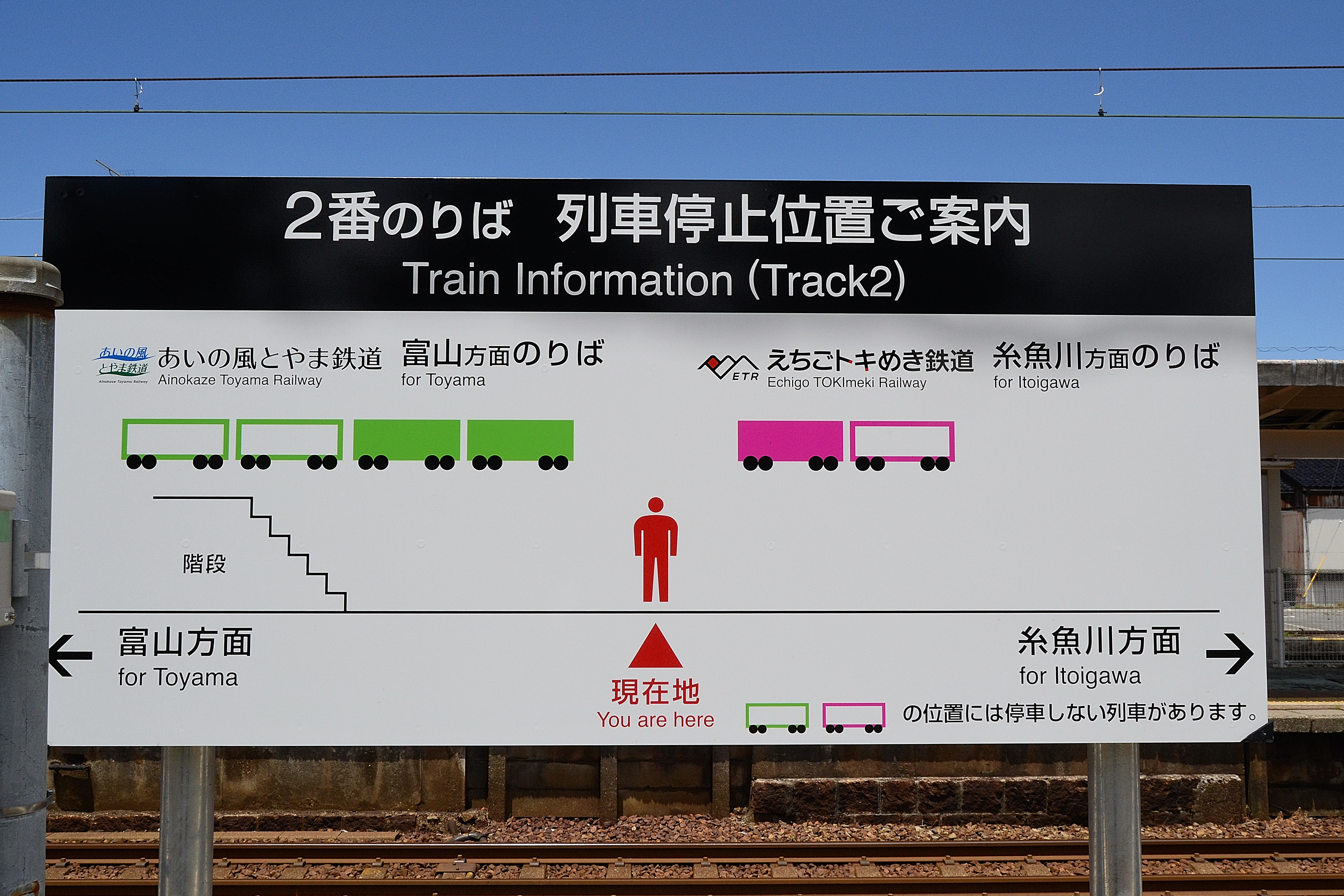
A passenger information sign on platform 2 indicating the locations for boarding Ainokaze Toyama Railway and Echigo Tokimeki Railway trains

== History ==
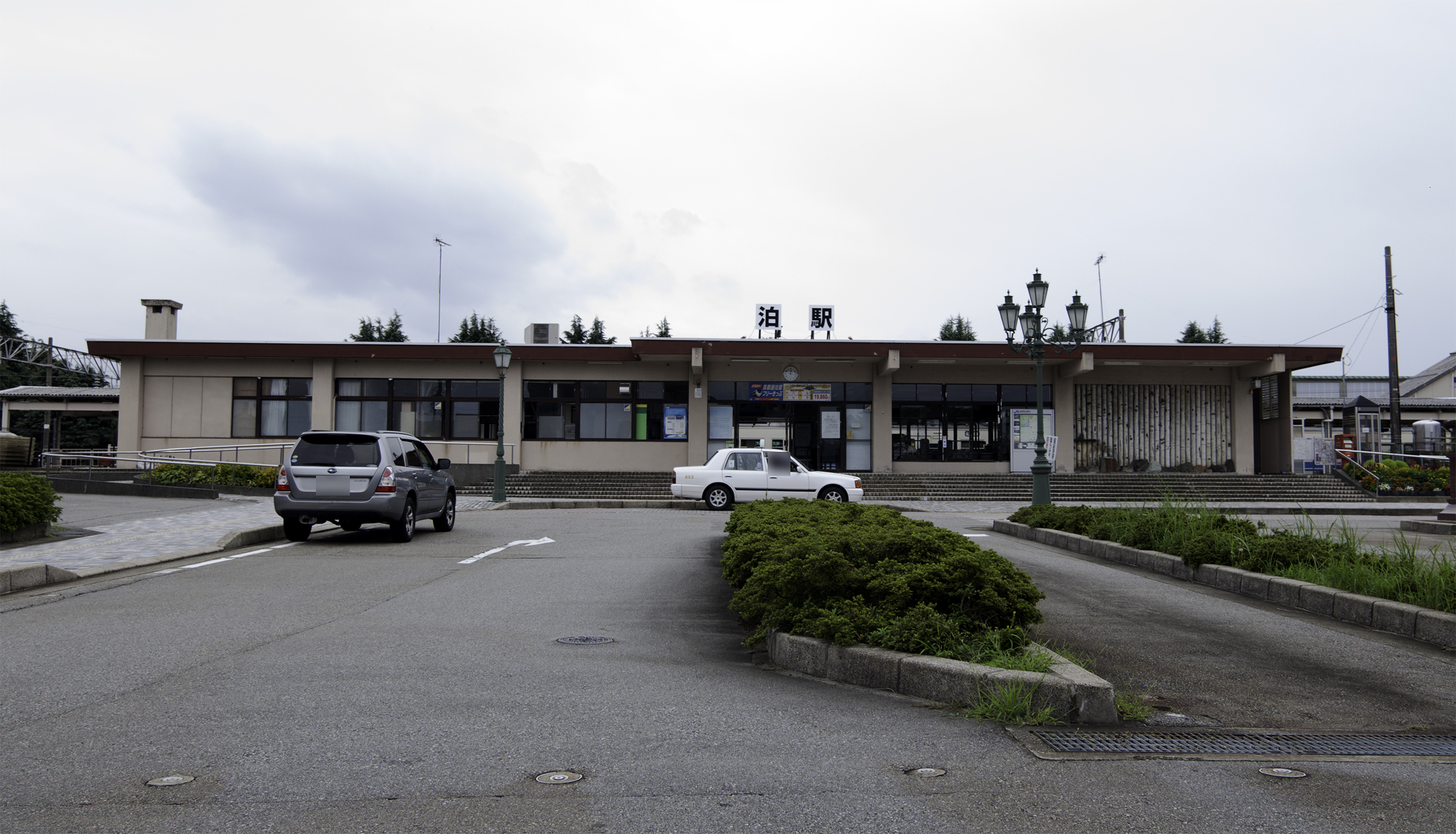
The station in JR West days in September 2011

The station opened on 16 April 1910. With the privatization of Japanese National Railways (JNR) on 1 April 1987, the station came under the control of JR West.

From 14 March 2015, with the opening of the Hokuriku Shinkansen extension from Nagano to Kanazawa, local passenger operations over sections of the Hokuriku Main Line running roughly parallel to the new shinkansen line were reassigned to different third-sector railway operating companies. From this date, Tomari Station was transferred to the ownership of the Ainokaze Toyama Railway.

== Adjacent stations ==
| « | Service | » |
Ainokaze Toyama Railway Line
| Nyūzen | Local | Etchū-Miyazaki |

== Passenger statistics ==
In fiscal 2015, the station was used by an average of 711 passengers daily (boarding passengers only).

== Surrounding area ==
- National Route 8
- Asahi Town Hall
- Tomari Post Office

== See also ==
- List of railway stations in Japan
