= Uozu Station =

Railway station in Uozu, Toyama Prefecture, Japan

Uozu Station 魚津駅
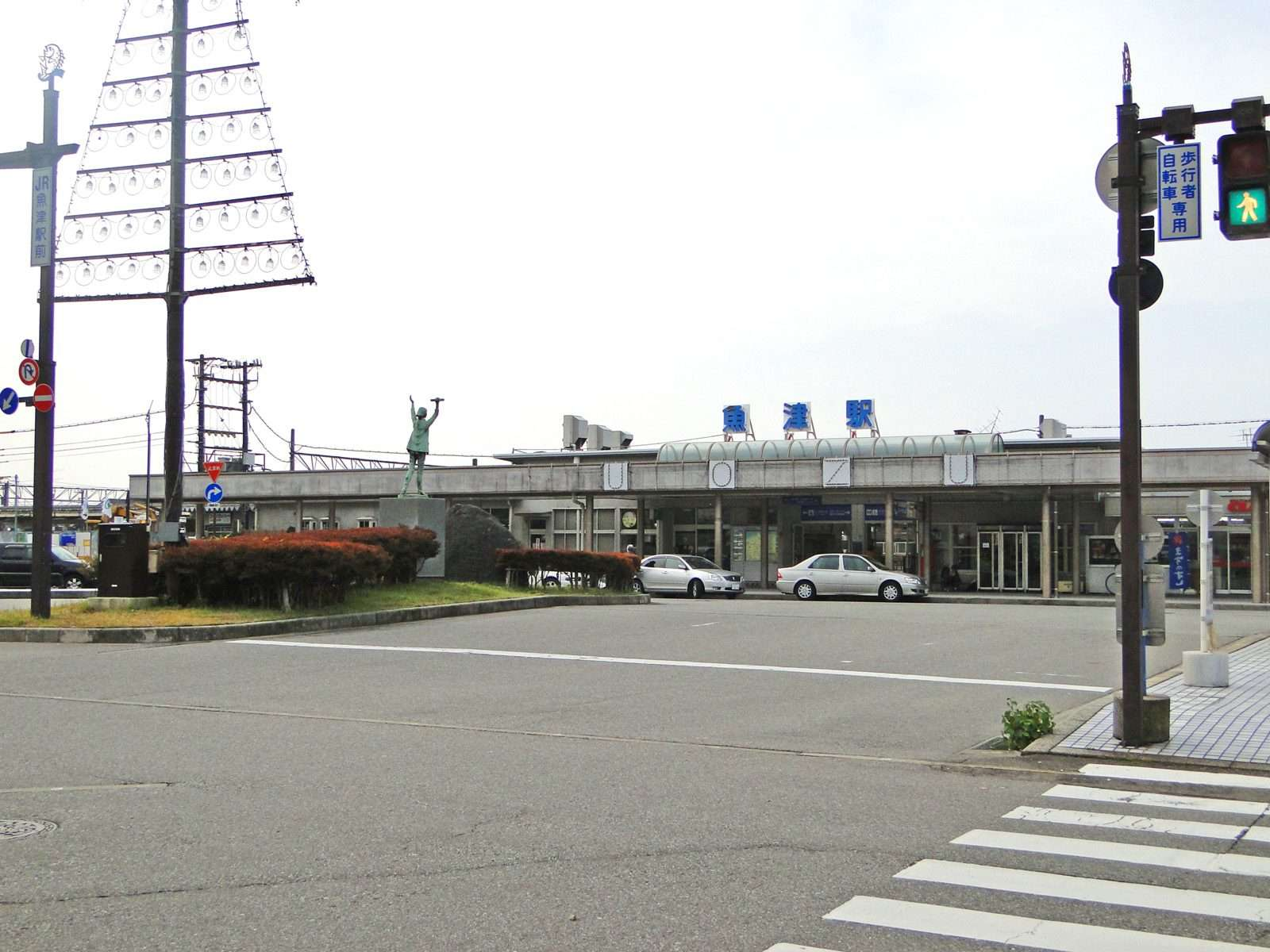
- Uozu Station in November 2010

General information
- Location: 1-1 Shakado, Uozu-shi, Toyama-ken 937-0067; Japan
- Coordinates: 36.8266386°N 137.40592°E
- Operator: Ainokaze Toyama Railway; JR Freight
- Line: ■ Ainokaze Toyama Railway Line
- Distance: 67.1 km from Kurikara
- Platforms: 1 side +1 island platforms
- Tracks: 3
- Connections: Shin-Uozu Station

Other information
- Status: Staffed
- Website: Official website

History
- Opened: 16 November 1908

Passengers
- FY2015: 2,142 daily
Location
- Location within Japan

Uozu Station (魚津駅, Uozu-eki) is a railway station on the Ainokaze Toyama Railway Line in the city of Uozu, Toyama, Japan, operated by the third-sector railway operator Ainokaze Toyama Railway. It is also a freight terminal for the Japan Freight Railway Company.

== Lines ==
Uozu Station is served by the Ainokaze Toyama Railway Line and is 67.1 kilometers from the starting point of the line at Kurikara.

== Station layout ==
Uozu Station has one ground-level side platform and one ground-level island platform connected by a footbridge. The station is staffed.

=== Platforms ===
1	■ Ainokaze Toyama Railway Line	for Toyama and Kanazawa
2, 3	■ Ainokaze Toyama Railway Line	for Tomari and Itoigawa

== Adjacent stations ==
«	Service	»
Ainokaze Toyama Railway Line
Higashi-Namerikawa	Local	Kurobe

== History ==
Uozu Station opened on 16 November 1908. With the privatization of Japanese National Railways (JNR) on 1 April 1987, the station came under the control of JR West.

From 14 March 2015, with the opening of the Hokuriku Shinkansen extension from Nagano to Kanazawa, local passenger operations over sections of the former Hokuriku Main Line running roughly parallel to the new shinkansen line were reassigned to different third-sector railway operating companies. From this date, Uozu Station was transferred to the ownership of the third-sector operating company Ainokaze Toyama Railway.

== Passenger statistics ==
In fiscal 2015, the station was used by an average of 2,142 passengers daily (boarding passengers only).

== Surrounding area ==
- Shin-Uozu Station
- Kurobe Public Hospital

== See also ==
- List of railway stations in Japan
