= Kurikara Station =

Railway station in Tsubata, Ishikawa Prefecture, Japan

Kurikara Station 倶利伽羅駅
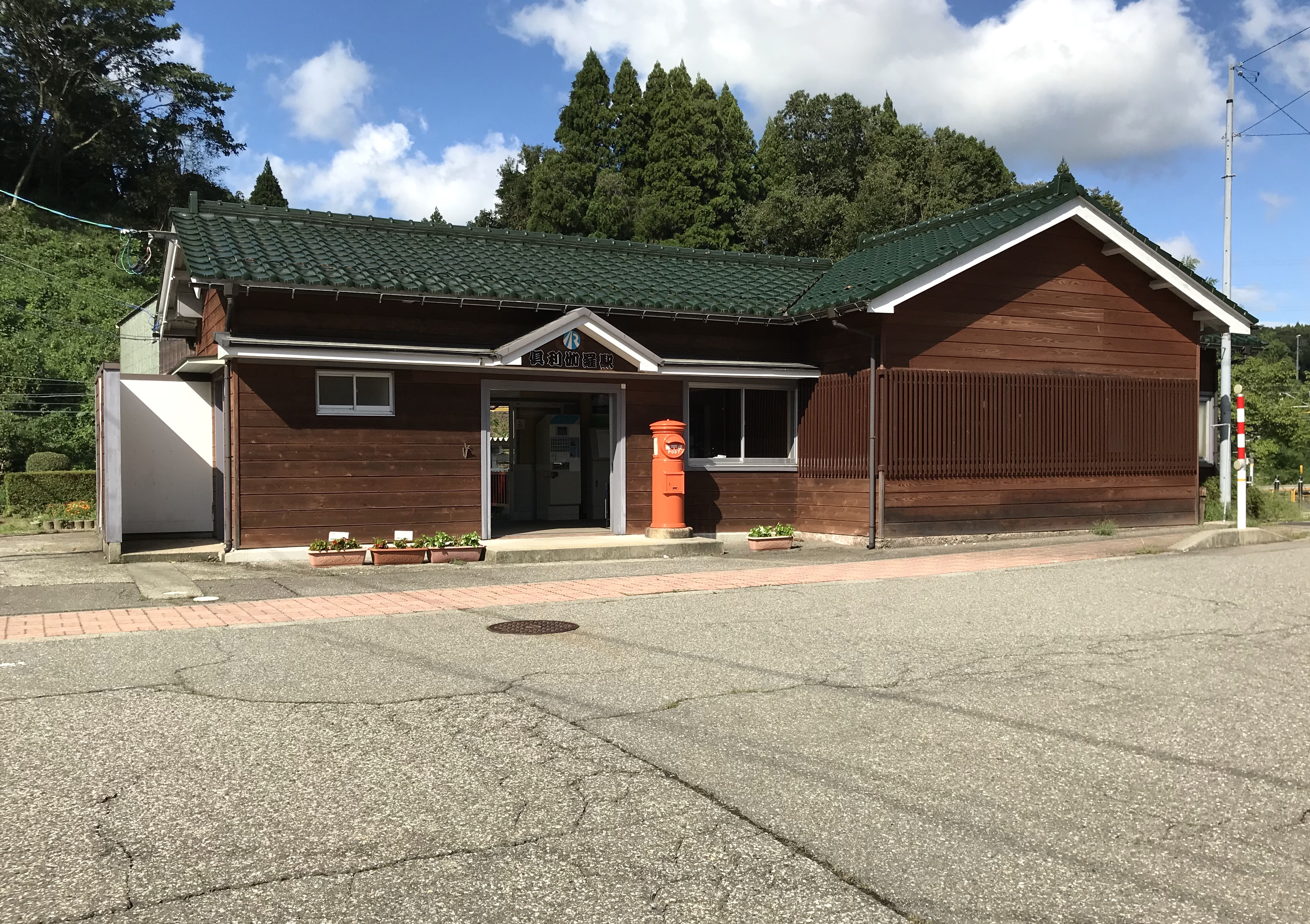
- Kurikara Station in September 2018

General information
- Location: 150 Kariyasu, Tsubata-machi, Kahoku-gun, Ishikawa-ken 929-0416; Japan
- Coordinates: 36.6726°N 136.7914°E
- Operator: IR Ishikawa Railway; Ainokaze Toyama Railway
- Lines: ■ IR Ishikawa Railway Line; ■ Ainokaze Toyama Railway Line
- Distance: 17.8 km from Kanazawa
- Platforms: 1 island platform
- Tracks: 2

Other information
- Status: Staffed
- Website: Official website

History
- Opened: 15 June 1909

Passengers
- FY2015: 225
Location
- Location within Japan

Kurikara Station (倶利伽羅駅, Kurikara-eki) is a railway station in the town of Tsubata, Kahoku District, Ishikawa, Japan, jointly operated by the third-sector railway operator IR Ishikawa Railway and the Ainokaze Toyama Railway.

== Lines ==
Kurikara Station is the eastern terminal of the IR Ishikawa Railway Line from Daishōji, and is also the western terminal station for the Ainokaze Toyama Railway Line to Ichiburi. The station is 194.4 kilometers from Maibara.

== Layout ==
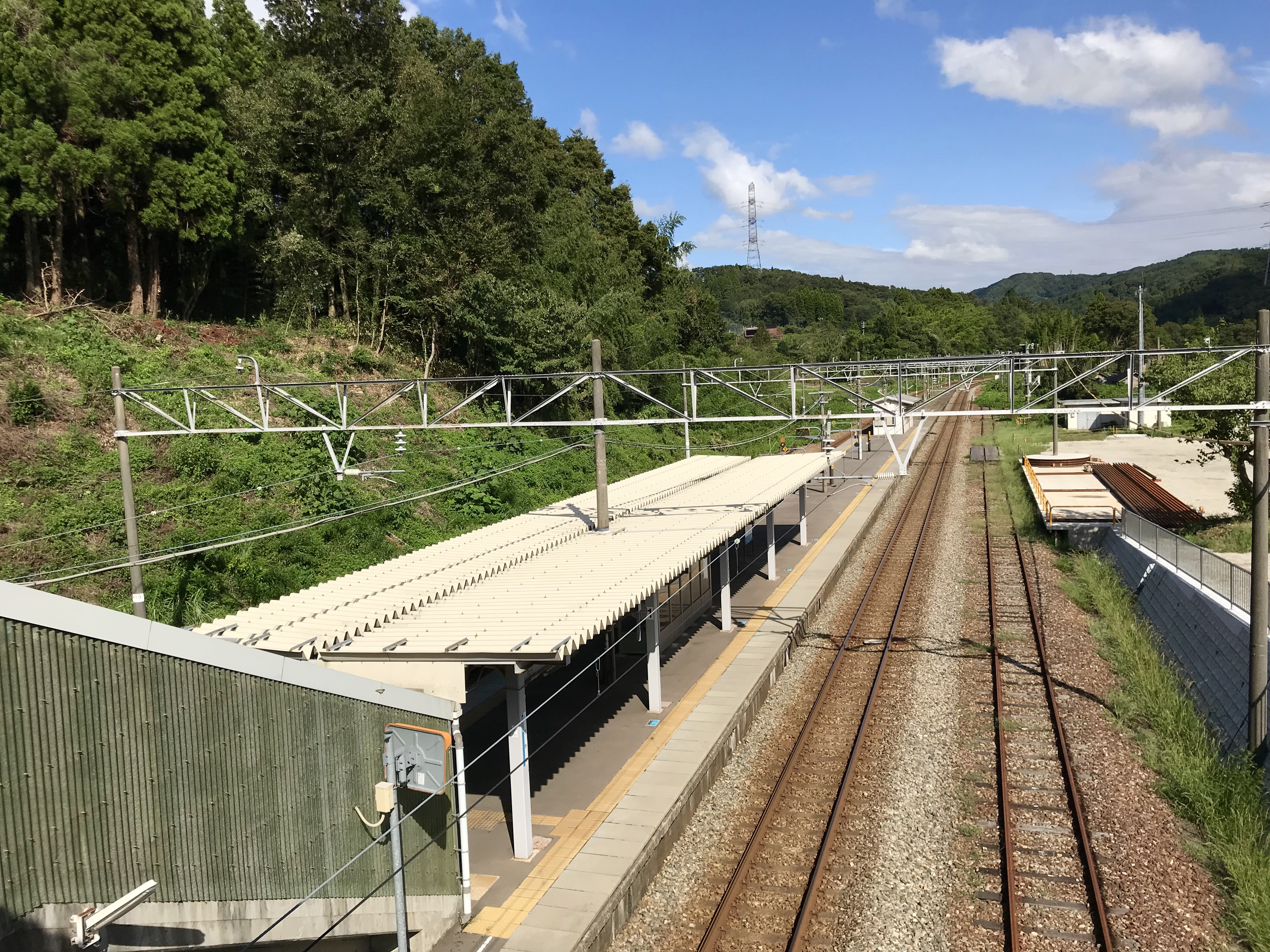
platform

The station has an island platform serving two tracks. The platform is connected to the station building on the south side by a footbridge. The station is unattended.

=== Platforms ===
1	■ IR Ishikawa Railway Line	for Kanazawa
2	■ Ainokaze Toyama Railway Line	for Takaoka and Toyama

== Adjacent stations ==
«	Service	»
IR Ishikawa Railway Line
Ainokaze Liner: Does not stop at this station
Tsubata	Local	Isurugi

== History ==
Kurikara Station opened on 15 June 1909. With the privatization of JNR on 1 April 1987, the station came under the control of JR West.

From 14 March 2015, with the opening of the Hokuriku Shinkansen extension from Nagano to Kanazawa, local passenger operations over sections of the Hokuriku Main Line running roughly parallel to the new shinkansen line were reassigned to different third-sector railway operating companies. From this date, Kurikara Station became a boundary station between the Ainokaze Toyama Railway Line of Toyama Prefecture to the west and the IR Ishikawa Railway Line of Ishikawa Prefecture to the east.

== Surrounding area ==
- Kariyasu Elementary School

== See also ==
- List of railway stations in Japan
