= Nishi-Uozu Station =

Railway station in Uozu, Toyama Prefecture, Japan

Nishi-Uozu Station 西魚津駅
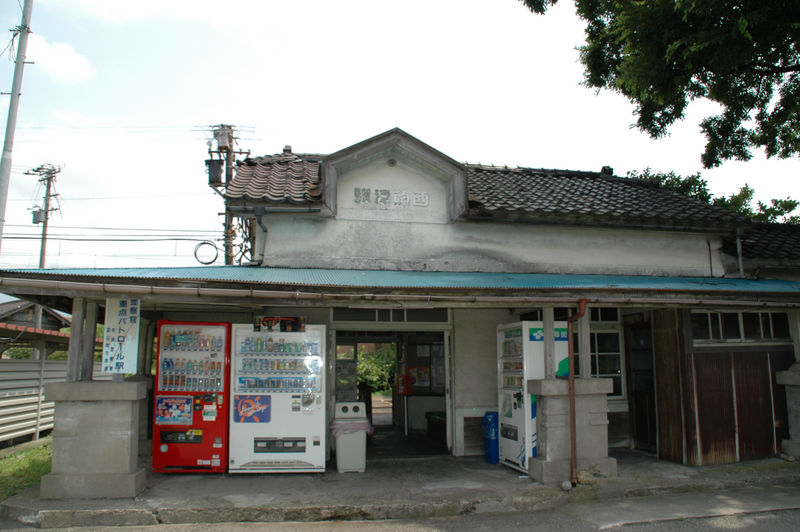
- Nishi-Uozu Station in July 2005

General information
- Location: 3363-7 Sumiyoshi, Uozu-shi, Toyama-ken 937-0851; Japan
- Coordinates: 36.8040°N 137.3947°E
- Operator: Toyama Chihō Railway
- Line: ■ Toyama Chihō Railway Main Line
- Distance: 27.6 from Dentetsu-Toyama
- Platforms: 2 side platforms
- Tracks: 2

Other information
- Status: Unstaffed
- Website: Official website

History
- Opened: 5 June 1936
Location
- Location within Japan

Nishi-Uozu Station (西魚津駅, Nishi-Uozu-eki) is a railway station in the city of Uozu, Toyama, Japan, operated by the private railway operator Toyama Chihō Railway.

== Lines ==
Nishi-Uozu Station is served by the Toyama Chihō Railway Main Line, and is 27.6 kilometers from the starting point of the line at Dentetsu-Toyama.

== Station layout ==
The station has two opposed ground-level side platforms connected to the wooden station building by a level crossing. The station is unattended.

== History ==
Nishi-Uozu Station was opened on 5 June 1936.

== Adjacent stations ==
«	Service	»
Toyama Chihō Railway Main Line
Limited Express: Does not stop at this station
Hayatsukikazumi	Rapid Express	Dentetsu-Uozu
Hayatsukikazumi	Express	Dentetsu-Uozu
Etchū-Nakamura	Local	Dentetsu-Uozu

== Surrounding area ==
- Uozu Aquarium
- Sumiyoshi Elementary School

== See also ==
- List of railway stations in Japan
