= Uozu =

Uozu 魚津市
- City
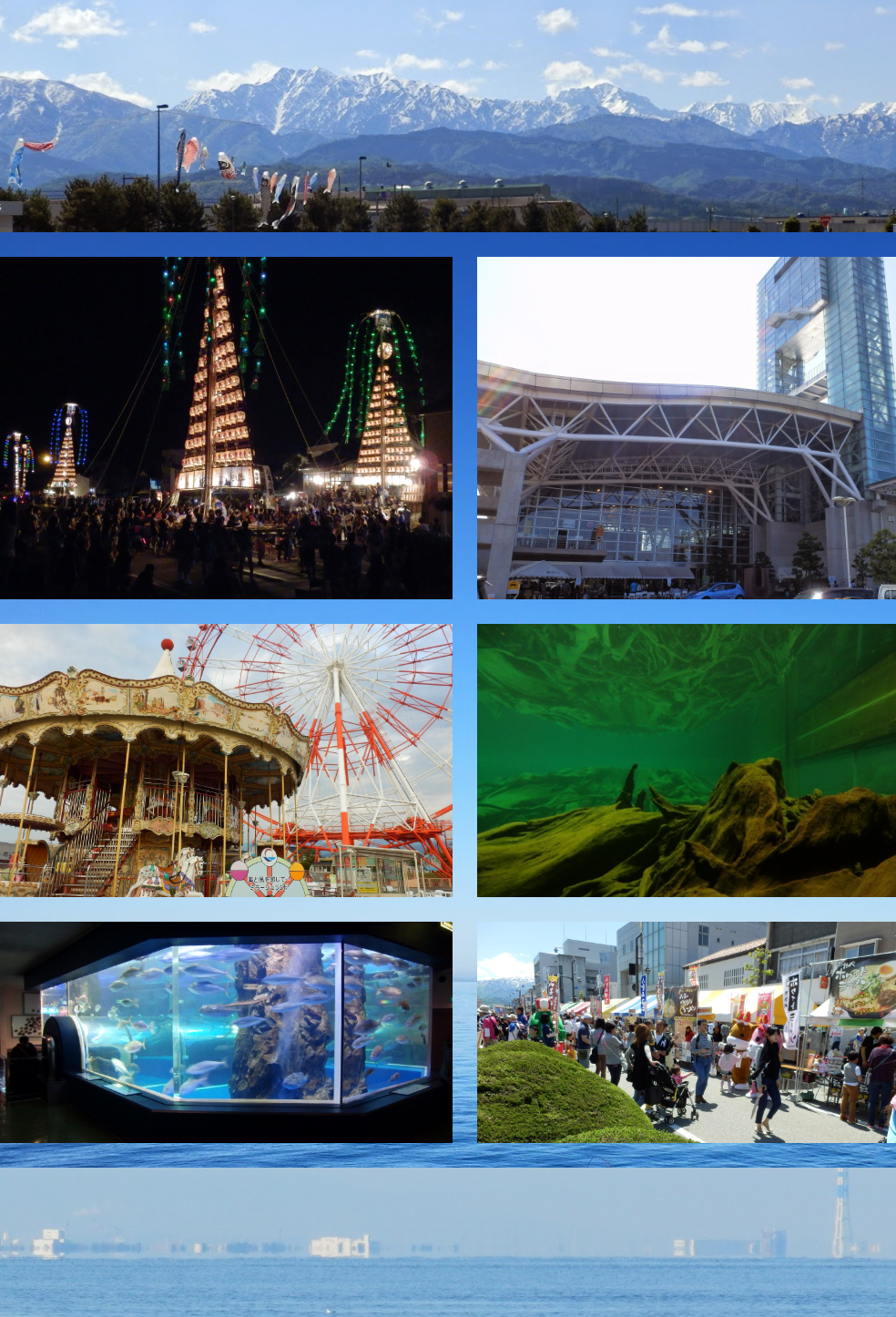
- Top-Tateyama Mountains; 1st row: Tatemon Festival, Ariso Dome; 2nd row:Mirage Land, Buried Forest; 3rd row:Uozu Aquarium, Uozu Station bottom:Mirage

- Flag Seal

- Location of Uozu in Toyama Prefecture

- Coordinates: 36°49′38.3″N 137°24′33″E
- Country: Japan
- Region: Chūbu (Kōshin'etsu)
- Prefecture: Toyama
- First official recorded: 701 AD
- City Settled: April 1, 1952

Area
  - Total: 200.61 km^{2} (77.46 sq mi)

Population (1 March 2016)
  - Total: 42,224
  - Density: 210.48/km^{2} (545.14/sq mi)
- Time zone: UTC+9 (Japan Standard Time)
- Phone number: 0765-23-1067
- Address: 1-10-1 Shakadō, Uozu-shi, Toyama-ken 937-8555
- Climate: Cfa
- Website: www.city.uozu.toyama.jp
- Symbols
- Flower: Lilium speciosum, Azalea
- Tree: Pinus

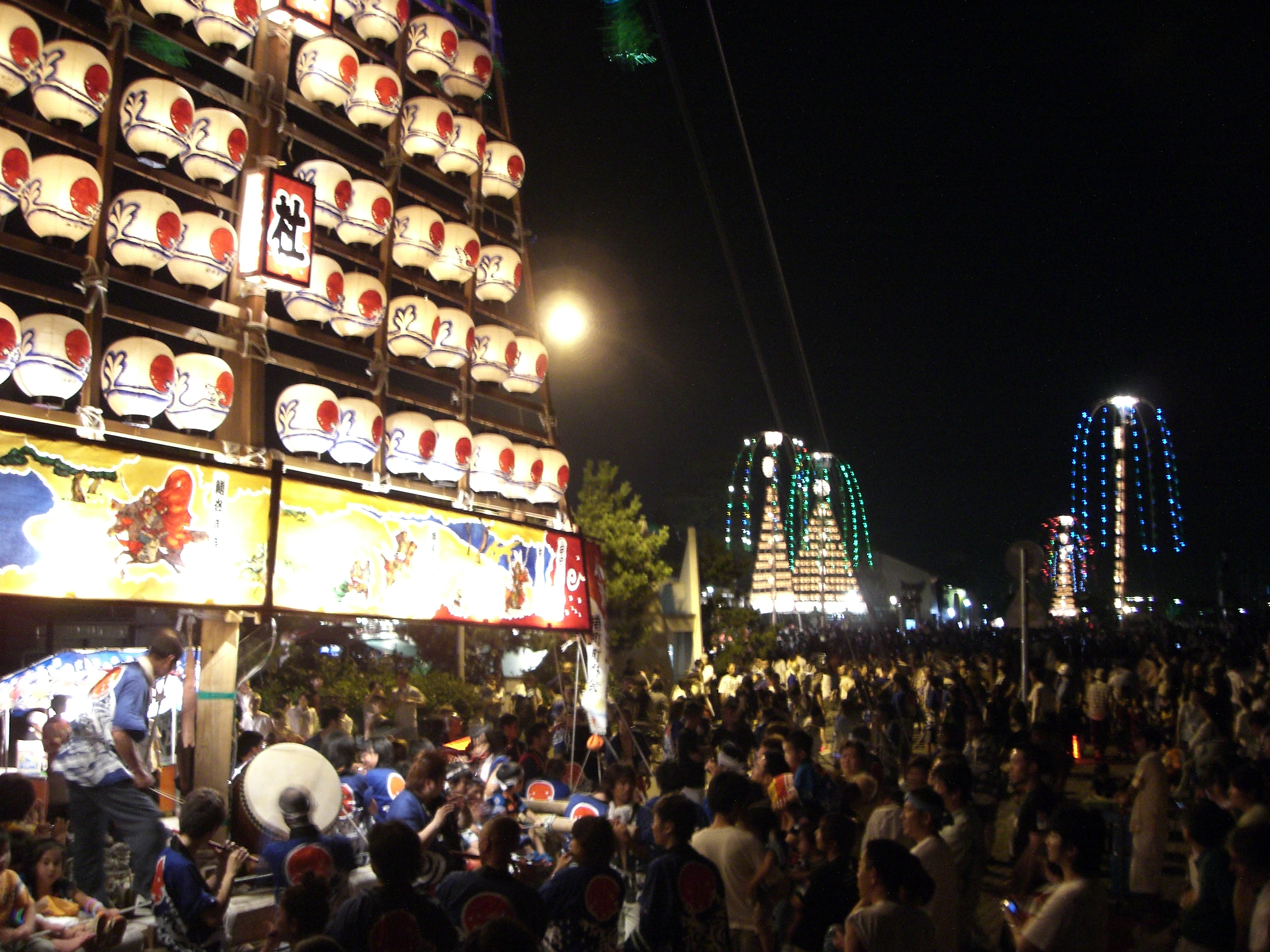
Tatemon Festival, one of the famous festivals in Toyama Prefecture

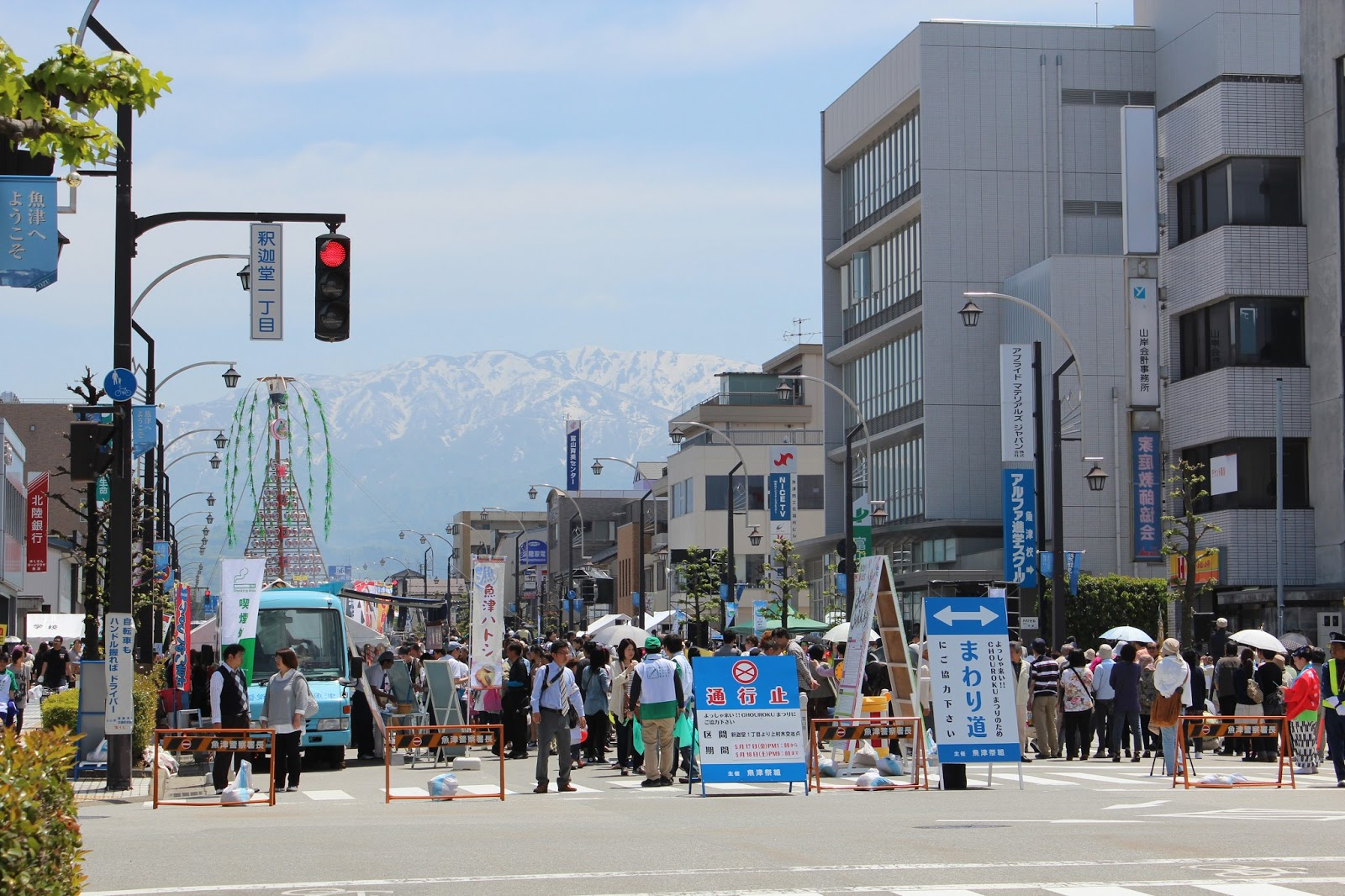
view from Uozu station

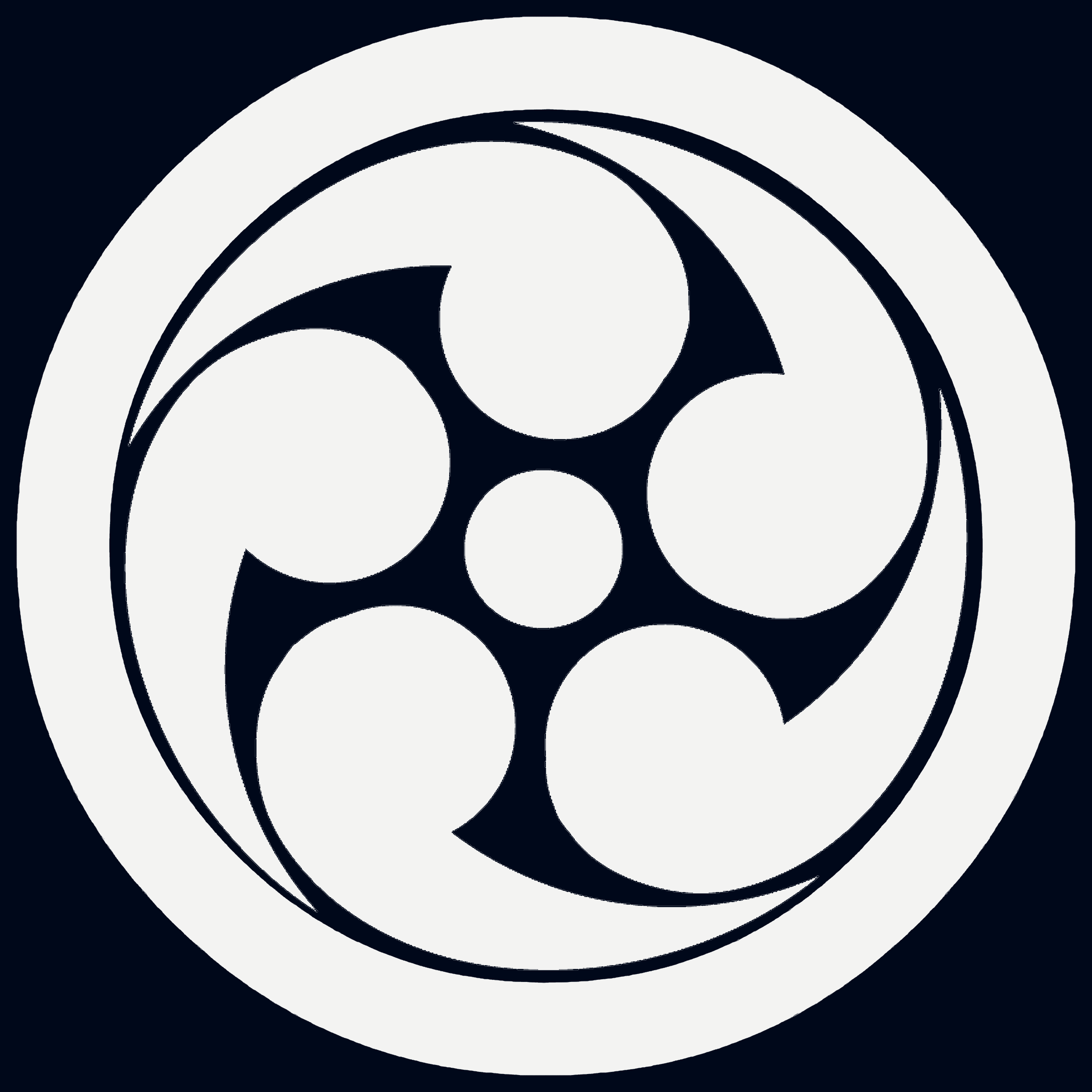
The shrine emblem of Uozu Shrine (Uozu City, Toyama Prefecture).

Uozu (魚津市, Uozu-shi; Japanese pronunciation: [ɯ̈́.ò̞.(d͡)zɨ̀, ɯ̈̀.ó̞.(d͡)zɨ́.ɕì]) is a city in the eastern part of Toyama Prefecture, Japan. As of 1 March 2018, the city had an estimated population of 42,224 in 16,811 households and a population density of 210 persons per km^{2}. Its total area was 200.61 square kilometres (77.46 sq mi).

== Geography ==
Uozu lies in between Namerikawa and Kurobe, stretching from Toyama Bay and the Sea of Japan in the northwest to tall mountain ranges in the southeast. The highest mountains in Uozu are Sougadake and Kekachiyama, and the highest elevation in Uozu is 2,414 m. Several rapid rivers run through Uozu; from east to west, they are the Fuse River, the Katakai River, the Kado River, and the Hayatsuki River. Much of the area is a dispersed settlement typical of this region of Japan.

=== Surrounding municipalities ===
- Toyama Prefecture
  - Kamiichi
  - Kurobe
  - Namerikawa

=== Climate ===
Uozu has a humid subtropical climate (Köppen Cfa) characterized by mild summers and cold winters with heavy snowfall. The average annual temperature in Uozu is 13.7 °C. The average annual rainfall is 2278 mm with September as the wettest month. The temperatures are highest on average in August, at around 26.3 °C, and lowest in January, at around 2.4 °C.

Climate data for Uozu (1991−2020 normals, extremes 1978−present)
Month	Jan	Feb	Mar	Apr	May	Jun	Jul	Aug	Sep	Oct	Nov	Dec	Year
Record high °C (°F)	19.2 (66.6)	22.4 (72.3)	29.1 (84.4)	30.7 (87.3)	32.5 (90.5)	36.3 (97.3)	37.9 (100.2)	37.8 (100.0)	37.5 (99.5)	33.5 (92.3)	29.2 (84.6)	24.9 (76.8)	37.9 (100.2)
Mean daily maximum °C (°F)	6.2 (43.2)	6.8 (44.2)	10.9 (51.6)	16.8 (62.2)	21.9 (71.4)	25.0 (77.0)	29.0 (84.2)	30.6 (87.1)	26.5 (79.7)	21.0 (69.8)	15.3 (59.5)	9.4 (48.9)	18.3 (64.9)
Daily mean °C (°F)	2.7 (36.9)	2.9 (37.2)	6.2 (43.2)	11.7 (53.1)	16.9 (62.4)	20.7 (69.3)	24.7 (76.5)	25.9 (78.6)	21.9 (71.4)	16.4 (61.5)	10.7 (51.3)	5.5 (41.9)	13.9 (56.9)
Mean daily minimum °C (°F)	−0.3 (31.5)	−0.5 (31.1)	1.9 (35.4)	6.8 (44.2)	12.2 (54.0)	16.8 (62.2)	21.2 (70.2)	22.1 (71.8)	18.2 (64.8)	12.3 (54.1)	6.6 (43.9)	2.0 (35.6)	9.9 (49.9)
Record low °C (°F)	−8.8 (16.2)	−9.3 (15.3)	−7.1 (19.2)	−1.8 (28.8)	3.8 (38.8)	8.3 (46.9)	14.3 (57.7)	14.6 (58.3)	10.4 (50.7)	2.8 (37.0)	−1.0 (30.2)	−6.7 (19.9)	−9.3 (15.3)
Average precipitation mm (inches)	254.7 (10.03)	165.5 (6.52)	176.8 (6.96)	161.4 (6.35)	154.0 (6.06)	180.9 (7.12)	276.1 (10.87)	206.9 (8.15)	233.6 (9.20)	203.5 (8.01)	255.1 (10.04)	304.6 (11.99)	2,588.3 (101.90)
Average snowfall cm (inches)	133 (52)	112 (44)	21 (8.3)	2 (0.8)	0 (0)	0 (0)	0 (0)	0 (0)	0 (0)	0 (0)	1 (0.4)	55 (22)	325 (128)
Average precipitation days (≥ 1.0 mm)	23.1	18.9	17.3	13.4	11.9	11.5	13.8	10.8	12.9	13.4	17.5	22.4	186.9
Average snowy days (≥ 3 cm)	11.8	10.9	2.2	0.2	0	0	0	0	0	0	0.1	5.2	30.4
Mean monthly sunshine hours	60.8	87.6	134.0	169.8	195.0	147.5	147.0	201.4	141.0	141.9	99.3	62.8	1,593.5
Source: Japan Meteorological Agency

== Demographics ==
Per Japanese census data, the population of Uozu has declined in recent decades.

Historical population
Year	Pop.	±%
1970	47,124	—
1980	49,512	+5.1%
1990	49,514	+0.0%
2000	47,136	−4.8%
2010	44,959	−4.6%
2020	40,535	−9.8%

== History ==
The area of present-day Uotsu was part of ancient Etchū Province and has been inhabited since at least the Jōmon period. Discovery of gold in the mountains of Uozu around 1394 led to an influx of people, making the area around Matsukura Castle a center for the region. Later, when Matsukura Castle was destroyed, the center was reestablished around Uozu Castle close to the sea. In 1582, the Siege of Uozu occurred between forces allied to the Uesugi clan, and forces under Oda Nobunaga. Uozu Castle was captured by Oda forces only three days before Oda's assassination at the Honnō-ji incident.

Under the Edo period Tokugawa shogunate, Uozu was part of Kaga Domain ruled by the Maeda clan. The modern town of Uozu was established with the establishment of the municipalities system on 1 April 1889. The Taisho rice riots of 1918 began at Uozu before spreading across the country. Most of the western portion of the town was destroyed in a fire in 1943, but the town escaped damage in World War II. Uozu was raised to city status on 1 April 1952. In September 1956, a great fire ravished many buildings in Uozu.

== Government ==
Uozu has a mayor-council form of government with a directly elected mayor and a unicameral city legislature of 18 members.

== Education ==
Uozu has ten public elementary schools and two public junior high schools operated by the town government, and three public high schools operated by the Toyama Prefectural Board of Education. There is also one private high school.

== Transportation ==
Uozu is located 3 hours by rail and 4.5 hours by car from Tokyo. Since March 2015, rail access is possible via Hokuriku Shinkansen high-speed train from nearby rail hub of Toyama. Uozu is served by two passenger train lines, the Toyama Chihō Railway Main Line and the Ainokaze Toyama Railway line, running together from Uozu Station westward and separating eastward.

=== Railway ===
- Ainokaze Toyama Railway
  - Uozu
- Toyama Chihō Railway
  - Nishi-Uozu – Dentetsu-Uozu – Shin-Uozu – Kyōden

=== Highway ===
- Hokuriku Expressway
- National Route 8

== Sister cities ==
- Chiang Mai, Thailand, since 8 August 1989

== Notable people from Uozu, Toyama ==
- Ayumu Ishikawa, Japanese professional baseball pitcher (Chiba Lotte Marines, Nippon Professional Baseball – Pacific League)
- Akihiro Murata, Japanese professional shogi player ranked 6-dan
- Takashi Rakuyama, Japanese former football player
- Kaori Sadohara, Japanese voice actress and singer
- Akira Shoji, Japanese former mixed martial artist and professional wrestler
- Kōsuke Tamura, Japanese professional shogi player ranked 7-dan

== Local attractions ==
=== Uozu's Three Mysteries ===
==== The Buried Forest ====
Approximately 2000 years ago, a primeval sugi (Cryptomeria) forest along the coast was partially buried so that only the trunks were preserved. The area is a National Natural Monument, and there is a museum in Uotsu where examples can be seen.

==== Firefly Squid ====
In the early morning hours, from the end of March to the beginning of June, female firefly squid (ホタルイカ, hotaruika) rise to the surface to spawn. Their name comes from a bluish white glow which emanates from various points on their bodies.

==== Mirages ====
The waters of Toyama Bay are noted for mirages, especially during spring and winter. The spring mirage for which Uozu is famous for may be seen on warm, sunny, windless days from April to June. The Mirage Land Amusement Park (ミラージュランド) with its large Ferris wheel is a popular location for observation of the phenomena.

=== Other ===
Other sightseeing destinations in Uozu include the Uozu Aquarium, Kintaro Hot Springs (金太郎温泉), Ariso Dome Gymnasium, Niikawa Culture Hall, the Uozu Historical Folk Museum, Lake Ikejiri, Hirazawa Waterfalls and site of Matsukura Castle.
