= Namerikawa =

Namerikawa 滑川市
- City
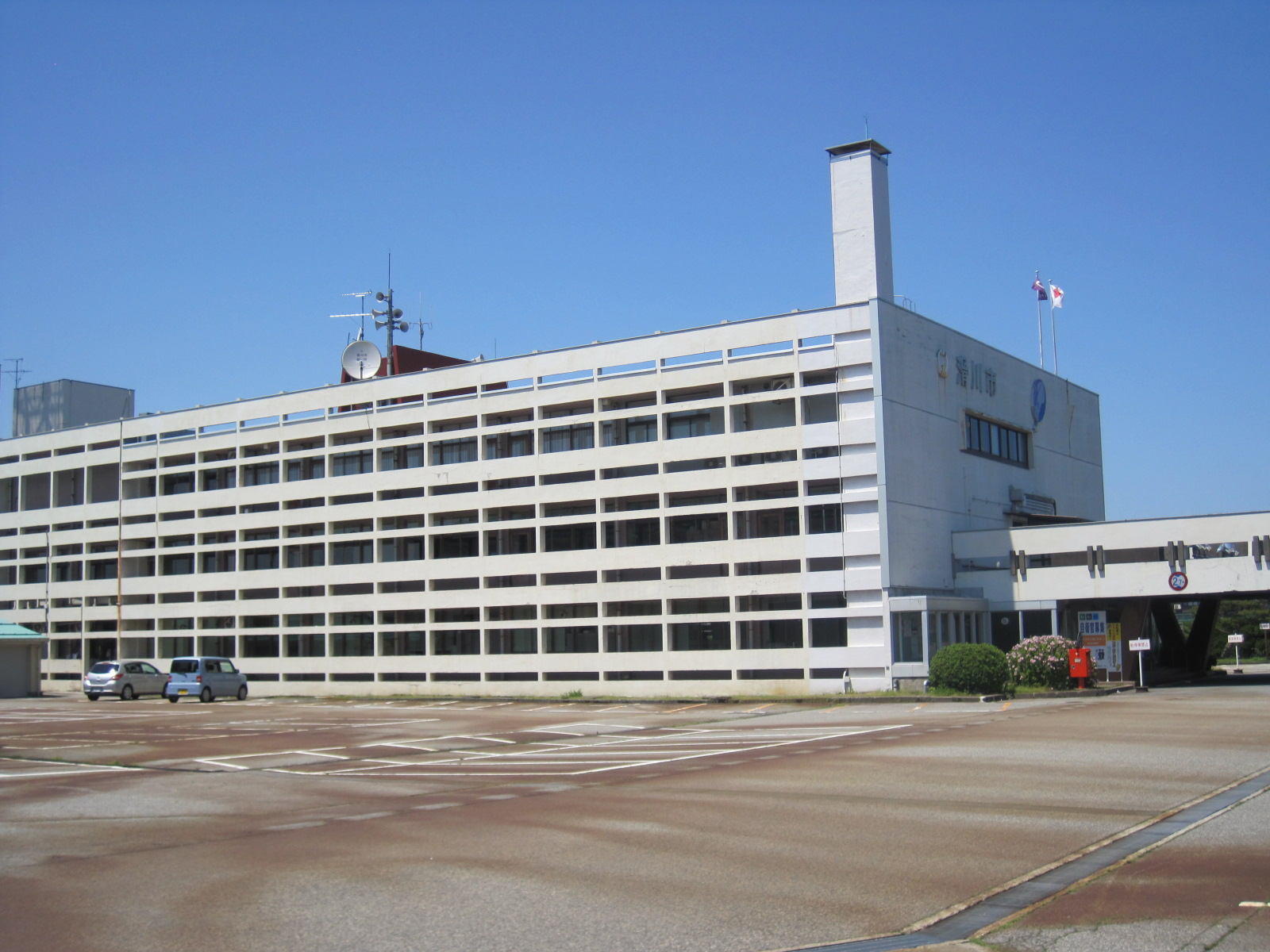
- Namerikawa City Hall

- Flag Seal

- Location of Namerikawa in Toyama Prefecture

- Coordinates: 36°45′51.7″N 137°20′28.2″E
- Country: Japan
- Region: Chūbu (Hokuriku)
- Prefecture: Toyama

Government
  - Mayor: Tetsuo Mizuno (from February 2022)

Area
  - Total: 54.63 km^{2} (21.09 sq mi)

Population (January 1st 2024)
  - Total: 32,728
  - Density: 599.1/km^{2} (1,552/sq mi)
- Time zone: UTC+9 (Japan Standard Time)
- Symbols
  - Tree: Pine
  - Flower: Chrysanthemum morifolium
  - Flowering Tree: Rhododendron
  - Fish: Firefly squid
- Phone number: 076-475-2111
- Address: Jikei-machi 104, Namerikawa-shi, Toyama-ken 936-8601
- Website: www.city.namerikawa.toyama.jp

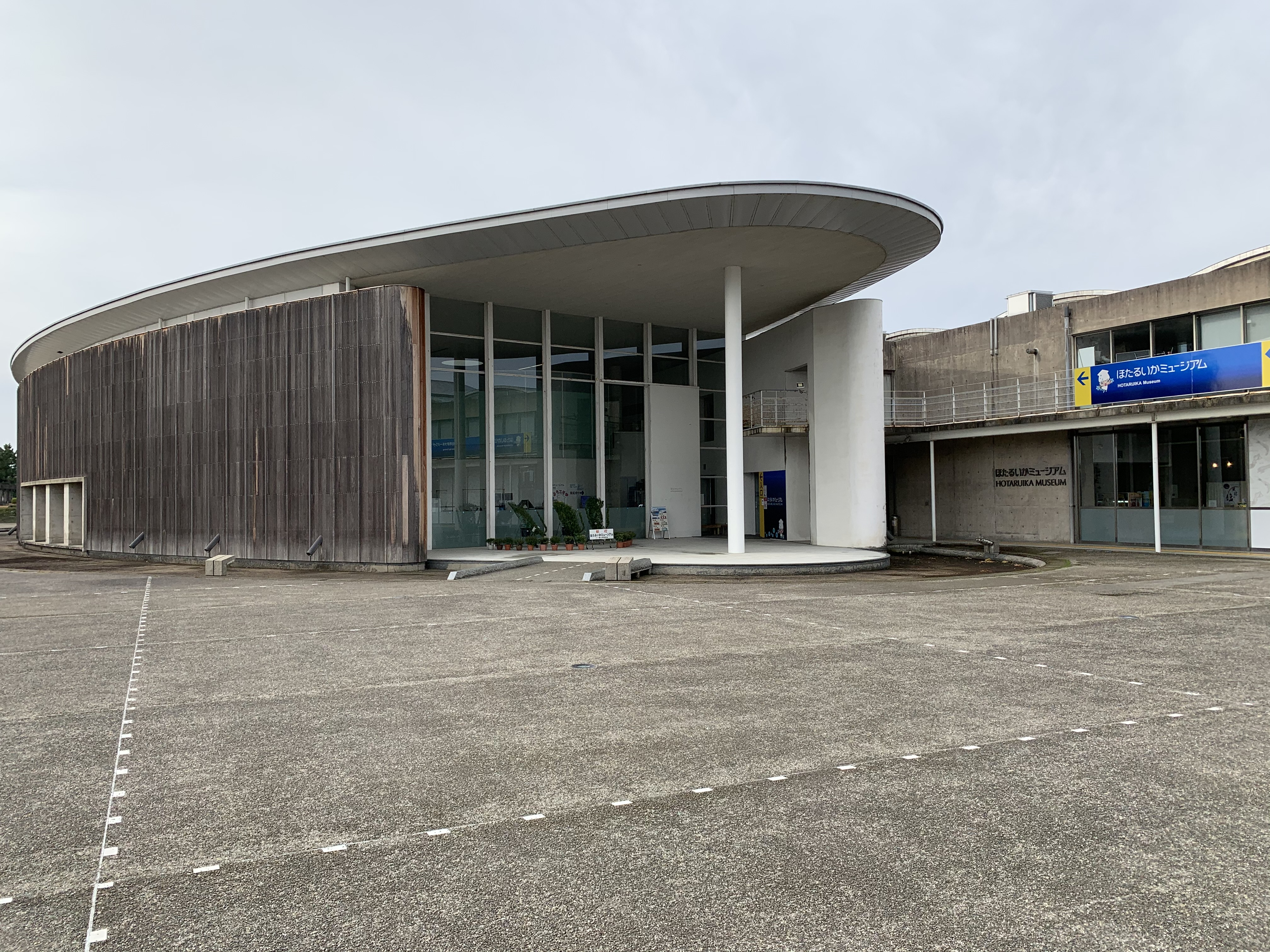
Firefly Squid Museum in Namerikawa

Namerikawa (滑川市, Namerikawa-shi) is a city in eastern Toyama Prefecture, Japan. As of 1 January 2024, the city had an estimated population of 32,728 in 12,372 households and a population density of 605 persons per km^{2}. Its total area was 54.63 square kilometres (21.09 sq mi). The coast of Namerikawa is the habitat of the world famous glowing firefly squid (ほたるいか, hotaru-ika), which surface yearly in a phenomenon; thus, the waters of Namerikawa have been designated a Special Natural Monument by the Japanese government. The city was founded on March 1, 1954.

== Geography ==
Namerikawa is in northeastern Toyama Prefecture, in the Hayatsuki river delta and is bordered by the Sea of Japan (Toyama Bay) to the northwest. Namerikawa is located 1 hour by air (via Toyama Airport), 3 hours by rail and 5 hours by car from Tokyo. Since March 2015, rail access is possible via Hokuriku Shinkansen high-speed train from nearby Toyama. The city area is formed on the alluvial fan between the Hayatsuki River and the Kamiichi River. Namerikawa has a Humid subtropical climate (Köppen Cfa) characterized by mild summers and cold winters with heavy snowfall. The average annual temperature in Namerikawa is 13.9 °C. The average annual rainfall is 2317 mm with September as the wettest month. The temperatures are highest on average in August, at around 26.4 °C, and lowest in January, at around 2.6 °C.

=== Surrounding municipalities ===
- Toyama Prefecture
  - Kamiichi
  - Toyama
  - Uozu

== Demographics ==
Per Japanese census data, the population of Namerikawa has remained relatively steady over the past 50 years.

Historical population
Year	Pop.	±%
1970	30,039	—
1980	30,744	+2.3%
1990	30,923	+0.6%
2000	33,363	+7.9%
2010	33,676	+0.9%
2020	32,349	−3.9%
2021	33,102	+2.3%
2022	33,039	−0.2%
2023	32,878	−0.5%
2024	32,728	−0.5%

== History ==
The area of present-day Namerikawa was part of ancient Etchū Province. During the Heian period, much of the area was part of shōen controlled by Yasaka Shrine in Kyoto. During the Edo period it was part of the territory controlled by the Maeda clan of Kaga Domain. The town of Namerkawa was created within Nakaniikawa District, Toyama with the establishment of the modern municipalities system on April 1, 1889. On November 1, 1953, Namerigawa merged with the neighboring villages of Nakakazumi, Higashikazumi, Nishikazumi, Kitakazumi, Hamakazumi and Hayatsukikazumi. It was raised to city status on March 1, 1954.

== Government ==
Namerikawa has a mayor-council form of government with a directly elected mayor and a unicameral city legislature of 15 members.

== Economy ==
Once a rural town in the overlooking Toyama bay, then prospering as inn town on the Hokuriku Kaidō, Namerikawa has developed as an industrial city and commercial center, and is increasingly a bedroom community for nearby Uozu.

== Education ==
Namekawa has seven public elementary schools and two public junior high schools operated by the town government, and one public high school operated by the Toyama Prefectural Board of Education.

== Transportation ==
=== Railway ===
- Ainokaze Toyama Railway
  - Higashi-Namerikawa-Namerikawa
- Toyama Chihō Railway
  - Nakakazumi - Nishi-Kazumi - Nishi-Namerikawa - Naka-Namerikawa - Namerikawa - Hamakazumi - Hayatsukikazumi - Etchū-Nakamura

=== Highway ===
- Hokuriku Expressway
- National Route 8

== Local attractions ==
- To promote firefly-squid-themed eco-tourism and education, the world's only firefly squid museum opened in March 1998.

== Sister cities ==
Namerikawa has several sister cities:

- (Japan) Komoro, Nagano, since 1974
- (Japan) Toyokoro, Hokkaidō, since 1984
- (Japan) Nasushiobara, Tochigi, since 1996
- Schaumburg, Illinois, United States, since 1997
