= Etchū-Nakamura Station =

Railway station in Namerikawa, Toyama Prefecture, Japan

Etchū-Nakamura Station 越中中村駅
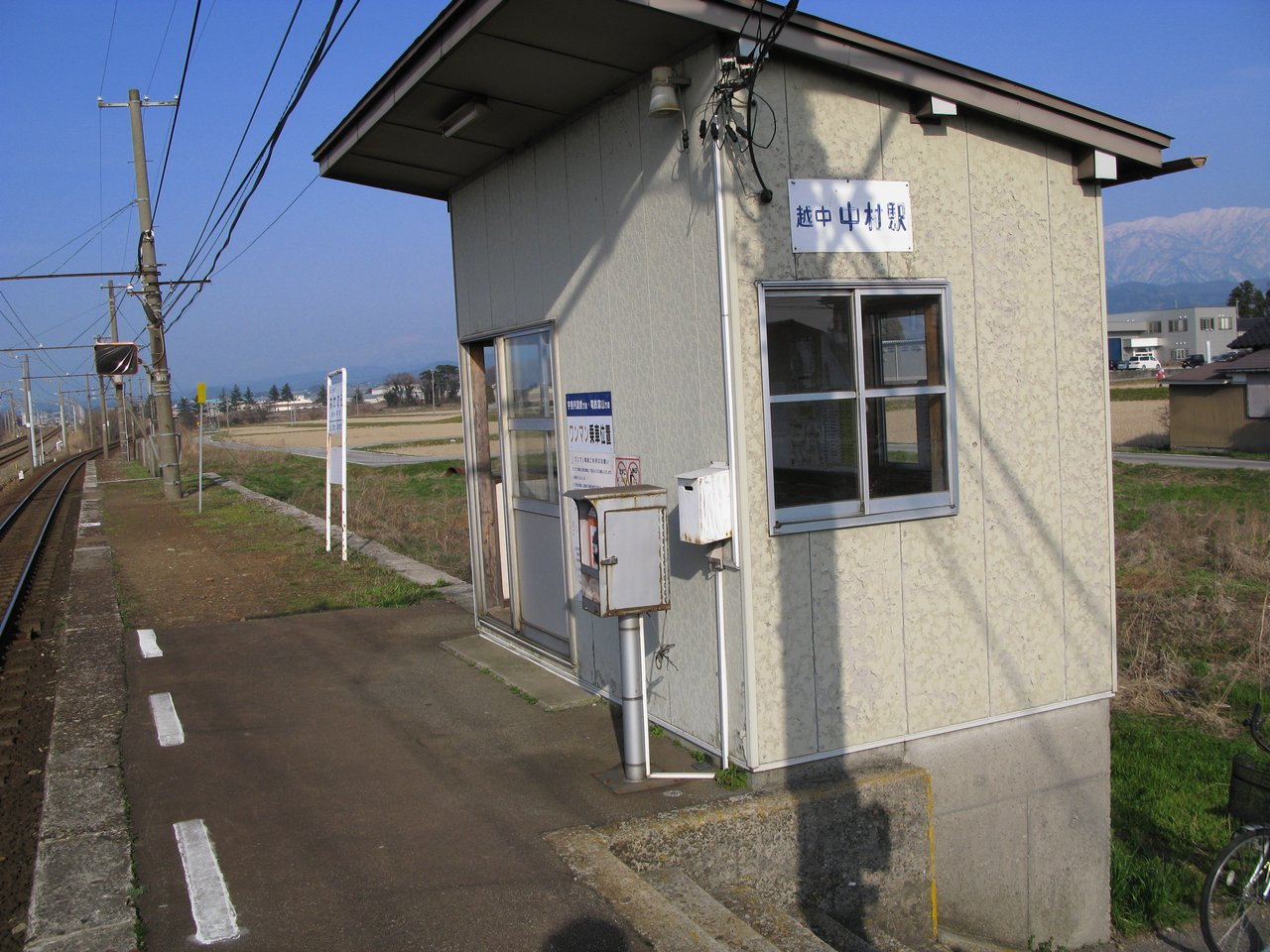
- Etchū-Nakamura Station in March 2009

General information
- Location: 1319-1 Nakamura, Namerikawa-shi, Toyama-ken 936-0002; Japan
- Coordinates: 36.7906°N 137.3825°E
- Operator: Toyama Chihō Railway
- Line: ■ Toyama Chihō Railway Main Line
- Distance: 25.6 from Dentetsu-Toyama
- Platforms: 1 side platform
- Tracks: 1

Other information
- Status: Unstaffed
- Website: Official website

History
- Opened: 14 December 1935
- Former names: Hayakawa Station (to 1950)
Location
- Location within Japan

Etchū-Nakamura Station (越中中村駅, Etchū-Nakamura-eki) is a railway station in the city of Namerikawa, Toyama, Japan, operated by the private railway operator Toyama Chihō Railway.

== Lines ==
Etchū-Nakamura Station is served by the Toyama Chihō Railway Main Line, and is 25.6 kilometers from the starting point of the line at Dentetsu-Toyama.

== Station layout ==
The station has one ground-level side platform serving a single bi-directional track. The station is unattended.

== History ==
Etchū-Nakamura Station was opened on 14 December 1935 as Hayatsuki Station (早月駅). The station was renamed to its present name on 23 March 1950.

== Adjacent stations ==
«	Service	»
Toyama Chihō Railway Main Line
Limited Express: Does not stop at this station
Rapid Express: Does not stop at this station
Express: Does not stop at this station
Hayatsukikazumi	Local	Nishi-Uozu

== Surrounding area ==
The station is located in a residential area.

== See also ==
- List of railway stations in Japan
