= Shin-Uozu Station =

Railway station in Uozu, Toyama Prefecture, Japan

Shin-Uozu Station 新魚津駅
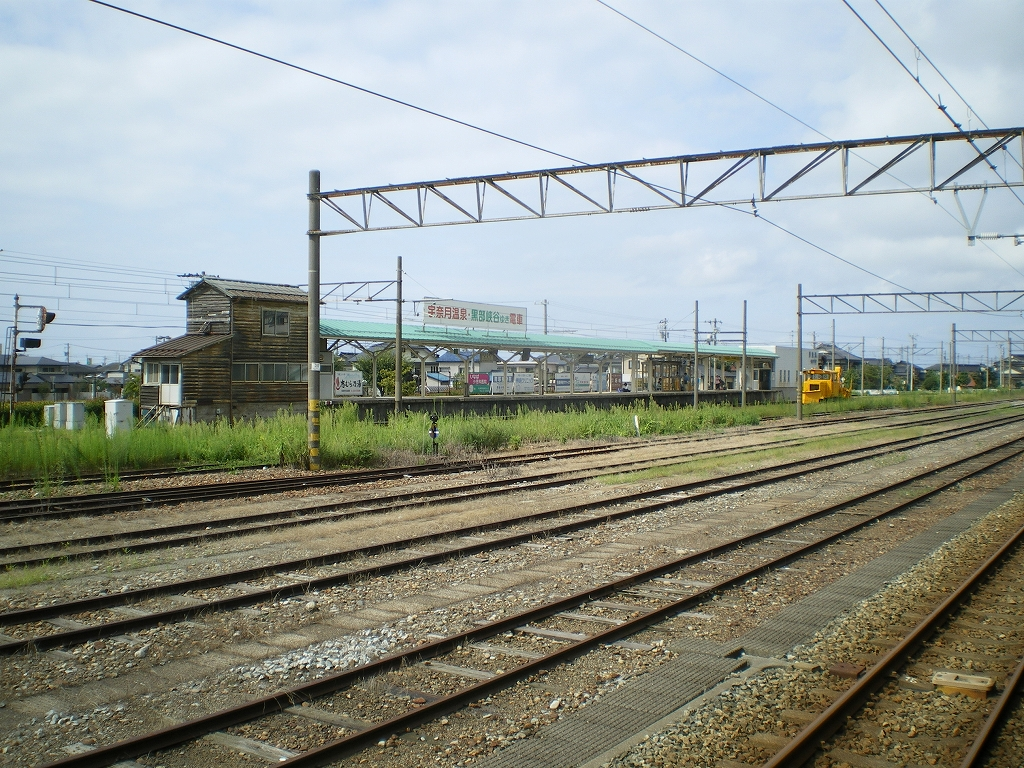
- Shin-Uozu Station in September 2009

General information
- Location: 430-1 Shakado, Uozu-shi, Toyama-ken 937-0067; Japan
- Coordinates: 36.8266386°N 137.40592°E
- Operator: Toyama Chihō Railway
- Line: ■ Toyama Chihō Railway Main Line
- Distance: 28.9 from Dentetsu-Toyama
- Platforms: 1 island platform
- Tracks: 2
- Connections: Uozu Station

Other information
- Status: Staffed
- Website: Official website

History
- Opened: 21 August 1936

Passengers
- FY2015: 1440
Location
- Location within Japan

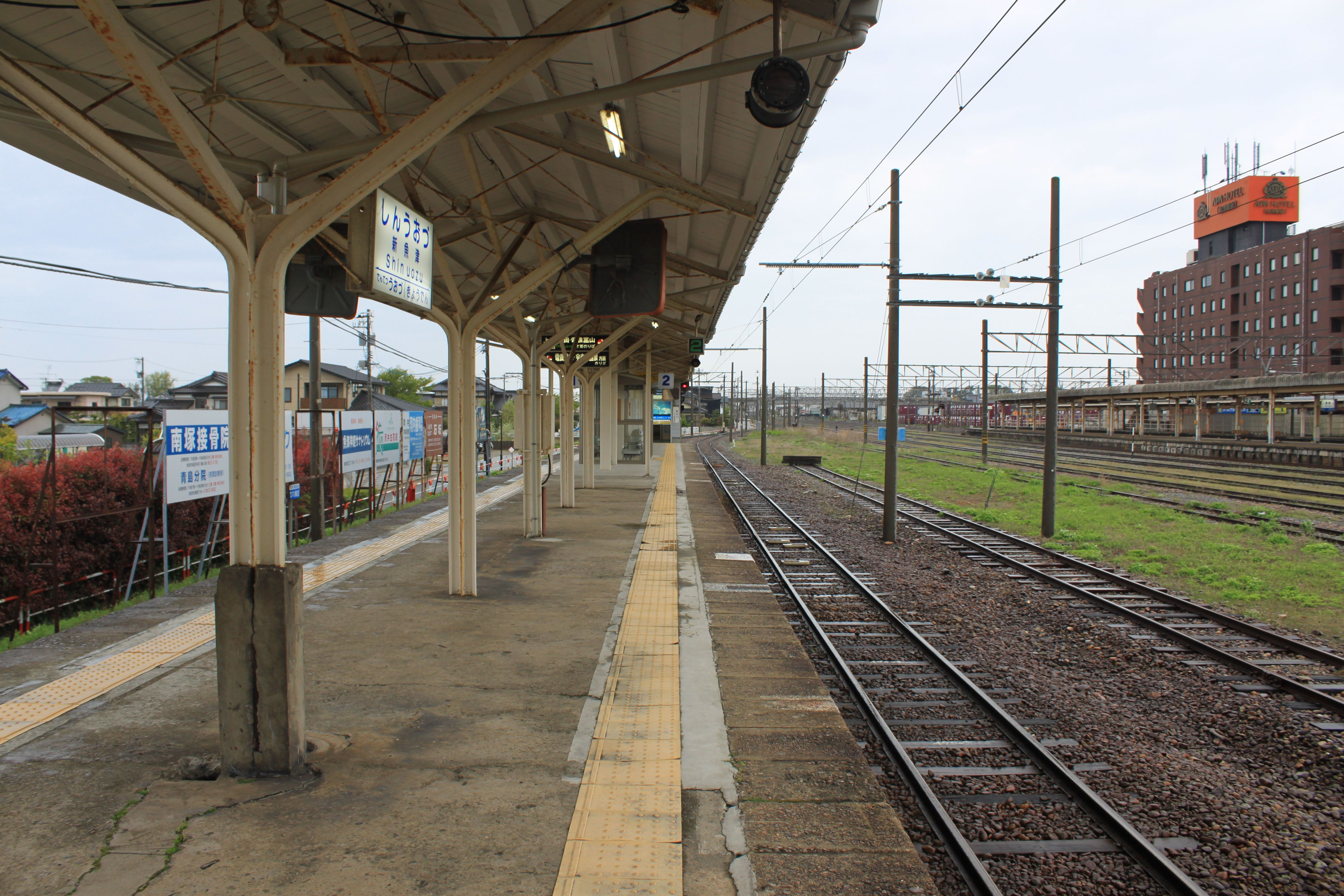
Shin-Uozu Station platform

Shin-Uozu Station (新魚津駅, Shin-Uozu-eki) is a railway station in the city of Uozu, Toyama, Japan, operated by the private railway operator Toyama Chihō Railway.

== Lines ==
Shin-Uozu Station is served by the Toyama Chihō Railway Main Line, and is 30.2 kilometers from the starting point of the line at Dentetsu-Toyama.

== Station layout ==
The station has one ground-level island platform serving two tracks connected by an underground passage. The station is staffed.

=== Platforms ===
1	■ Toyama Chihō Railway Main Line	for Dentetsu Kurobe and Unazuki-Onsen
2	■ Toyama Chihō Railway Main Line	for Dentetsu Toyama

== History ==
Shin-Uozu Station was opened on 21 August 1936.

== Adjacent stations ==
«	Service	»
Toyama Chihō Railway Main Line
Dentetsu-Uozu	Limited Express	Dentetsu-Kurobe
Dentetsu-Uozu	Rapid Express	Kyōden
Dentetsu-Uozu	Express	Kyōden
Dentetsu-Uozu	Local	Kyōden

== Passenger statistics ==
In fiscal 2015, the station was used by 1440 passengers daily.

== Surrounding area ==
- Uozu City Hall
- Ainokaze Toyama Railway Line Uozu Station

== See also ==
- List of railway stations in Japan
