= Hayatsukikazumi Station =

Railway station in Namerikawa, Toyama Prefecture, Japan

Hayatsukikazumi Station 早月加積駅
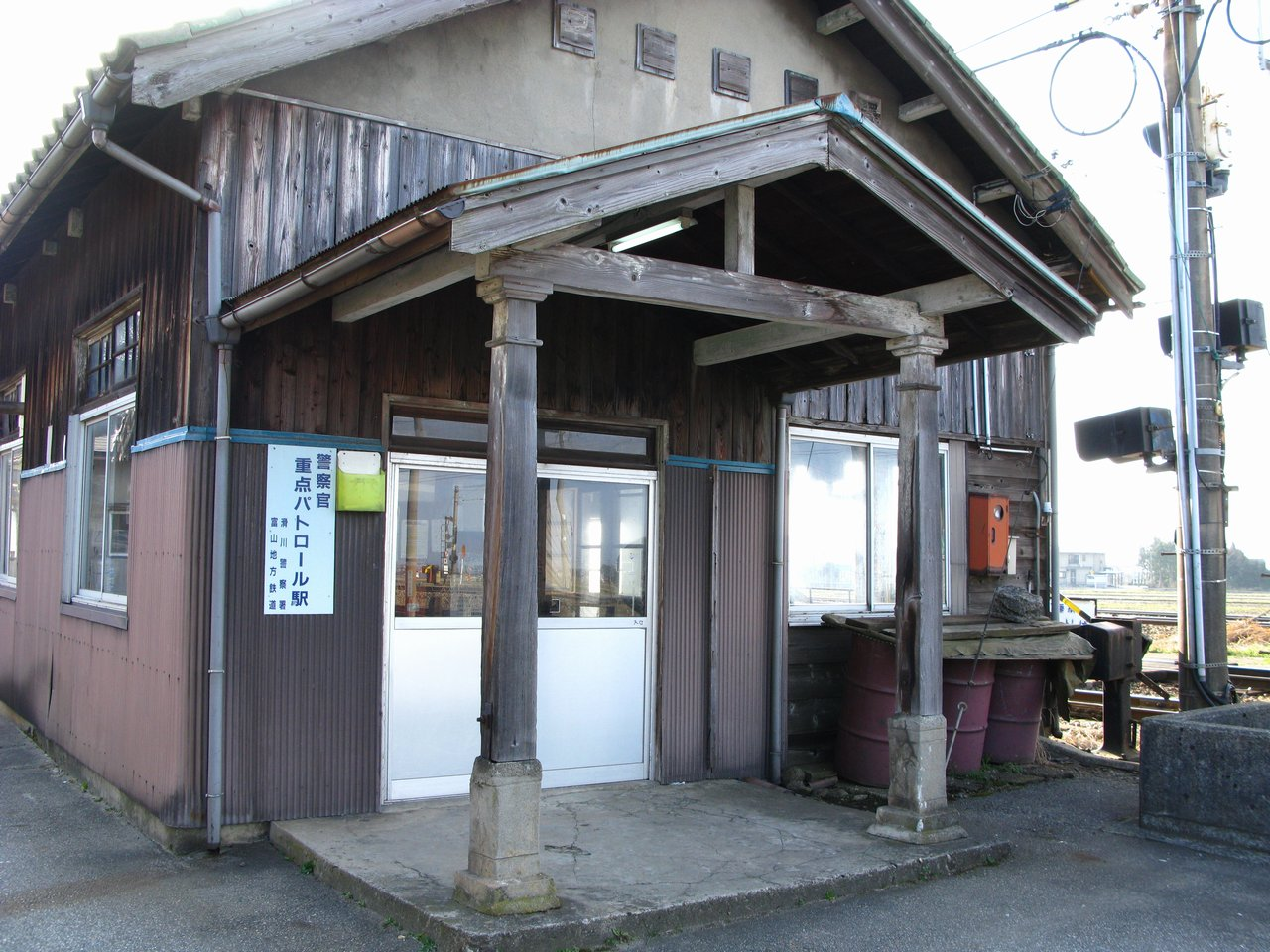
- Hayatsukikazumi Station in March 2009

General information
- Location: 1243-1 Oiwakei, Namerikawa-shi, Toyama-ken 936-0808; Japan
- Coordinates: 36.7841°N 137.3721°E
- Operator: Toyama Chihō Railway
- Line: ■ Toyama Chihō Railway Main Line
- Distance: 24.4 from Dentetsu-Toyama
- Platforms: 2 side platforms
- Tracks: 2

Other information
- Status: Unstaffed
- Website: Official website

History
- Opened: 23 March 1950
Location
- Location within Japan

Hayatsukikazumi Station (早月加積駅, Hayatsukikazumi-eki) is a railway station in the city of Namerikawa, Toyama, Japan, operated by the private railway operator Toyama Chihō Railway.

== Lines ==
Hayatsukikazumi Station is served by the Toyama Chihō Railway Main Line, and is 24.4 kilometers from the starting point of the line at Dentetsu-Toyama.

== Station layout ==
The station has two opposed ground-level side platforms connected to the wooden station building by a level crossing. The station is unattended.

== History ==
Hayatsukikazumi Station was opened on 23 March 1950.

== Adjacent stations ==
«	Service	»
Toyama Chihō Railway Main Line
Limited Express: Does not stop at this station
Namerikawa	Rapid Express	Nishi-Uozu
Namerikawa	Express	Nishi-Uozu
Hamakazumi	Local	Etchū-Nakamura

== Surrounding area ==
The station is located in a residential area.

== See also ==
- List of railway stations in Japan
