= Dentetsu-Ishida Station =

Railway station in Kurobe, Toyama Prefecture, Japan

Dentetsu-Ishida Station 電鉄石田駅
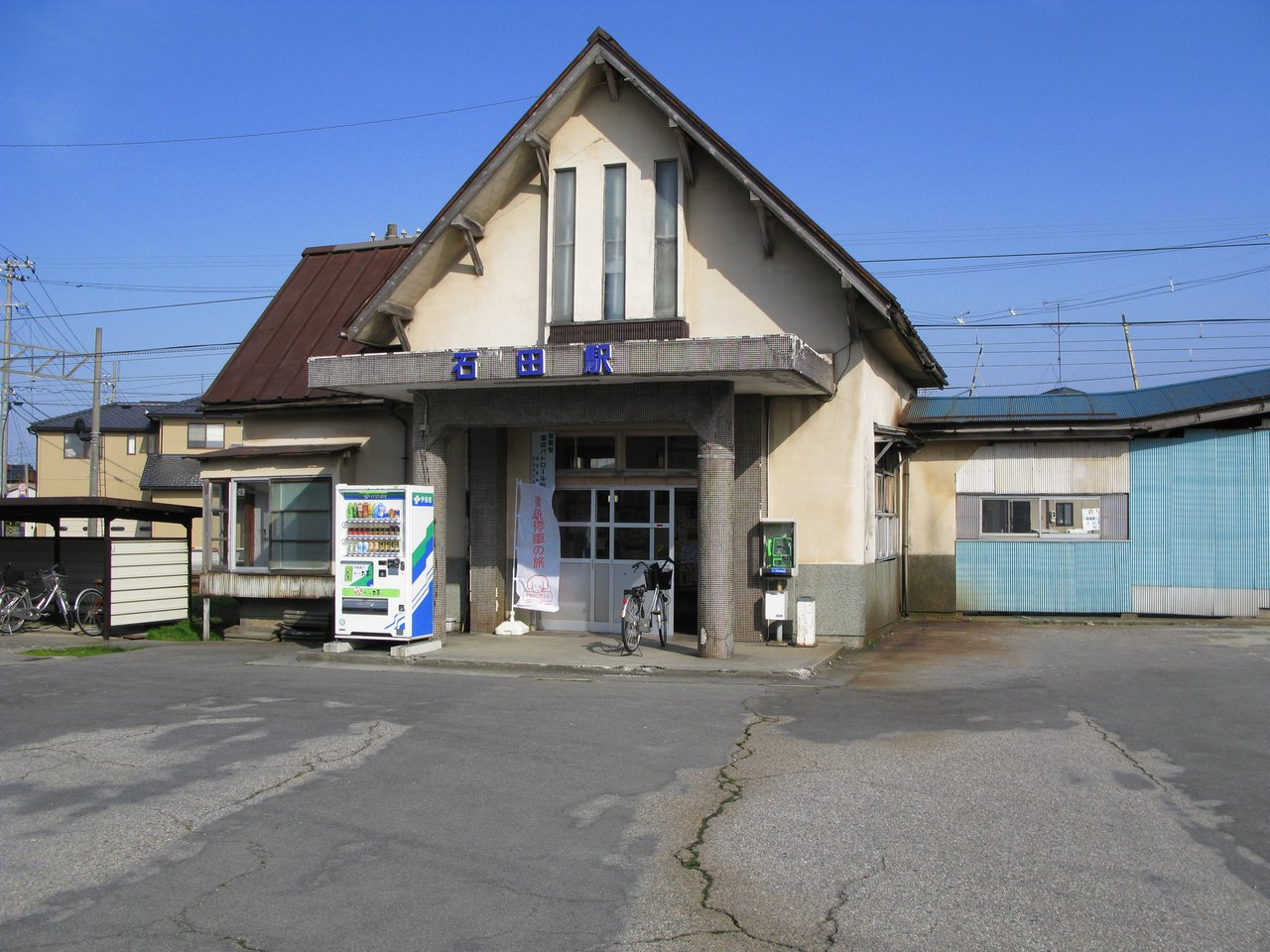
- Dentetsu-Ishida Station in March 2008

General information
- Location: 253-2 Oka, Kurobe-shi, Toyama-ken 938-0054; Japan
- Coordinates: 36.8661°N 137.4234°E
- Operator: Toyama Chihō Railway
- Line: ■ Toyama Chihō Railway Main Line
- Distance: 34.9 from Dentetsu-Toyama
- Platforms: 1 side platform
- Tracks: 2

Other information
- Status: Unstaffed
- Website: Official website

History
- Opened: 1 June 1940

Passengers
- FY2015: 262
Location
- Location within Japan

Dentetsu-Ishida Station (電鉄石田駅, Dentetsu-Ishida-eki) is a railway station in the city of Kurobe, Toyama, Japan, operated by the private railway operator Toyama Chihō Railway.

== Lines ==
Dentetsu-Ishida Station is served by the Toyama Chihō Railway Main Line, and is 34.9 kilometers from the starting point of the line at Dentetsu-Toyama.

== Station layout ==
The station has two opposed ground-level side platforms serving two tracks connected by a level crossing. The station is unattended.

=== Platforms ===
1	■ Toyama Chihō Railway Main Line	for Dentetsu-Kurobe and Unazuki-Onsen
2	■ Toyama Chihō Railway Main Line	for Dentetsu Toyama

== History ==
Dentetsu-Ishida Station was opened on 1 June 1940.

== Adjacent stations ==
«	Service	»
Toyama Chihō Railway Main Line
Limited Express: Does not stop at this station
Kyōden	Rapid Express	Dentetsu Kurobe
Kyōden	Express	Dentetsu Kurobe
Kyōden	Local	Dentetsu Kurobe

== Passenger statistics ==
In fiscal 2015, the station was used by 262 passengers daily.

== Surrounding area ==
- Ishida Post Office
- Ishida Elementary School

== See also ==
- List of railway stations in Japan
