= Nishi-Kazumi Station =

Railway station in Namerikawa, Toyama Prefecture, Japan

Nishi-Kazumi Station 西加積駅
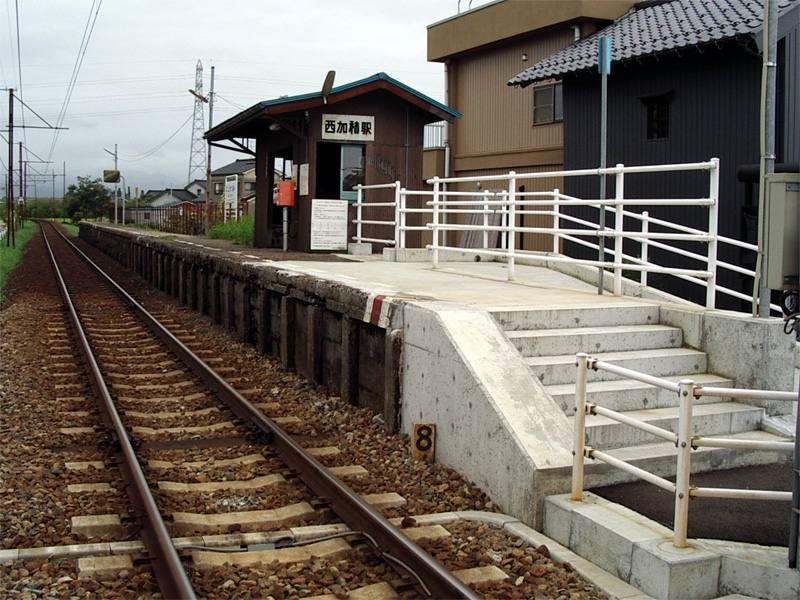
- Nishi-Kazumi Station in 2008

General information
- Location: 621 Shimo-Umezawa, Namerikawa-shi, Toyama-ken 936-085; Japan
- Coordinates: 36.7463°N 137.3400°E
- Operator: Toyama Chihō Railway
- Line: ■ Toyama Chihō Railway Main Line
- Distance: 18.7 from Dentetsu-Toyama
- Platforms: 1 side platform
- Tracks: 1

Other information
- Status: Unstaffed
- Website: Official website

History
- Opened: 25 June 1913
- Former names: Umezawa Station (to 1921)
Location
- Location within Japan

Nishi-Kazumi Station (西加積駅, Nishi-Kazumi-eki) is a railway station in the city of Namerikawa, Toyama, Japan, operated by the private railway operator Toyama Chihō Railway.

== Lines ==
Nishi-Kazumi Station is served by the Toyama Chihō Railway Main Line, and is 18.7 kilometers from the starting point of the line at Dentetsu-Toyama.

== Station layout ==
The station has one ground-level side platform serving a single bi-directional track. The station is unattended.

== History ==
Nishi-Kazumi Station was opened on 25 June 1913 as Umezawa Station (梅沢駅). It was rebated to its present name on 20 February 1921.

== Adjacent stations ==
«	Service	»
Toyama Chihō Railway Main Line
Limited Express: Does not stop at this station
Rapid Express: Does not stop at this station
Express: Does not stop at this station
Naka-Kazumi	Local	Nishi-Namerikawa

== Surrounding area ==
- Seibu Elementary School

== See also ==
- List of railway stations in Japan
