= Namerikawa Station =

Railway station in Namerikawa, Toyama Prefecture, Japan

Namerikawa Station 滑川駅
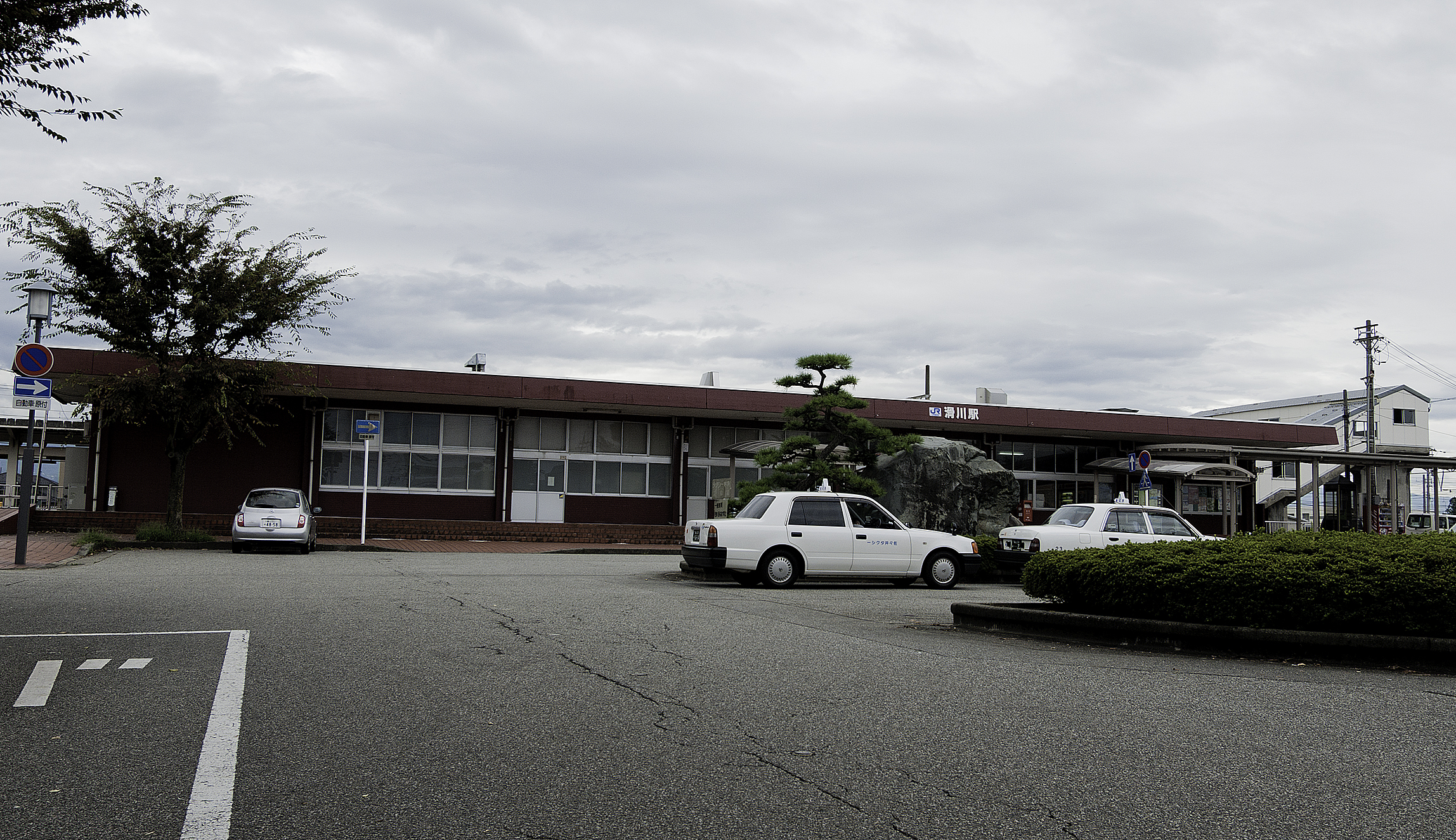
- Namerikawa Station in September 2011

General information
- Location: Tatsuno, Namerikawa-shi, Toyama-ken 936-0024; Japan
- Coordinates: 36.7689188°N 137.3487031°E
- Operator: Ainokaze Toyama Railway; Toyama Chihō Railway
- Lines: ■ Ainokaze Toyama Railway Line; ■ Toyama Chihō Railway Main Line
- Platforms: 2 side +1 island platforms
- Tracks: 3

Other information
- Status: Staffed

History
- Opened: 24 March 1906

Passengers
- FY2015: 1,368 daily (Ainokaze), 319 daily (Toyama)
Location
- Location within Japan

Namerikawa Station (滑川駅, Namerikawa-eki) is a railway station in the city of Namerikawa, Toyama, Japan, operated jointly by the private railway operator Toyama Chiho Railway and the third-sector railway operator Ainokaze Toyama Railway.

== Lines ==
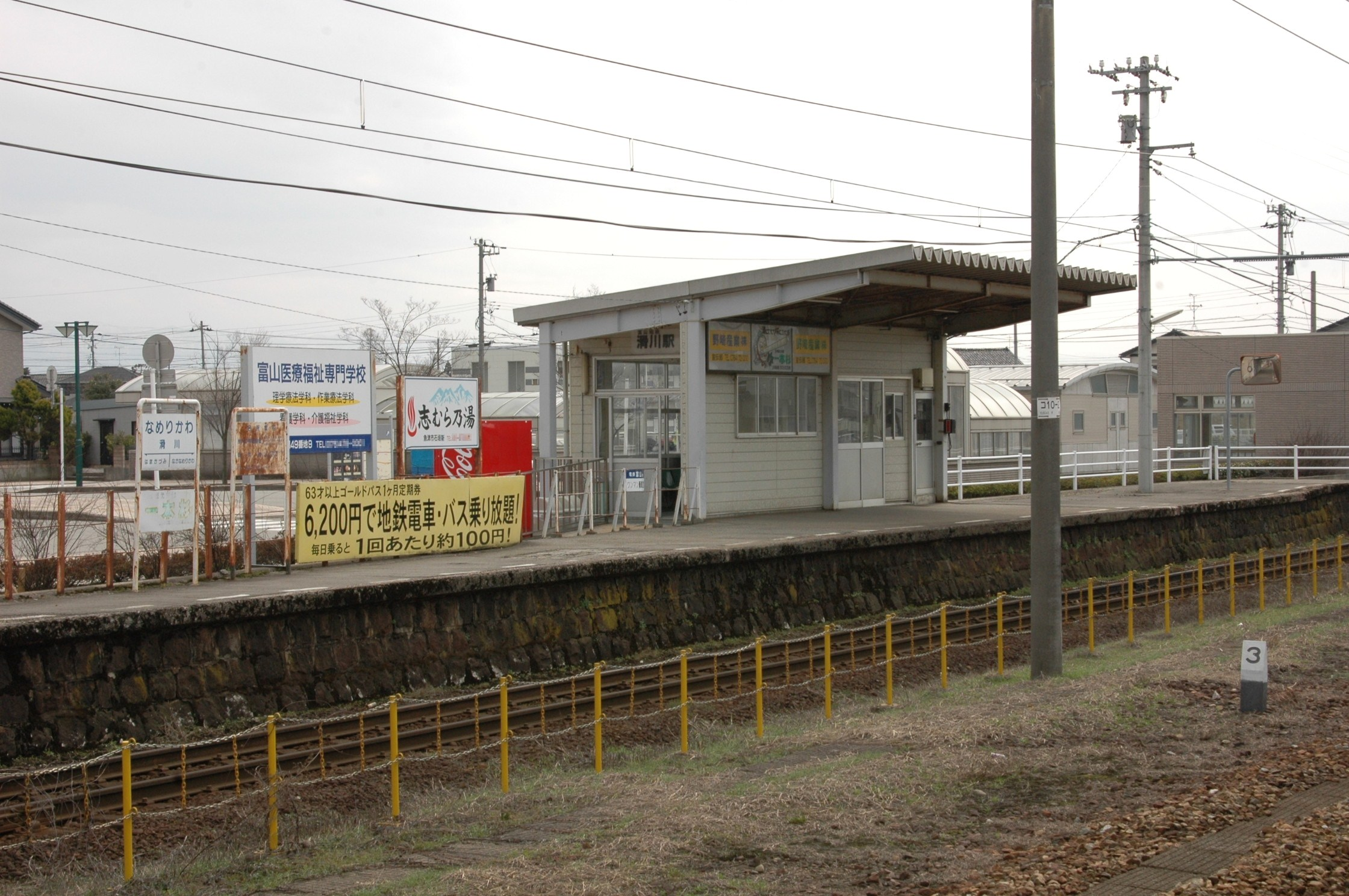
The Toyama Chihō Railway station, March 2011

Namerikawa Station is served by the Ainokaze Toyama Railway Line, and is 58.6 km (36.4 mi) from the starting point of the line at Kurikara, and 76.4 km (47.5 mi) from Kanazawa. It is also served by the Toyama Chihō Railway Main Line, and is 21.8 km (13.5 mi) from the starting point of the line at Dentetsu-Toyama.

== Station layout ==
The Ainokaze Toyama Railway portion of the station has one ground-level side platform and one ground-level island platform connected by a footbridge. The station is staffed. The Toyama Chihō Railway portion of the station has a single unnumbered ground-level side platform serving a single bi-directional track.

=== Platforms ===
1	■ Ainokaze Toyama Railway Line	for Uozu and Itoigawa
2, 3	■ Ainokaze Toyama Railway Line	for Toyama and Kanazawa
(unnumbered)	■ Toyama Chihō Railway Main Line	for Dentetsu Toyama and Unazuki-Onsen

== History ==
Namerikawa Station was opened on 24 March 1906, and was nationalised in 1908, becoming part of the Japanese Government Railways network, and subsequently the Japanese National Railways (JNR). The Toyama Chihō Railway portion of the station opened on 25 June 1913.

From 14 March 2015, with the opening of the Hokuriku Shinkansen extension from Nagano to Kanazawa, local passenger operations over sections of the former Hokuriku Main Line running roughly parallel to the new Shinkansen line were reassigned to different third-sector railway operating companies. From this date, Namerikawa Station was transferred to the ownership of the third-sector operating company Ainokaze Toyama Railway.

== Adjacent stations ==
«	Service	»
Ainokaze Toyama Railway Line
Mizuhashi	Local	Higashi-Namerikawa
Toyama Chihō Railway Main Line
Limited Express: Does not stop at this station
Naka-Namerikawa	Rapid Express	Hayatsukikazumi
Naka-Namerikawa	Express	Hayatsukikazumi
Naka-Namerikawa	Local	Hamakazumi

== Passenger statistics ==
In fiscal 2015, the Ainokaze Toyama Railway portion of the station was used by an average of 1368 passengers daily (boarding passengers only). The Toyama Chihō Railway portion of the station was used by 319 passengers daily.

== Surrounding area ==
- Namerikawa City Hall

== See also ==
- List of railway stations in Japan
