= Kensuke Kitahama =

Japanese shogi player

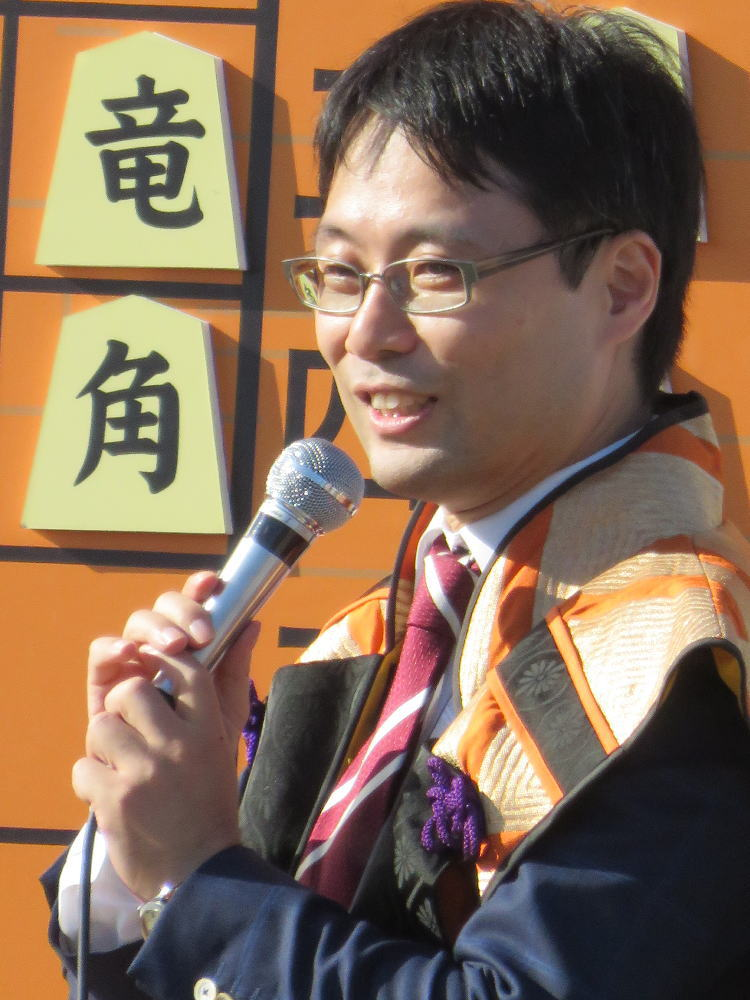
- Kitahama at a November 2019 human shogi event in Himeji, Japan.
- Native name: 北浜健介
- Born: December 28, 1975 (age 50)
- Hometown: Ebina, Kanagawa
- Nationality: Japanese

Career
- Achieved professional status: April 1, 1994 (aged 18)
- Badge number: 211
- Rank: 8-dan
- Teacher: Yoshimasa Saeki (9-dan)
- Meijin class: B2
- Ryūō class: 5

Websites
- JSA profile page

Kensuke Kitahama (北浜 健介, Kitahama Kensuke; born December 28, 1975) is a Japanese professional shogi player ranked 8-dan.

== Early life, amateur shogi and apprenticeship ==
Kensuke Kitahama was born in Ebina, Kanagawa on December 28, 1975. As a sixth-grade elementary school student, he finished runner-up to Kōsuke Tamura in the 12th Elementary Student Meijin Tournament in 1987.

In September 1988, Kitahama entered the Japan Shogi Association's apprentice school at the rank of 6-kyū under the sponsorship of shogi professional Yoshimasa Saeki. He was promoted to 1-dan in 1992 and obtained full professional status and the rank of 4-dan in April 1994.

== Shogi professional ==
In August 2026, Kitahama became the 69th professional to win 600 official games when he defeated Takuya Nishida in an 85th Meijin Class B2 Ranking League game.

=== Promotion history ===
The promotion history for Kitahama is as follows:

- 6-kyū: 1988
- 1-dan: 1992
- 4-dan: April 1, 1994
- 5-dan: April 1, 1996
- 6-dan: April 1, 1998
- 7-dan: April 1, 2003
- 8-dan: March 7, 2013

== Personal life ==
Kitahama graduated from Waseda University in 2000.
