= Dentetsu-Kurobe Station =

Railway station in Kurobe, Toyama Prefecture, Japan

Dentetsu-Kurobe Station 電鉄黒部駅
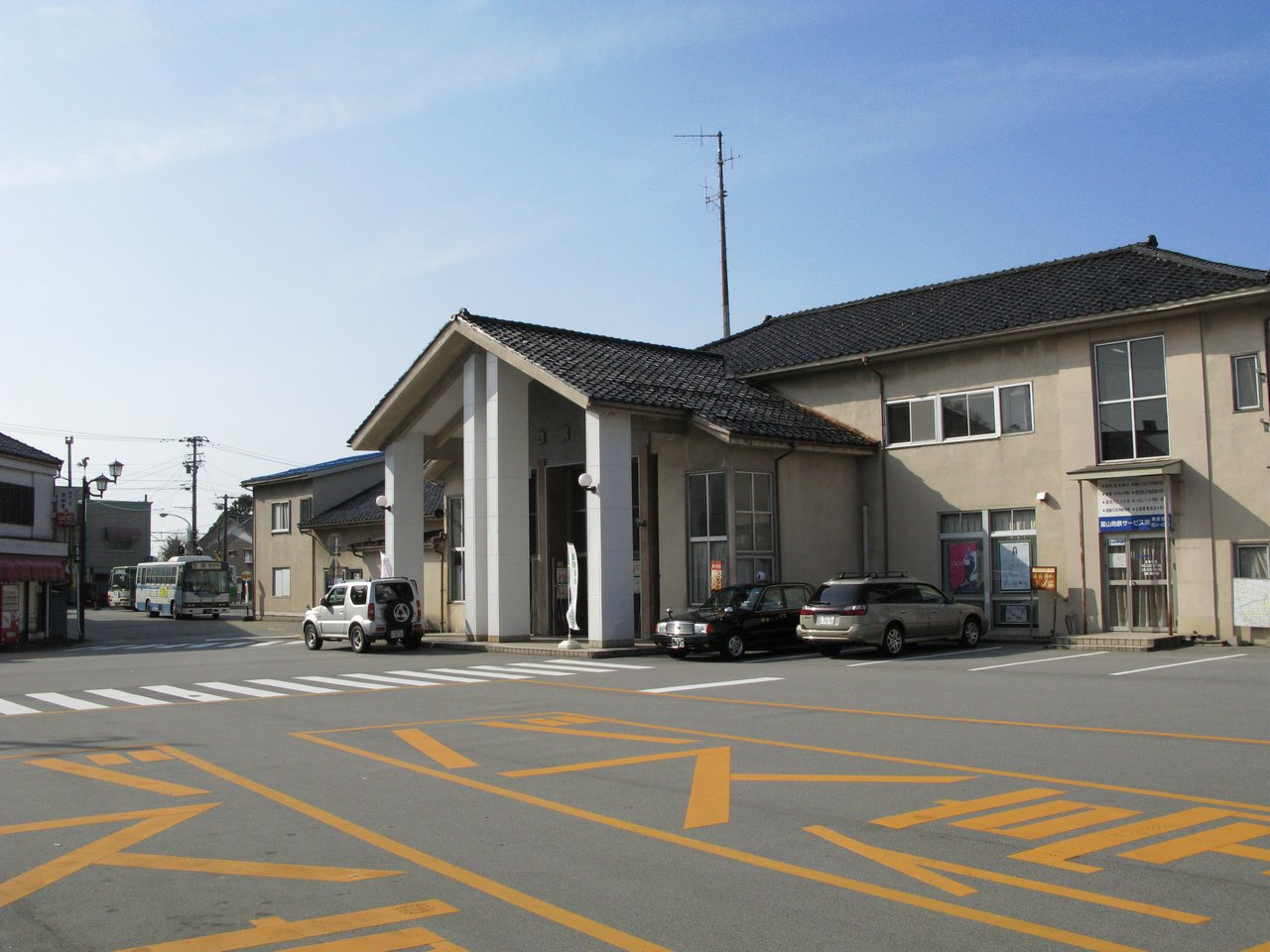
- Dentetsu-Kurobe Station in September 2009

General information
- Location: 815 Mikkabi, Kurobe-shi, Toyama-ken 9938-0031; Japan
- Coordinates: 36.8742°N 137.4444°E
- Operator: Toyama Chihō Railway
- Line: ■ Toyama Chihō Railway Main Line
- Distance: 37.2 km from Dentetsu-Toyama
- Platforms: 2 side + 1 island platform
- Tracks: 3

Other information
- Status: Staffed
- Website: Official website

History
- Opened: 5 November 1922
- Former names: Nishi-Mikkaichi (to 1951); Dentetsu-Sakurai (to 1989)

Passengers
- FY2015: 748 daily
Location
- Location within Japan

Dentetsu-Kurobe Station (電鉄黒部駅, Dentetsu-Kurobe-eki) is a railway station on the Toyama Chihō Railway Main Line in the city of Kurobe, Toyama, Japan, operated by the private railway operator Toyama Chihō Railway.

== Lines ==
Dentetsu-Kurobe Station is served by the Toyama Chihō Railway Main Line, and is 37.2 kilometers from the starting point of the line at Dentetsu-Toyama.

== Station layout ==
The station has two ground-level opposed island platforms with one ground-level island platform sandwiched in-between. The platforms are reached by crossing the first track by a level crossing and walking up the stairs. The side platform furthest from the station building is not in service. The station is staffed. There is a depot with two tracks at the opposite side of the station building. To the east from the station building, there is a dead-end track.

== History ==
The station opened on 5 November 1922 as Nishi-Mikkaichi Station (西三日市駅). It was renamed Dentetsu-Sakurai Station (電鉄桜井駅) in June 1951, and renamed Dentetsu-Kurobe Station on 1 April 1989.

== Adjacent stations ==
| « | Service | » |
Toyama Chihō Railway Main Line
| Shin-Uozu | Limited Express | Higashi-Mikkaichi |
| Dentetsu-Ishida | Rapid Express | Higashi-Mikkaichi |
| Dentetsu-Ishida | Express | Higashi-Mikkaichi |
| Dentetsu-Ishida | Local | Higashi-Mikkaichi |

== Passenger statistics ==
In fiscal 2015, the station was used by 748 passengers daily.

== Surrounding area ==
- Kurobe City Hall
- Kurobe Post Office

== See also ==
- List of railway stations in Japan
