= Nishi-Namerikawa Station =

Railway station in Namerikawa, Toyama Prefecture, Japan

Nishi-Namerikawa Station 西滑川駅
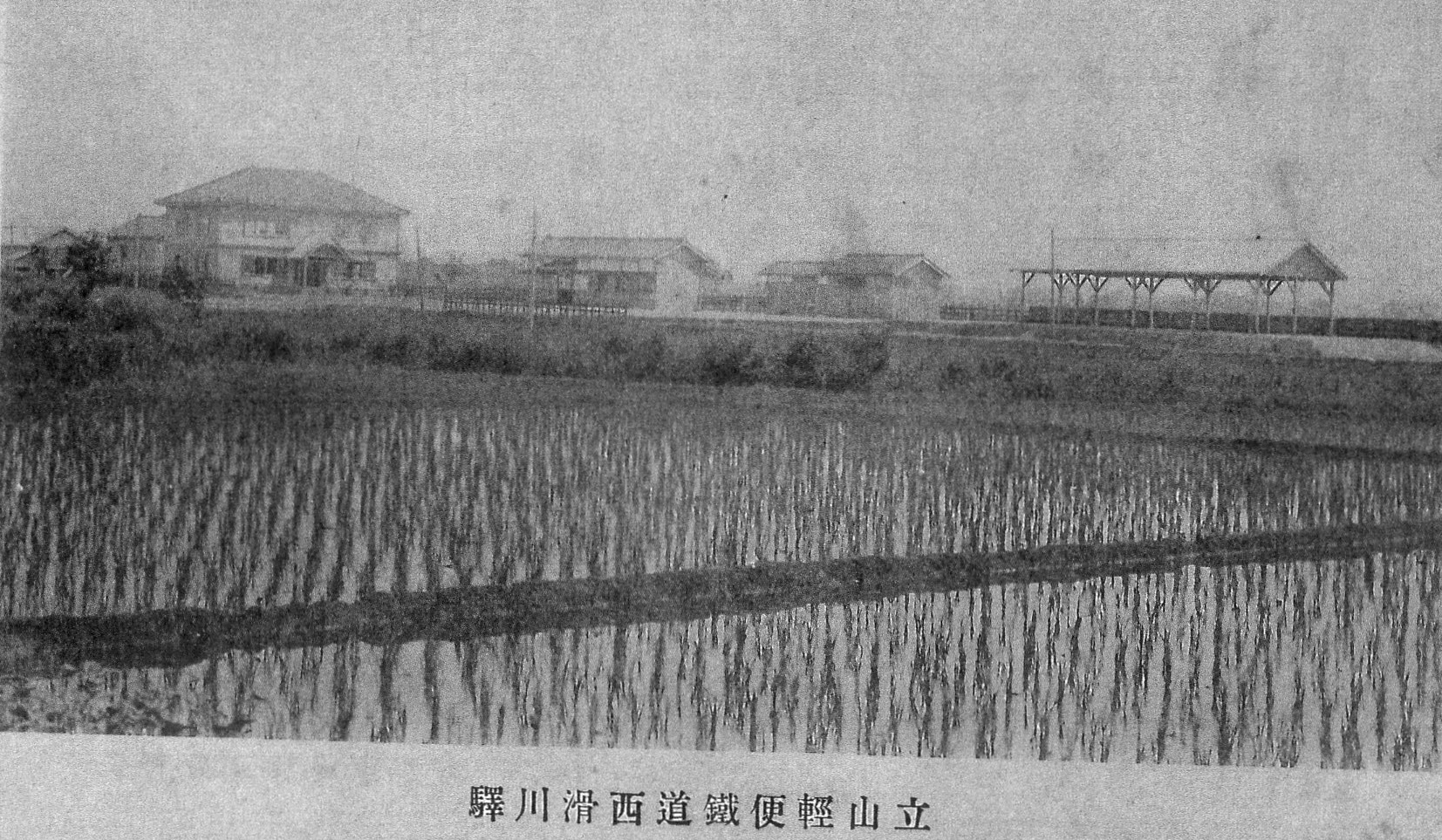
- Naka-Namerikawa Station in 1913

General information
- Location: 294-2 Komohara, Namerikawa-shi, Toyama-ken 936-0066; Japan
- Coordinates: 36.7553°N 137.3347°E
- Operator: Toyama Chihō Railway
- Line: ■ Toyama Chihō Railway Main Line
- Distance: 19.8 from Dentetsu-Toyama
- Platforms: 1 side platform
- Tracks: 1

Other information
- Status: Unstaffed
- Website: Official website

History
- Opened: 25 June 1913
Location
- Location within Japan

Nishi-Namerikawa Station (西滑川駅, Nishi-Namerikawa-eki) is a railway station in the city of Namerikawa, Toyama, Japan, operated by the private railway operator Toyama Chihō Railway.

== Lines ==
Nishi-Namerikawa Station is served by the Toyama Chihō Railway Main Line, and is 19.8 kilometers from the starting point of the line at Dentetsu-Toyama.

== Station layout ==
The station has one ground-level side platform serving a single bi-directional track. The station is unattended.

== History ==
Nishi-Namerikawa Station was opened on 25 June 1913.

== Adjacent stations ==
«	Service	»
Toyama Chihō Railway Main Line
Limited Express: Does not stop at this station
Rapid Express: Does not stop at this station
Express: Does not stop at this station
Nishi-Kazumi	Local	Naka-Namerikawa

== Surrounding area ==
- Namerikawa High School
- Namerikawa Junior High School

== See also ==
- List of railway stations in Japan
