= Kyōden Station =

Railway station in Uozu, Toyama Prefecture, Japan

Kyōden Station 経田駅
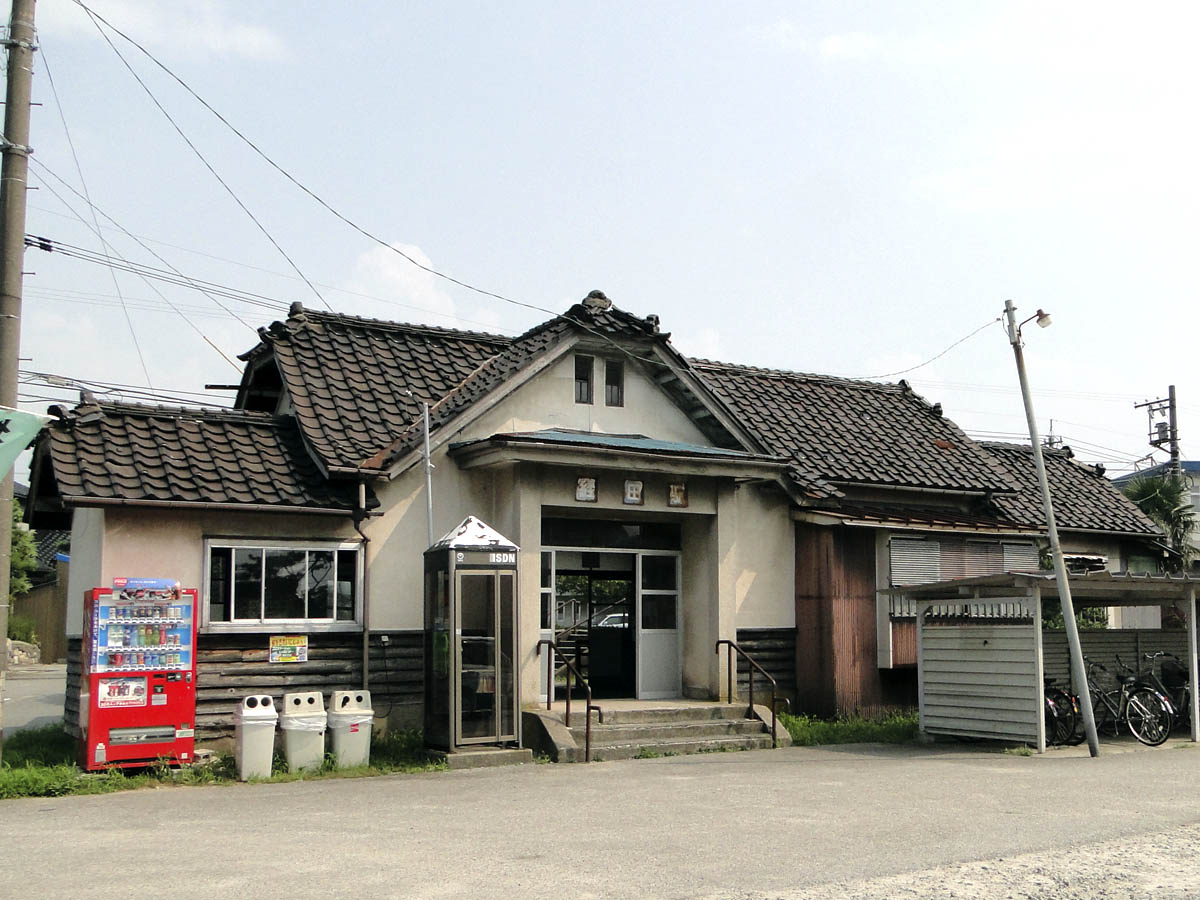
- Kyōden Station in August 2010

General information
- Location: 437-1 Hamakyōden, Uozu-shi, Toyama-ken 937-0007; Japan
- Coordinates: 36.8490°N 137.4161°E
- Operator: Toyama Chihō Railway
- Line: ■ Toyama Chihō Railway Main Line
- Distance: 32.9 from Dentetsu-Toyama
- Platforms: 1 side platform
- Tracks: 1

Other information
- Status: Staffed
- Website: Official website

History
- Opened: 1 October 1936

Passengers
- FY2015: 928
Location
- Location within Japan

Kyōden Station (経田駅, Kyōden-eki) is a railway station in the city of Uozu, Toyama, Japan, operated by the private railway operator Toyama Chihō Railway.

== Lines ==
Kyōden Station is served by the Toyama Chihō Railway Main Line, and is 32.9 kilometers from the starting point of the line at Dentetsu-Toyama.

== Station layout ==
The station has one ground-level side platform serving a single bi-directional track. The station is staffed.

== History ==
Kyōden Station was opened on 1 October 1936.

== Adjacent stations ==
«	Service	»
Toyama Chihō Railway Main Line
Limited Express: Does not stop at this station
Shin-Uozu	Rapid Express	Dentetsu-Ishida
Shin-Uozu	Express	Dentetsu-Ishida
Shin-Uozu	Local	Dentetsu-Ishida

== Passenger statistics ==
In fiscal 2015, the station was used by 928 passengers daily.

== Surrounding area ==
- Kyōden Post Office
- Kyōden Fishing Port
- Uozu Industrial High School
- Kyōden Elementary School

== See also ==
- List of railway stations in Japan
