= Kōsuke Tamura =

Japanese shogi player

- Native name: 田村康介
- Born: March 16, 1976 (age 49)
- Hometown: Uozu, Toyama, Japan

Career
- Achieved professional status: October 1, 1995 (aged 19)
- Badge Number: 217
- Rank: 7-dan
- Teacher: Nobuyuki Ōuchi (9-dan)
- Tournaments won: 1
- Meijin class: C2
- Ryūō class: 5

Websites
- JSA profile page

Kōsuke Tamura (田村 康介, Tamura Kōsuke; born March 16, 1976) is a Japanese professional shogi player ranked 7-dan.

== Early life, amateur shogi and apprenticeship ==
Kōsuke Tamura was born on March 16, 1976, in Uozu, Toyama. He won the 12th Elementary Student Meijin Tournament in 1987 when he was a sixth-grade student at Ōkubo Elementary School, defeating fellow future shogi professional Kensuke Kitahama in the final.

In November 1987, Tamura entered the Japan Shogi Association's apprentice school at the rank of 6-kyū as a protegee of shogi professional Nobuyuki Ōuchi. He was promoted to 1-dan in 1991, and then obtained full professional status and the rank of 4-dan in October 1995.

== Shogi professional ==
Tamura defeated Hisashi Namekata 2 games to 1 to win the 34th Shinjin-Ō in October 2003.

=== Promotion history ===
The promotion history for Tamura is as follows:

- 6-kyū: 1987
- 1-dan: 1991
- 4-dan: October 1, 1995
- 5-dan: September 8, 2000
- 6-dan: June 8, 2005
- 7-dan: March 4, 203

=== Titles and other championships ===
Tamura has never appeared in a major title match, but he has won one non-major shogi championships during his career.

=== Awards and honors ===
Tamura received the Japan Shogi Association Annual Shogi Award for "Best New Player" for the 2003–4 shogi year.
