= Hamakazumi Station =

Railway station in Namerikawa, Toyama Prefecture, Japan

Hamakazumi Station 浜加積駅
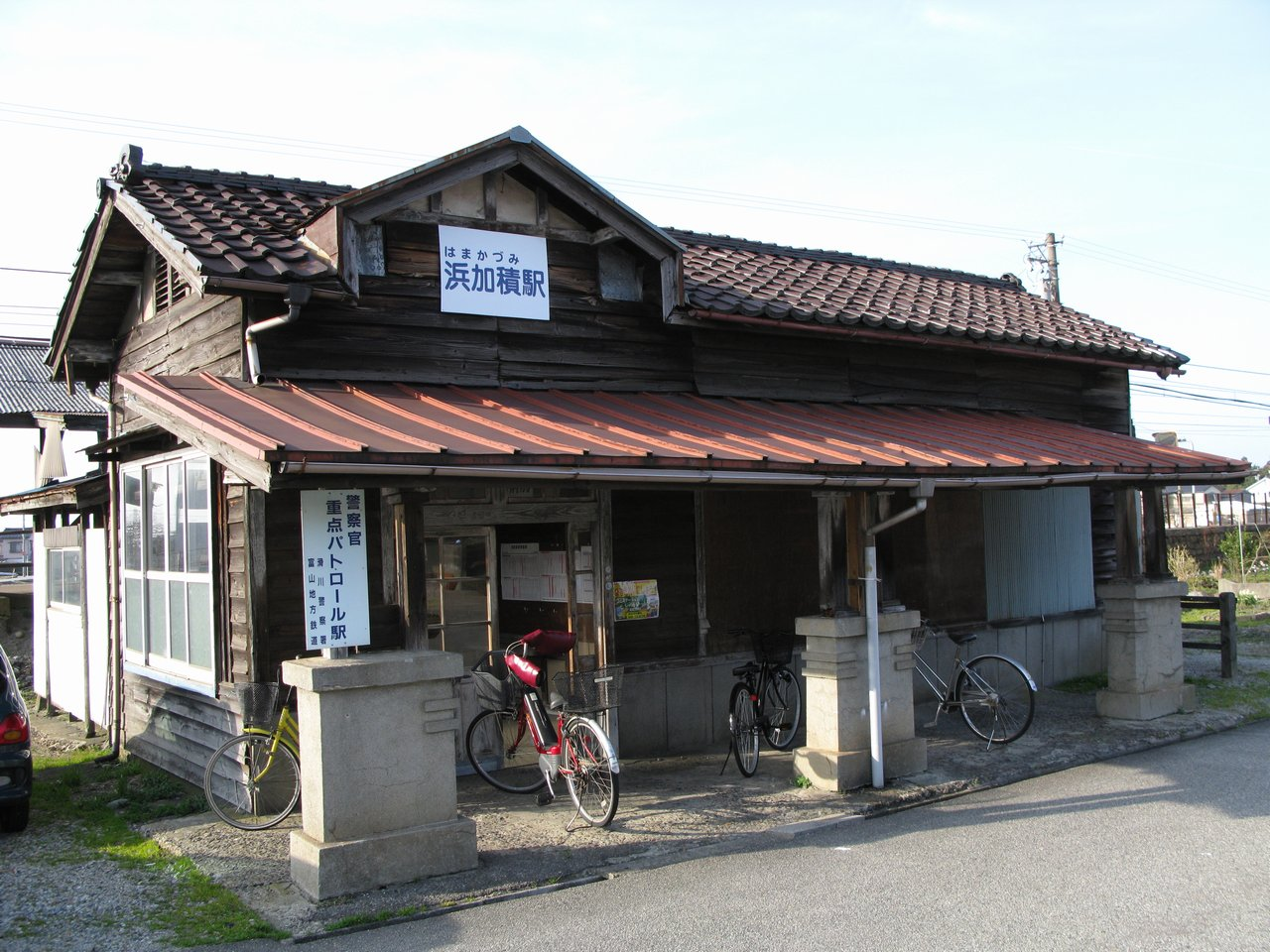
- Hamakazumi Station in March 2009

General information
- Location: 393-5 Magaribuchi, Namerikawa-shi, Toyama-ken 936-0016; Japan
- Coordinates: 36.7776°N 137.3614°E
- Operator: Toyama Chihō Railway
- Line: ■ Toyama Chihō Railway Main Line
- Distance: 23.2 from Dentetsu-Toyama
- Platforms: 1 side platform
- Tracks: 1

Other information
- Status: Unstaffed
- Website: Official website

History
- Opened: 14 December 1935
Location
- Location within Japan

Hamakazumi Station (浜加積駅, Hamakazumi-eki) is a railway station in the city of Namerikawa, Toyama, Japan, operated by the private railway operator Toyama Chihō Railway.

== Lines ==
Hamakazumi Station is served by the Toyama Chihō Railway Main Line, and is 23.2 kilometers from the starting point of the line at Dentetsu-Toyama.

== Station layout ==
The station has one ground-level side platform serving a single bi-directional track and a wooden station building. The station is unattended.

== History ==
Hamakazumi Station was opened on 14 December 1935.

== Adjacent stations ==
«	Service	»
Toyama Chihō Railway Main Line
Limited Express: Does not stop at this station
Rapid Express: Does not stop at this station
Express: Does not stop at this station
Namerikawa	Local	Hayatsukikazumi

== Surrounding area ==
The station is located in a residential area.

== See also ==
- List of railway stations in Japan
