= Akihiro Murata =

Japanese shogi player (born 1986)

- Native name: 村田顕弘
- Born: July 14, 1986 (age 40)
- Hometown: Uozu, Toyama

Career
- Achieved professional status: October 1, 2007 (aged 21)
- Badge number: 267
- Rank: 6-dan
- Teacher: Shōdō Nakada (7-dan)
- Meijin class: C1
- Ryūō class: 4

Websites
- JSA profile page

Akihiro Murata (村田 顕弘, Murata Akihiro; born July 14, 1986) is a Japanese professional shogi player ranked 6-dan.

== Early life and apprentice professional ==
Murata was born on July 14, 1986, in Uozu, Toyama. He learned how to play shogi when he was about five years old from his father. In 1998, Murata took the entrance exam for the Japan Shogi Association's apprentice school, but failed; he tried again the following year and was accepted at the rank of 6-kyū under the guidance of shogi professional Shōdō Nakada.

Murata was promoted to the rank of 3-dan in 2004 at the age of eighteen, and obtained full professional status and the rank of 4-dan three years later after winning the 41st 3-dan League with a record of 15 wins and 3 losses.

== Shogi professional ==
=== Promotion history ===
Murata's promotion history is as follows:

- 6-kyū: September 1999
- 4-dan: October 1, 2007
- 5-dan: March 6, 2012
- 6-dan: November 7, 2017
