= Uozu Aquarium =

Japanese aquarium

Uozu Aquarium (魚津水族館
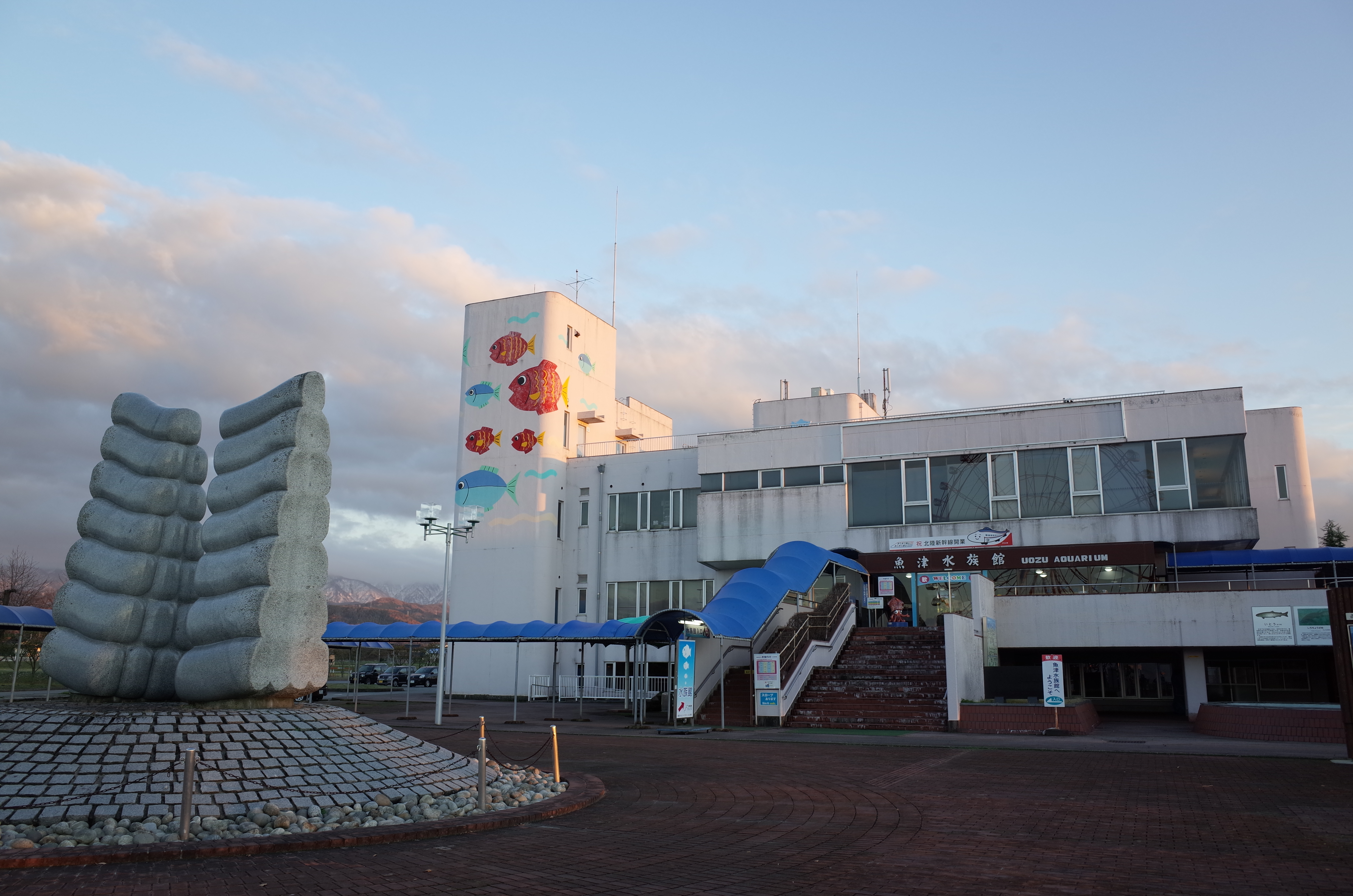
- Uozu Aquarium
- Interactive map of Uozu Aquarium (魚津水族館
- 36.7985°N 137.3881°E
- Date opened: September 21, 1914
- Location: Uozu, Toyama
- No. of animals: Around 10,000
- No. of species: Around 330
- Volume of largest tank: Toyama Bay Giant Tank 240,000 litres (63,000 US gal)
- Total volume of tanks: 450,000 litres (119,000 US gal)
- Website: English website

Uozu Aquarium (魚津水族館, Uozu Suizokukan) is an aquarium in Uozu, Toyama Prefecture, Japan. Opened on the 21st of September 1913, it claims to be the oldest aquarium in Japan still open.

The aquarium is accredited as a Registered Museum by the Museum Act from Ministry of Education, Culture, Sports, Science and Technology.

== History ==
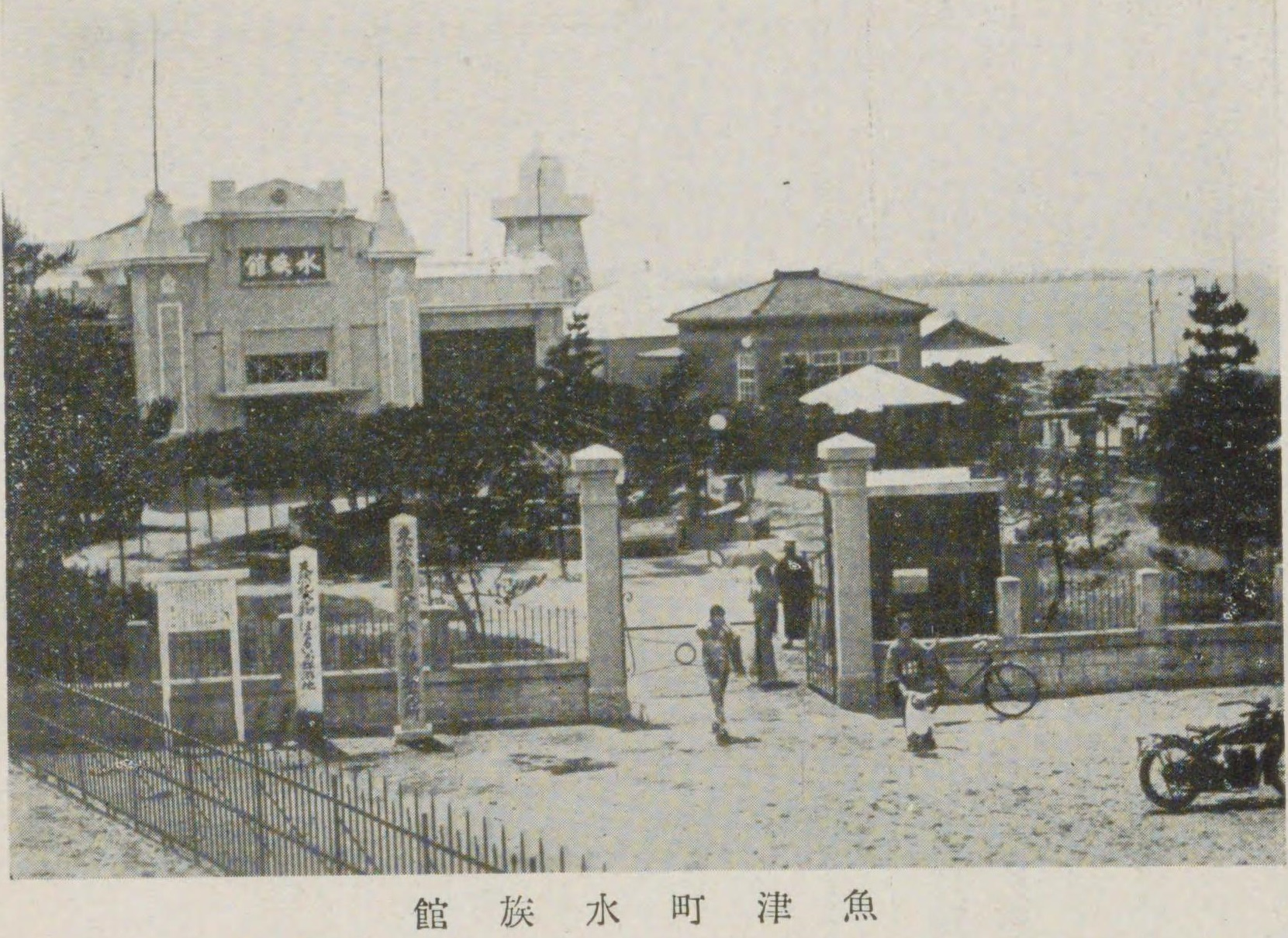
Uozu Aquarium before the war

The aquarium was established as a venue for the 1913 Eight Prefectures Exhibition in what was then Uozu town of Shimoniikawa District, and was officially opened on the 21st of September, 1913, making it the first aquarium to open on the coast of the Sea of Japan. In May 1914 it would be sold to Uozu town. Due to the Pacific War, the aquarium closed in March 1944 to be used as a fish processing plant.

In 1914, a loss of power lead to the discovery that the Japanese pineapplefish contains luminescent bacteria on each side of its jaw.

In 1953, for the Toyama Industrial Exposition, the decision was made to re-establish an aquarium on the site. Despite opposition from the fishing industry in the area, and several other areas submitting bids to host the aquarium, construction on the original site began in September 1953 and was finished by April 1954.

The current aquarium was opened on the 10th of April, 1981. Also in 1981, the building, designed by the Uozu City Environmental Design Office, won an architectural award, presented by the Toyama Society of Architects and Building Engineers.

== Shark Tunnel ==
Uozu Aquarium features the first shark tunnel to be built in Japan. It runs through the length of the Toyama Bay Giant Tank.

In 2013, in the 100th anniversary of an aquarium on the site, a sign was placed at the entrances to the tunnel proclaiming it as the first such acrylic glass aquarium tunnel in the world.

== Exhibits ==
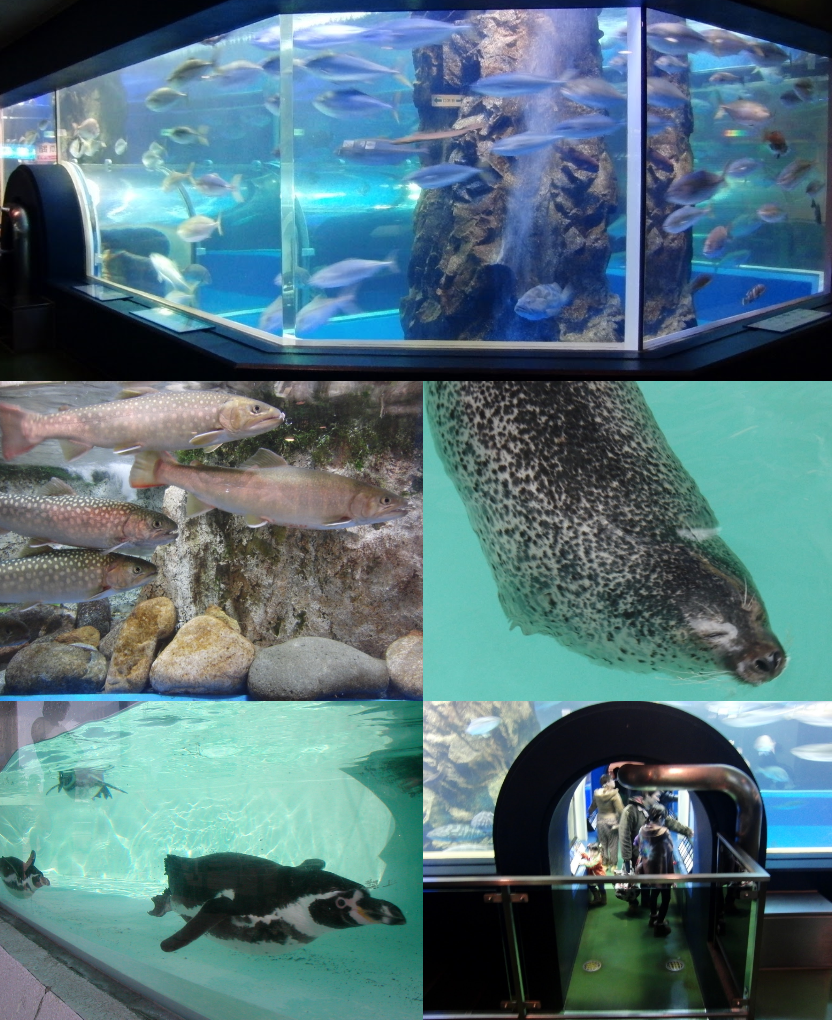
Aquarium pictures

- The Rivers of Toyama
- Biodiversity in Rice Fields
- Toyama Bay Deep Sea
- Toyama Bay Surface Layer
- Toyama Bay Giant Tank
- Jungle Ecosystem
- Coral Reef Area
- Penguin Pool

== Facilities ==
- Uosui Famirium
- Backstage Corner
- Touch Pool
