= JR Shikoku 1000 series =

Japanese diesel multiple unit train type

1000 series
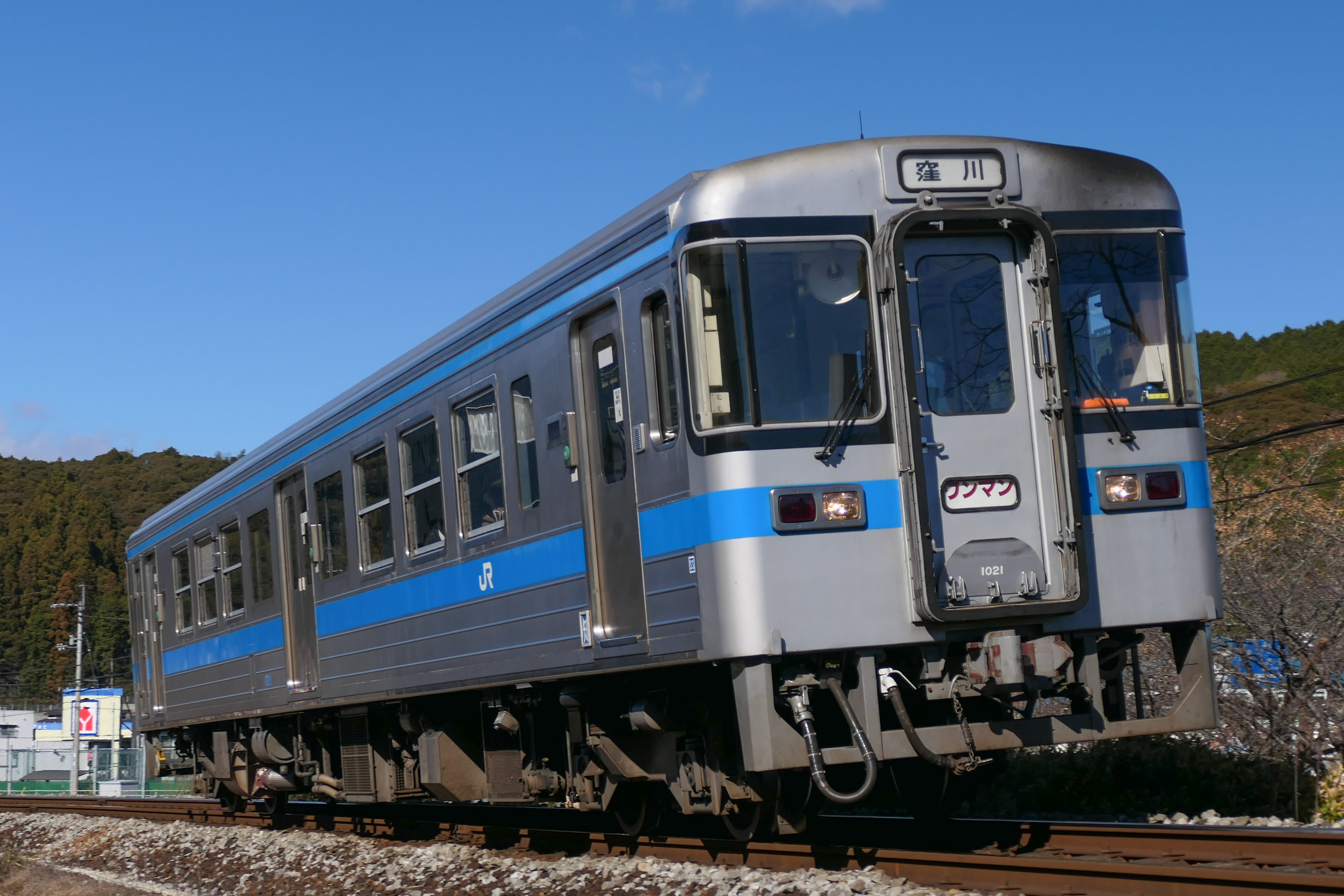
- Car number 1021, December 2021
- In service: 1990–Present
- Manufacturer: Niigata Transys
- Constructed: 1990–1997
- Number built: 56 vehicles
- Number in service: 38 vehicles
- Formation: Single car
- Capacity: 151 (70 seated)
- Operator: JR Shikoku
- Depots: Kōchi, Tokushima
- Lines served: Kōtoku Line, Tokushima Line, Mugi Line, Dosan Line

Specifications
- Car body construction: Stainless steel
- Car length: 20,800 mm (68 ft 3 in)
- Width: 2,800 mm (9 ft 2 in)
- Height: 3,825 mm (12 ft 6.6 in)
- Doors: Three per side
- Maximum speed: 110 km/h (68 mph)
- Weight: 31.5 t
- Prime mover: SA6D125-H (x1)
- Power output: 400 ps (at 2,100 rpm)
- Bogies: S-DT57/S-TR57
- Track gauge: 1,067 mm (3 ft 6 in)

The 1000 series (1000形) is a single-car diesel multiple unit (DMU) train type operated on local regional services by Shikoku Railway Company (JR Shikoku) in Japan since 1990.

== Operations ==
The 1000 series trains are used on the following JR Shikoku lines.

- Kōtoku Line
- Tokushima Line
- Mugi Line
- Dosan Line

== Build details and variants ==
A total of 56 1000 series cars were built by Niigata Transys between 1990 and 1997, delivered in four batches as shown below.

Batch	Vehicle numbers	Build date
1	1001–1028	1990
2	1029–1048	1992
3	1049–1050	1995
4	1051–1056	1997

== Interior ==
Passenger accommodation consists of a mixture of longitudinal bench seating on one side and transverse seating bays on the opposite side. Toilets have been retro-fitted to a number of cars since February 2001.

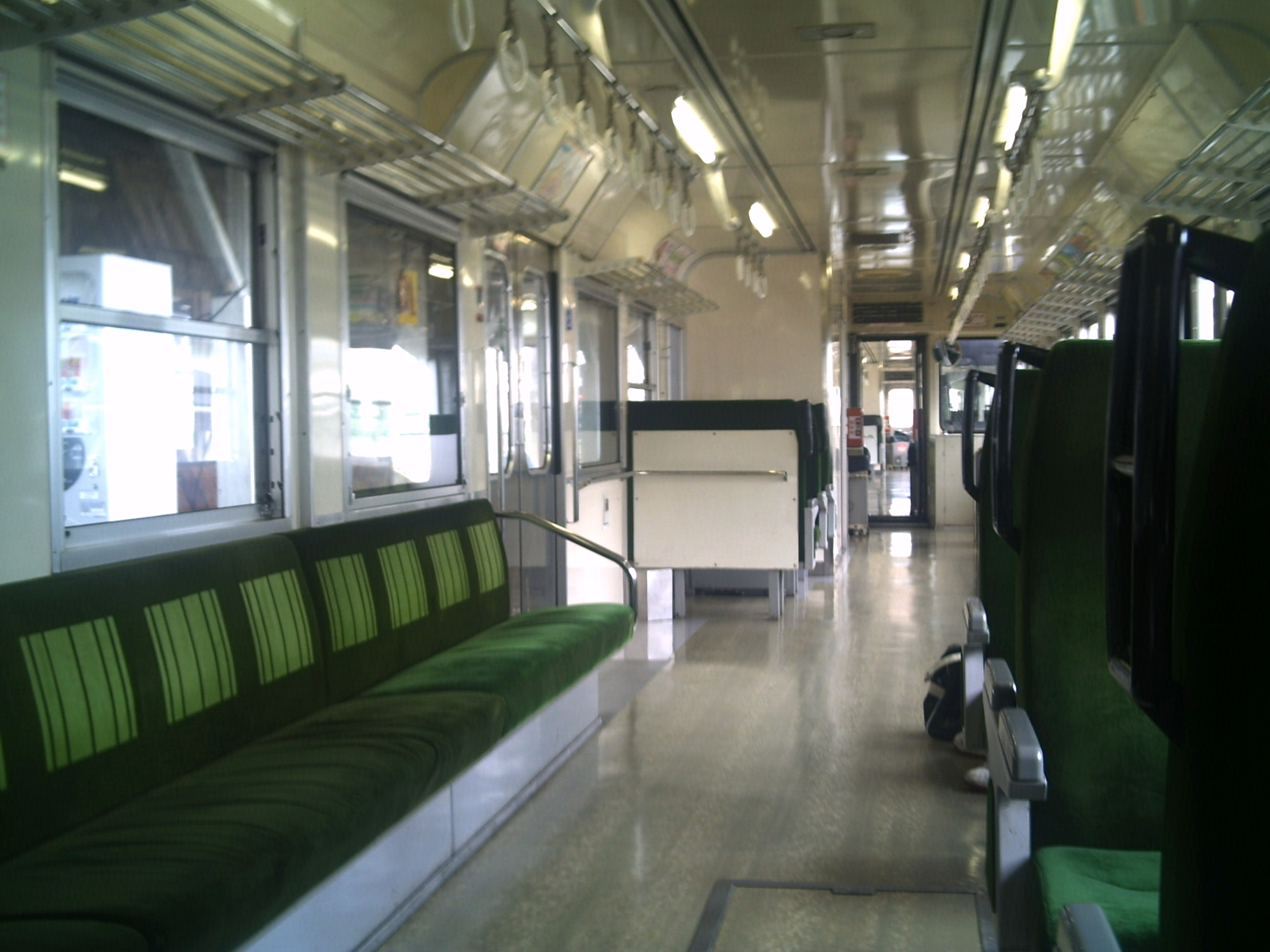
Interior view, July 2007

== History ==
In 2008, 18 1000 series cars were modified to make them compatible with newly delivered 1500 series DMU cars, and were reclassified as 1200 series.
