= KiHa 160 =

Japanese train type

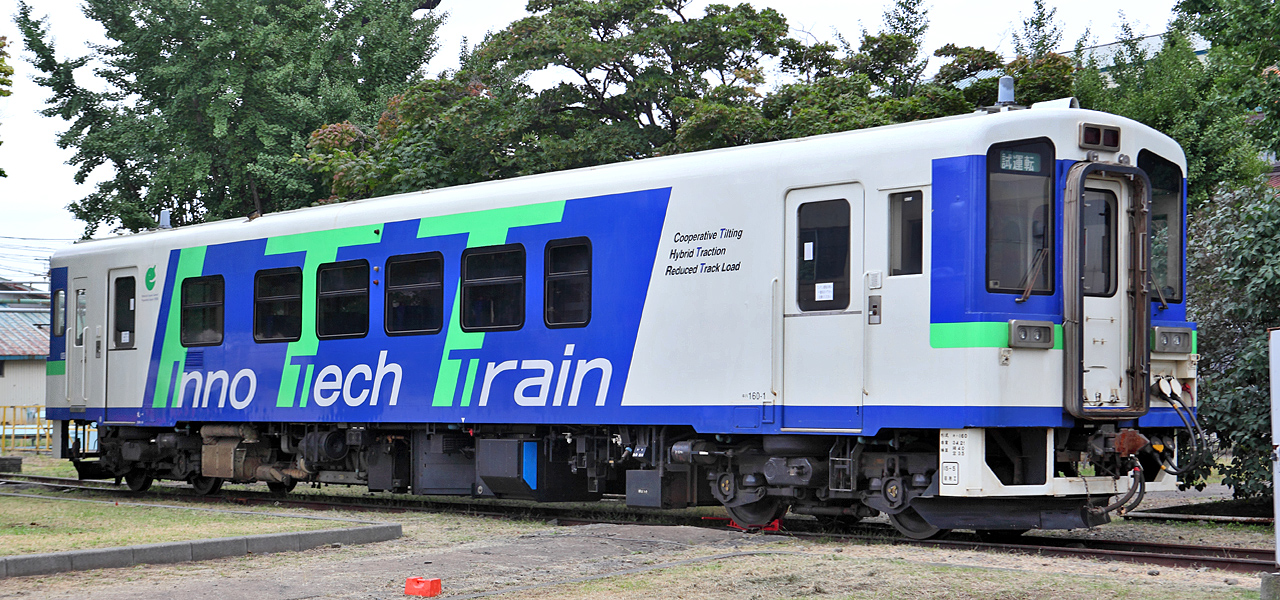
- KiHa 160-1 as the "Inno Tech Train" in September 2010
- In service: 1 June 1997 – 2013
- Manufacturer: Niigata Tekko
- Constructed: 1997
- Refurbished: 2007
- Scrapped: 2013
- Number built: 1 vehicle
- Number in service: None
- Formation: Single car
- Fleet numbers: KiHa 160-1
- Capacity: 110 (42 seated)
- Operator: JR Hokkaido
- Depot: Tomakomai
- Line served: Hidaka Main Line

Specifications
- Car body construction: Steel
- Car length: 18,500 mm (60 ft 8 in)
- Width: 2,700 mm (8 ft 10 in)
- Height: 3,620 mm (11 ft 11 in)
- Doors: 2 sliding doors per side
- Maximum speed: 110 km/h (70 mph)
- Weight: 32.5 t
- Prime mover: N-DMF13HZ
- Power output: 330 hp (250 kW)
- Transmission: Hydraulic
- Bogies: N-DT150 (motored), N-TR150 (trailer)
- Multiple working: KiHa 130
- Track gauge: 1,067 mm (3 ft 6 in)

The KiHa 160 (キハ160形) was a single-car diesel multiple unit (DMU) train operated by Hokkaido Railway Company (JR Hokkaido) on the Hidaka Main Line in Japan. A single car was built in 1997 by Niigata Tekko (now Niigata Transys) to replace the KiHa 130 DMU car (KiHa 130-5) withdrawn due to collision damage sustained in a level crossing accident in January 1996. From 2007, the unit was rebuilt as an experimental hybrid car, branded "Inno Tech Train", before being finally withdrawn in fiscal 2013.

== Design ==
The design was based on the Tsugaru Railway 21 series DMU built to Niigata's "NDC" lightweight design. As with the KiHa 150-100 cars, the KiHa 160 had inward-opening hopper windows.

When delivered, the unit was originally painted in a similar livery to the KiHa 150-0 units, with light green doors, a light green waistline band, and light purple stripes. From September 1999, it was repainted into a new livery similar to the KiHa 40-350 DMUs transferred to the Hidaka Line on which the KiHa 160 was used.

Internally, the car had fixed 2+1 facing transverse seating bays, with longitudinal bench seating next to the doorways.

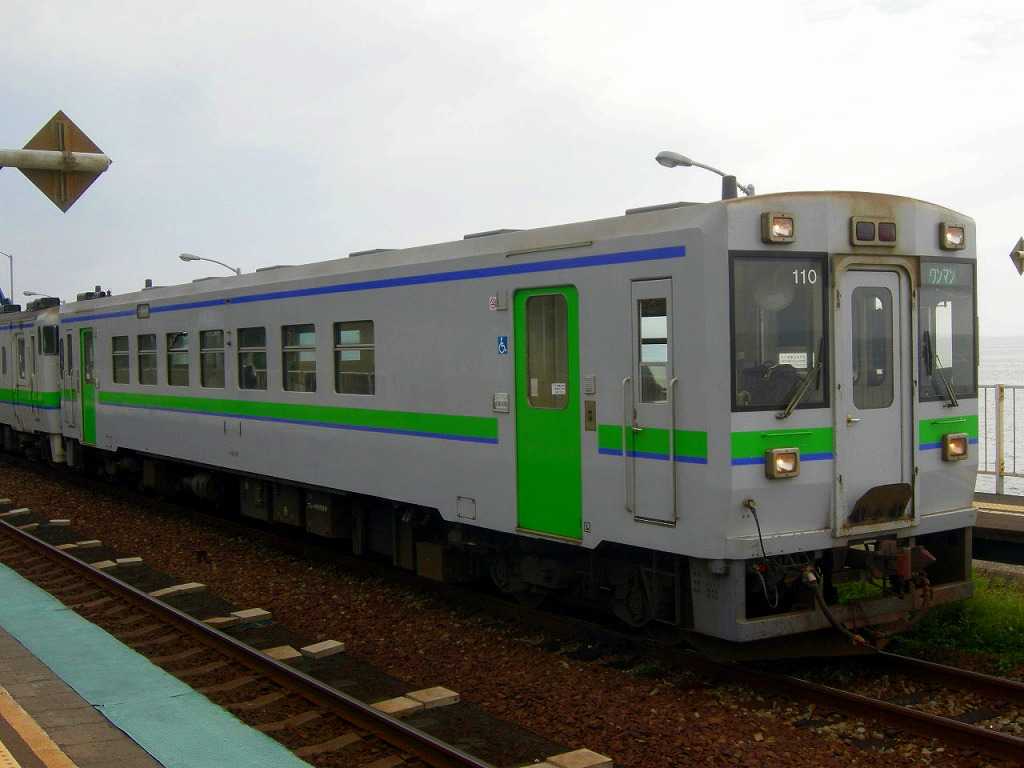
A JR Hokkaido KiHa 150-100 series DMU car in September 2008, showing the same livery as initially carried by Kiha 160-1

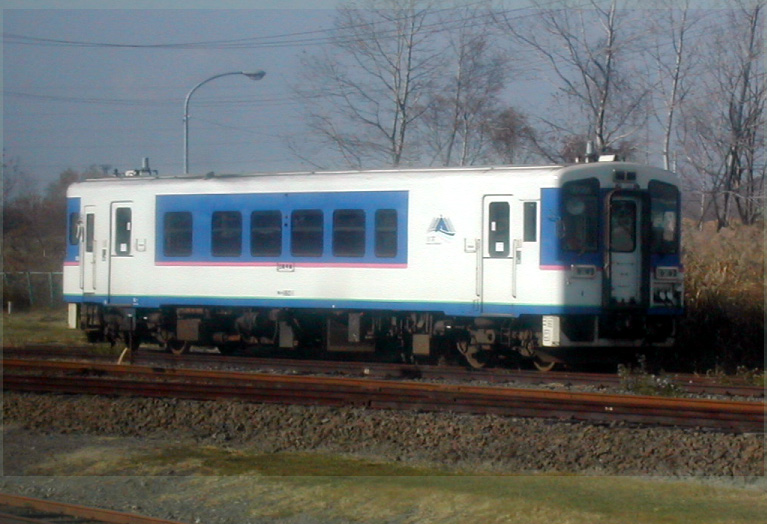
KiHa 160-1 at Tomakomai Station in revised livery before rebuilding

== History ==
KiHa 160-1 entered revenue service on the Hidaka Main Line on 1 June 1997, used interchangeably with the KiHa 130 DMUs also used on the line.

In 2007, the unit was rebuilt as an experimental hybrid vehicle using a motor-assisted hybrid system. At the same time, the longitudinal bench seating was replaced with limited-express style transverse seating.

Following the completion of testing, the unit was placed in storage at Naebo Works, before being officially withdrawn in fiscal 2013.
