= JR Shikoku 1200 series =

Japanese train type

1200 series
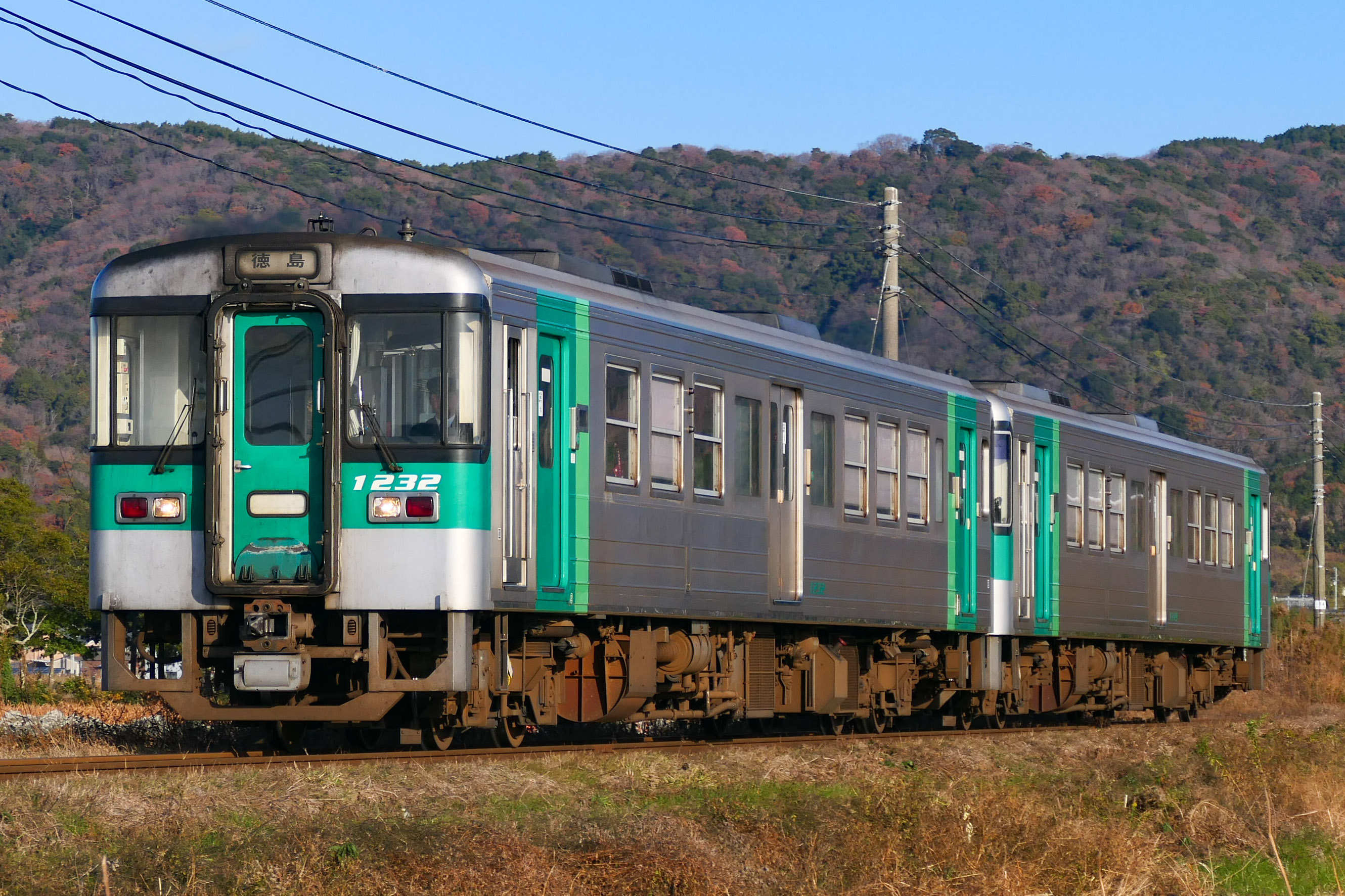
- Car number 1232 leading a local service, December 2024
- In service: 2008–present
- Manufacturer: Niigata Transys
- Constructed: 1992–1997
- Number built: 18 vehicles
- Number in service: 18 vehicles
- Formation: Single car
- Capacity: 143 (55 seated)
- Operator: JR Shikoku
- Depot: Tokushima
- Lines served: Kōtoku Line, Tokushima Line, Mugi Line, Dosan Line

Specifications
- Car body construction: Stainless steel
- Car length: 20,800 mm (68 ft 3 in)
- Width: 2,800 mm (9 ft 2 in)
- Height: 3,825 mm (12 ft 6.6 in)
- Doors: Three per side
- Maximum speed: 110 km/h (68 mph)
- Weight: 32.3 t
- Prime mover: SA6D125-H (x1)
- Power output: 400 ps (at 2,100 rpm)
- Bogies: S-DT57/S-TR57
- Multiple working: 1500 series
- Track gauge: 1,067 mm (3 ft 6 in)

The 1200 series (1200形) is a single-car diesel multiple unit (DMU) train type operated on local regional services by Shikoku Railway Company (JR Shikoku) in Japan since 2008. The fleet of 18 cars was converted from former 1000 series DMU cars to allow operation in conjunction with newly delivered 1500 series DMU cars.

== Operations ==
The 1200 series trains are used on the following JR Shikoku lines.

- Kōtoku Line
- Tokushima Line
- Mugi Line
- Dosan Line

== Interior ==
As with the 1000 series cars, passenger accommodation consists of a mixture of longitudinal bench seating on one side and transverse seating bays on the opposite side. All of the 1200 series cars have toilets.

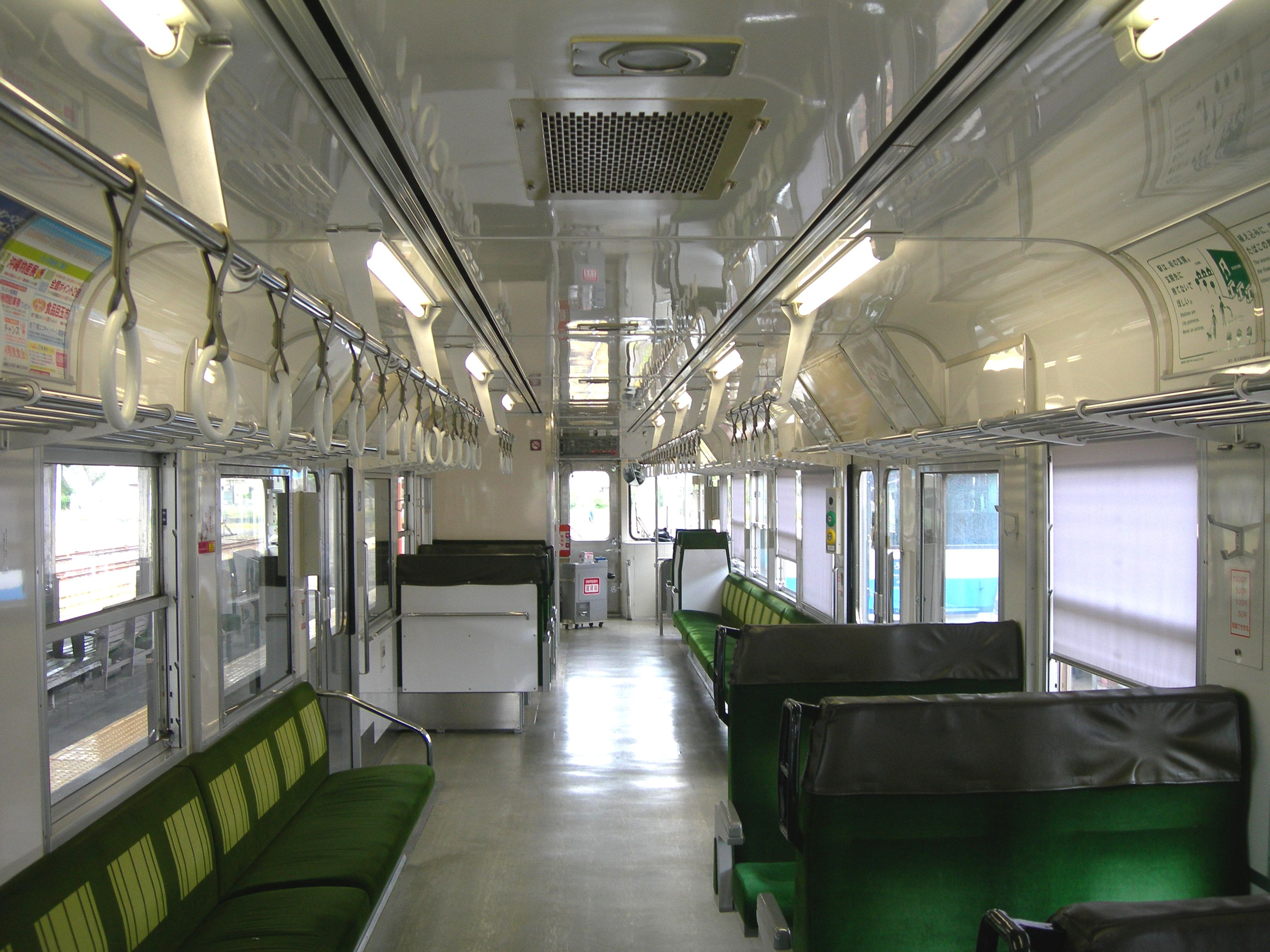
Interior view, May 2010

== History ==
Between June and October 2008, 18 former 1000 series cars, themselves built between 1992 and 1997 were modified to make them compatible with newly delivered 1500 series DMU cars. They were also repainted in a new livery of unpainted stainless steel with green highlights on the driving cab ends and passenger doorways.
