= 1500 series =

1500 series may refer to the following Japanese train types:

- JR Shikoku 1500 series diesel multiple unit train
- Keikyu 1500 series electric multiple unit train
- 1500 subseries of the Tokyu 1000 series electric multiple unit train
