= KiHa 122 series =

Japanese train type

KiHa 122/127 series
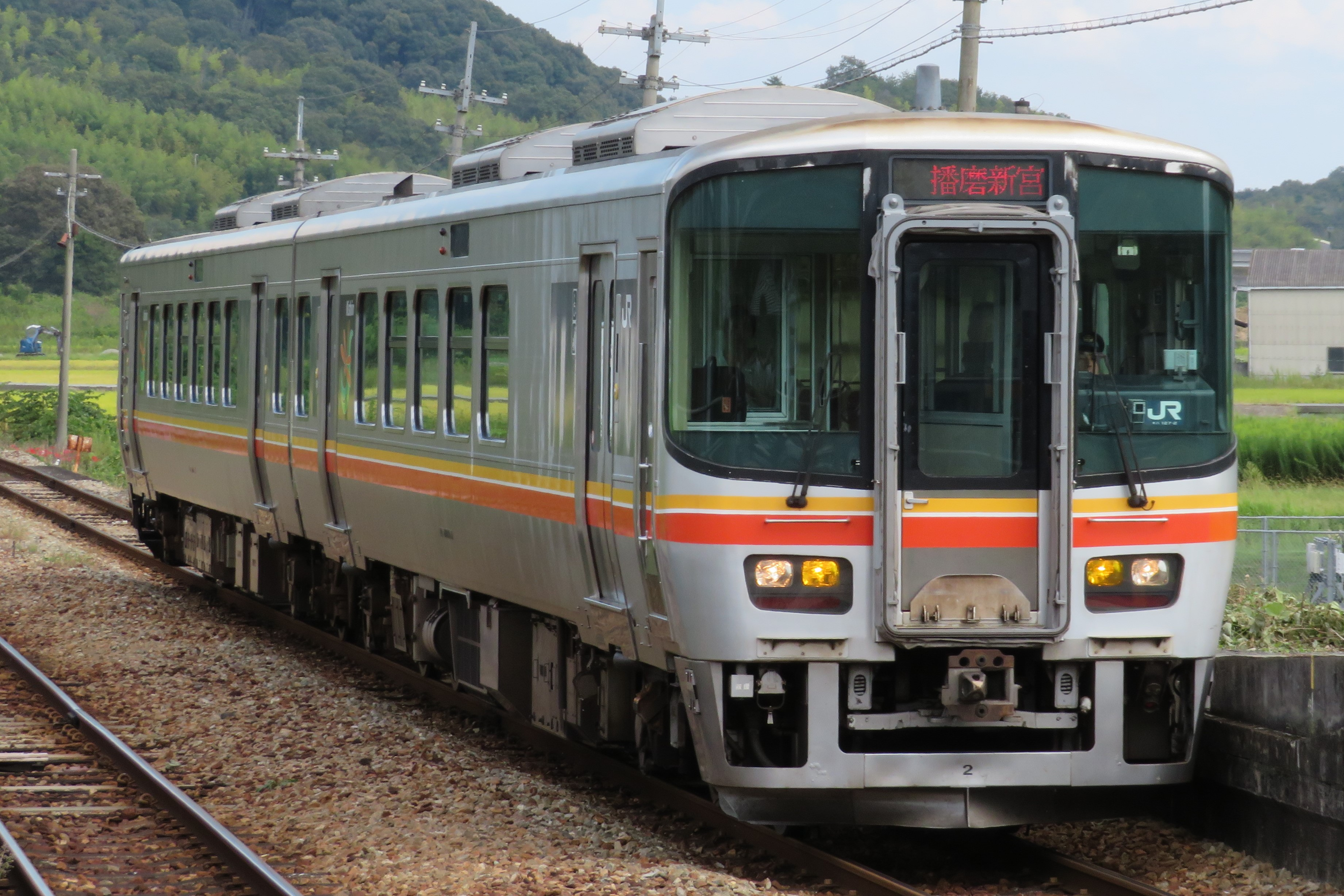
- KiHa 127 series 2-car DMU near Oichi Station in September 2019
- Manufacturer: Niigata Transys
- Constructed: 2008–2009
- Entered service: 2009
- Number built: 19 vehicles; 7 × KiHa 122; 6 × KiHa 127
- Number in service: 19 vehicles
- Formation: KiHa 122: Single car unit; KiHa 127: 2 cars per unit
- Capacity: KiHa 122: 113 (33 seated); KiHa 127: 268 (92 seated)
- Operator: JR-West
- Depot: Himeji
- Line served: K Kishin Line

Specifications
- Car body construction: Stainless steel
- Car length: KiHa 122: 20,440 mm (67 ft 1 in); KiHa 127: 20,270 mm (66 ft 6 in)
- Width: 2,900 mm (9 ft 6 in)
- Height: 4,040 mm (13 ft 3 in)
- Doors: Two pairs per side
- Maximum speed: 100 km/h (62 mph)
- Prime mover: SA6D140HE-2
- Power output: Per engine: 331 kW (444 hp) at 2,100 rpm
- Transmission: Hydraulic
- HVAC: WAU707 ×2
- Bogies: WDT65 (driving), WTR248 (trailing)
- Braking systems: Engine brake, electronically controlled pneumatic brakes
- Safety system: ATS-SW
- Track gauge: 1,067 mm (3 ft 6 in)

The KiHa 122 series (キハ122系, Kiha-122-kei) and KiHa 127 series (キハ127系, Kiha-127-kei) are diesel multiple unit (DMU) train types operated by West Japan Railway Company (JR-West) on the Kishin Line between Himeji and Kōzuki. A total of 19 cars have been delivered, formed as seven single-car KiHa 122 series units and six two-car KiHa 127 series units. Test-running commenced in late September 2008, with the units entering revenue-earning service from the start of the revised timetable on 14 March 2009.

The "KiHa" designation derives from the classification system used by JNR. "Ki" indicates a diesel-powered vehicle, while "Ha" indicates an ordinary passenger car, as opposed to a green car.

== Exterior ==
The body design features improved crash resistance, based on the 223 series electric multiple unit design. The cars use environmentally-friendly diesel engines with reduced NOx and particulate emissions.

Externally, the units are finished in unpainted metal with thin yellow and red waistline stripes.

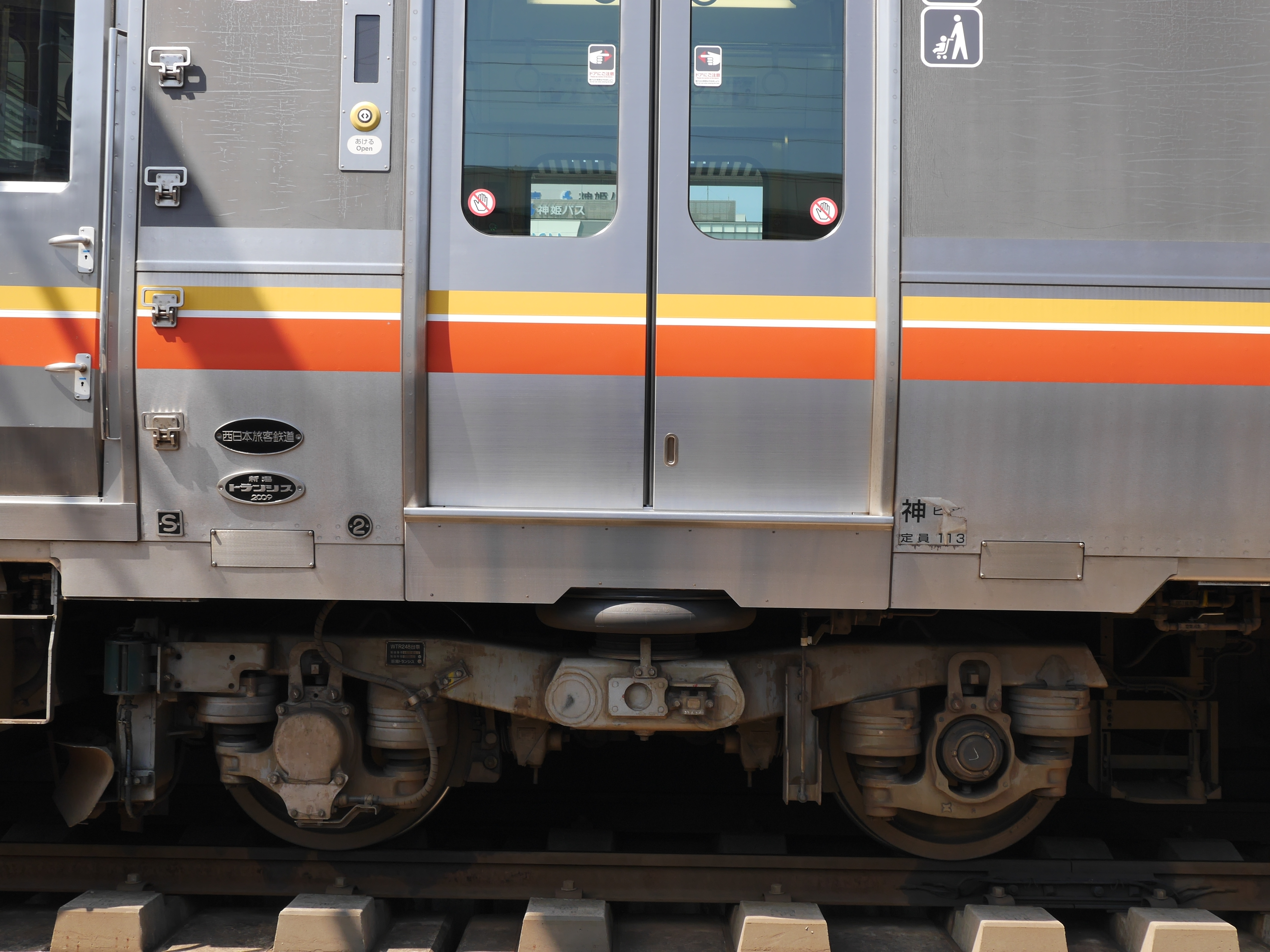
WTR248 trailer bogie

== Interior ==
Internally, the cars feature flip-over reversible seating arranged 2+1 abreast. Toilets in both types of train are wheelchair-accessible, and the step between the passenger compartment and station platform has been eliminated.

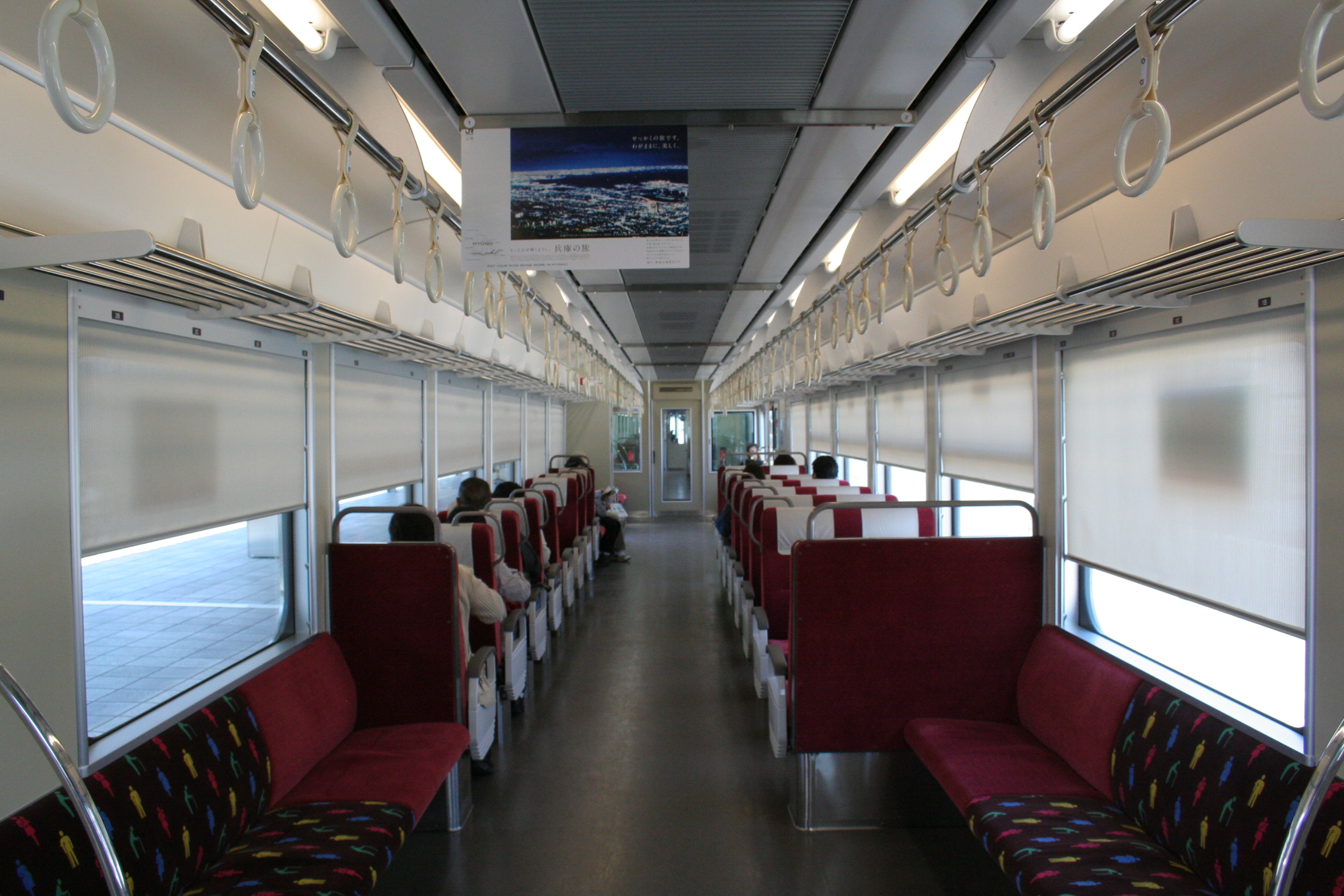
KiHa 127 interior

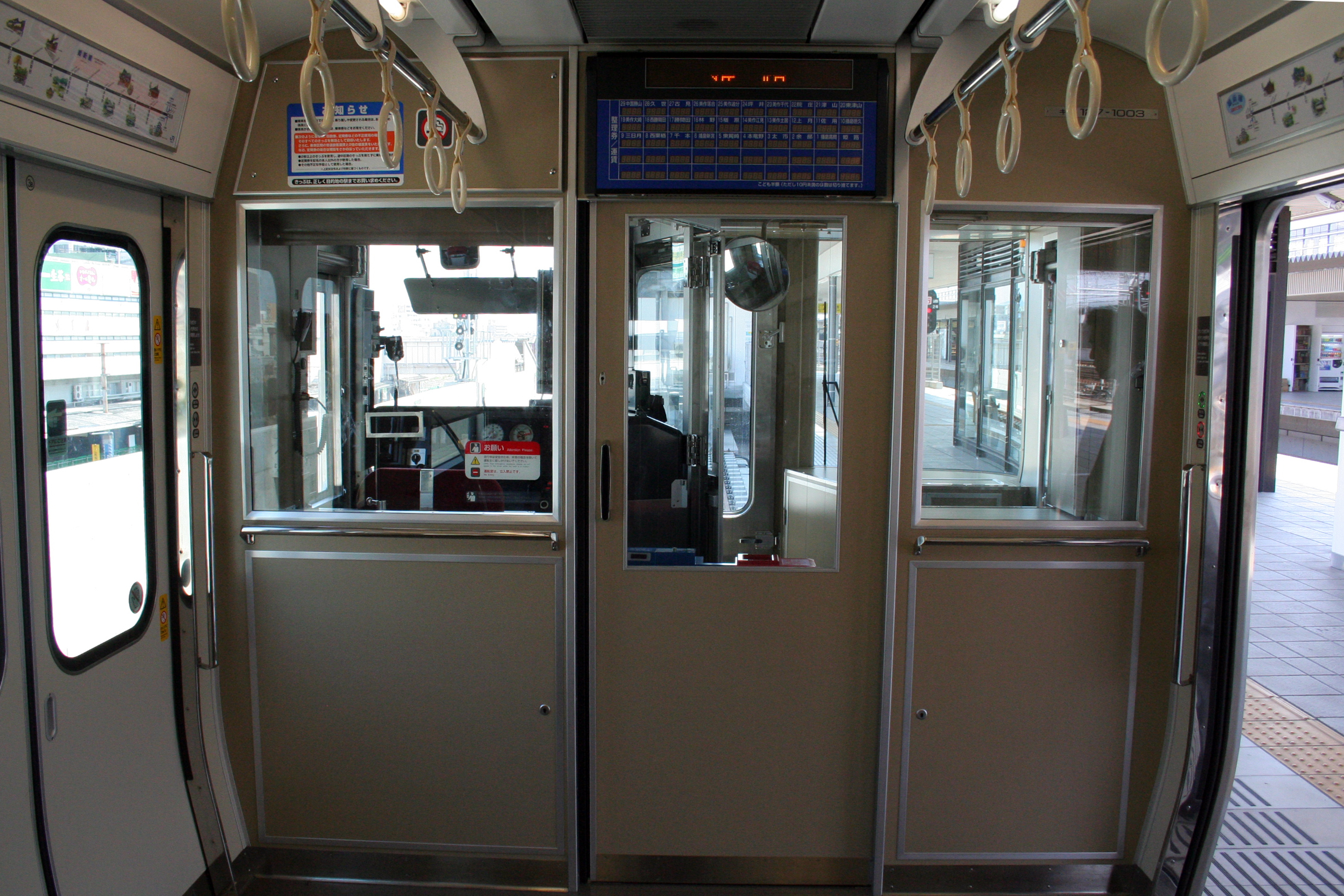
KiHa 127 forward view showing LED fare board for wanman driver-only operation

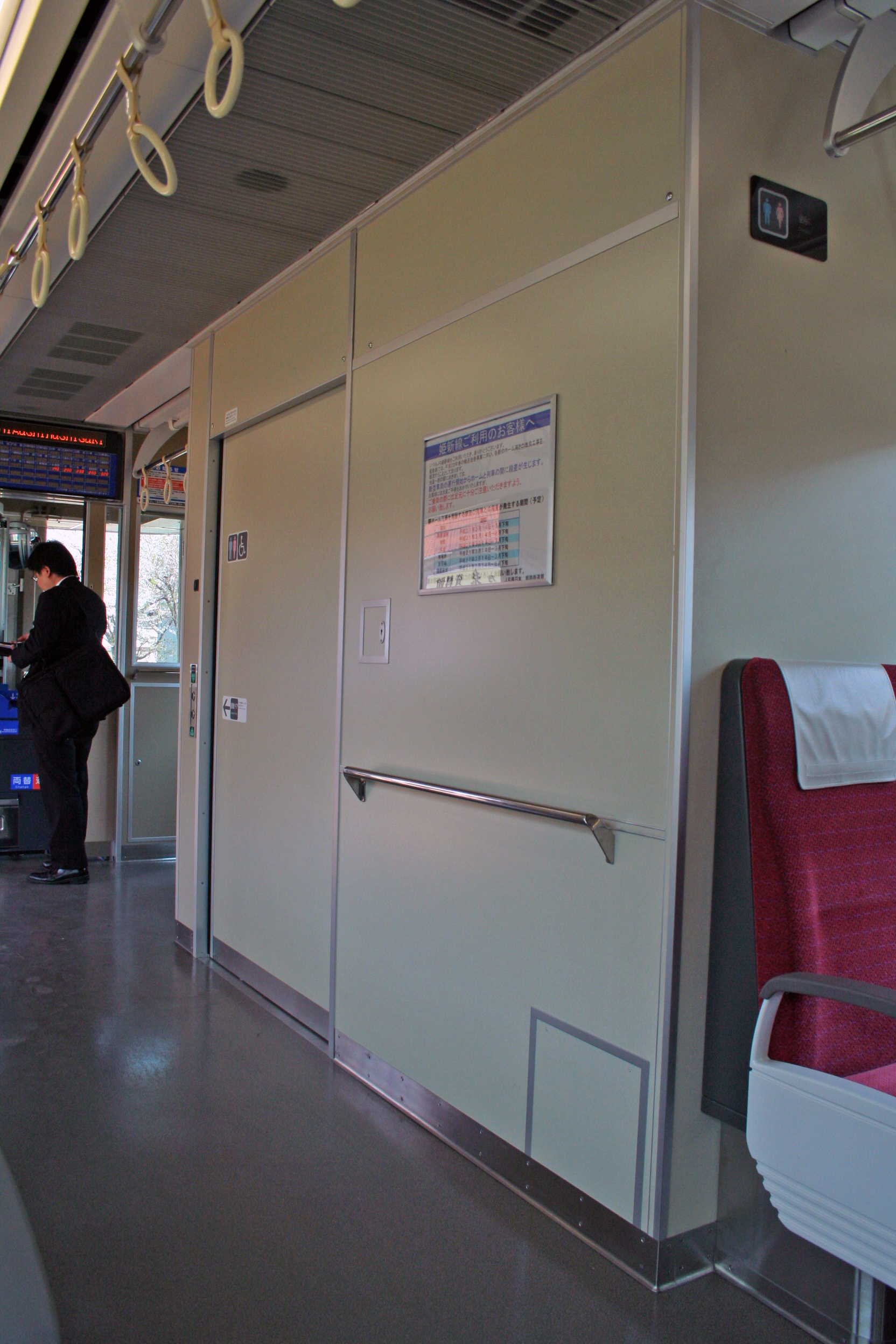
KiHa 127 toilet

== Formations ==
The KiHa 122 single-car units and KiHa 127 two-car units are formed as follows.

=== KiHa 122 series (single-car unit) ===
The KiHa 122 series uses a diesel engine with a small lithium-ion battery (18 kWh) that is used to power auxiliary machines in the train.

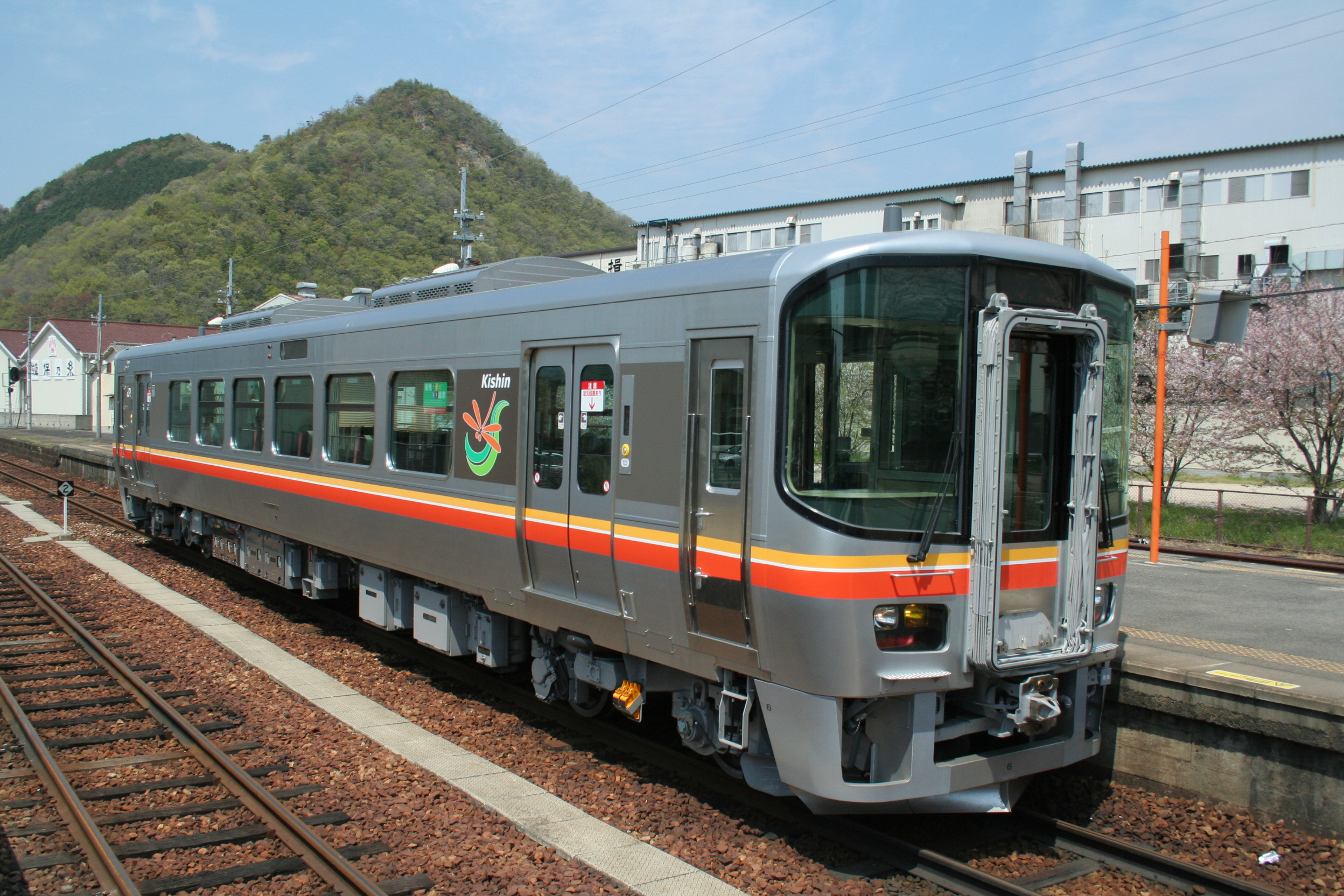
KiHa 122 series single-car unit at Harima-Shingu Station in April 2009

Designation	cMc
Numbering	KiHa 122-0
Weight (t)	40.5
Capacity Total/seated	113/33

(Equipped with toilet)

=== KiHa 127 series (2-car units) ===
Designation	Mc1	Mc2
Numbering	KiHa 127-0	KiHa 127-1000
Weight (t)	38.5	37.5
Capacity Total/seated	130/41	138/51

(KiHa 127-0 is equipped with a toilet.)

== Derivatives ==
- ET122, single-car DMUs for use on the third-sector Echigo Tokimeki Railway Nihonkai Hisui Line since March 2015
