= ET122 =

Japanese diesel multiple unit operated by the Echigo Tokimeki Railway

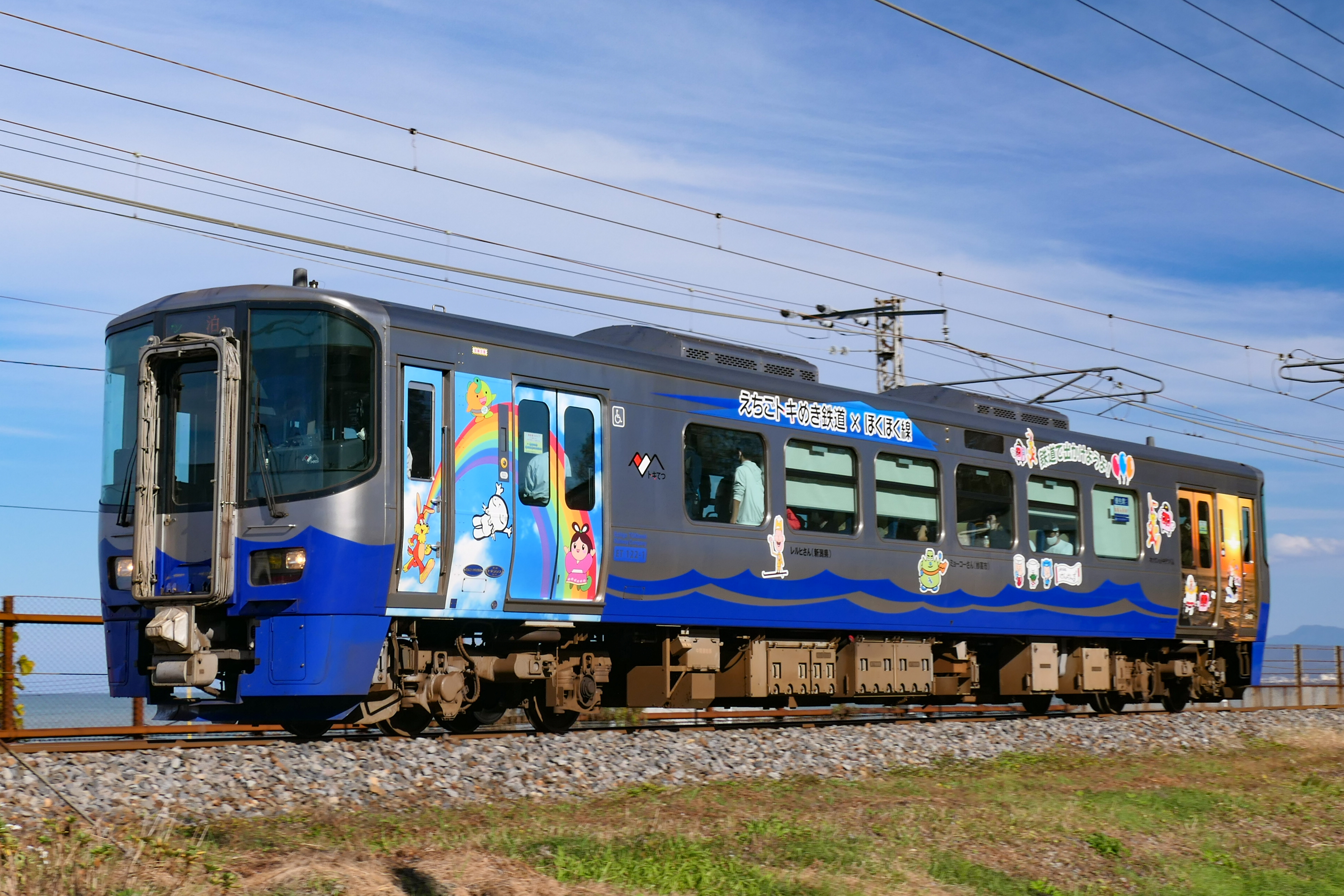
- ET122-1 in October 2021
- Manufacturer: Niigata Transys
- Constructed: 2014–2016
- Entered service: 14 March 2015
- Number built: 10 vehicles
- Number in service: 8 vehicles
- Formation: 1/2 cars per unit
- Fleet numbers: ET122-1 – ET122-8; ETT122-1001 – ET122-1002
- Operator: Echigo Tokimeki Railway
- Depot: Naoetsu
- Line served: Nihonkai Hisui Line

Specifications
- Car body construction: Stainless steel Steel (ET122-1000)
- Car length: 20,800 mm (68 ft 3 in)
- Width: 2,900 mm (9 ft 6 in)
- Height: 4,040 mm (13 ft 3 in)
- Floor height: 1,170 mm (3 ft 10 in)
- Doors: Two pairs per side
- Maximum speed: 100 km/h (60 mph)
- Prime mover: SA6D140HE-2
- Track gauge: 1,067 mm (3 ft 6 in)

The ET122 is a diesel multiple unit (DMU) train type operated by the third-sector railway operator Echigo Tokimeki Railway (ETR) on the Nihonkai Hisui Line between Naoetsu and Ichiburi in Niigata Prefecture since operations on the line were transferred from West Japan Railway Company (JR West) on 14 March 2015. Built by Niigata Transys and based on the JR West KiHa 122 series DMU design, the fleet consists of a total of eight single-car units.

== Variants ==
- Standard cars ET122-1 to ET122-6
- Special event cars ET122-7 and ET122-8
- Resort train Setsugekka ET122-1001 + ET122-1002

The fleet consists of six standard cars, numbered ET122-1 to ET122-6, and two special-event cars, numbered ET122-7 to ET122-8. The former have reversible transverse seating arranged 2+1 abreast with longitudinal bench seating at one end (total seating capacity 33), and the latter have fixed 4-person seating bays with tables (total seating capacity 40). Both types have a wheelchair space at one end and a universal access toilet.

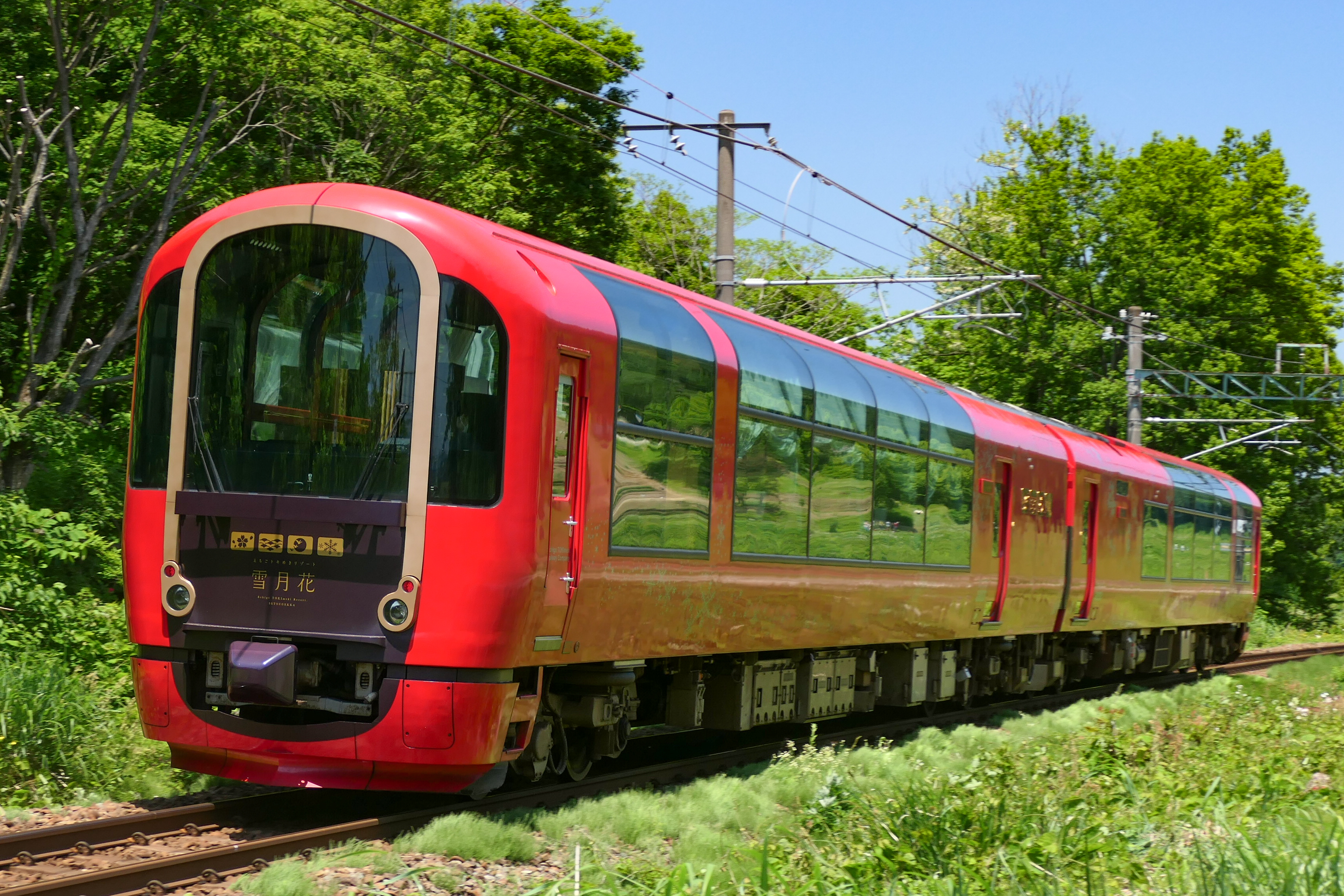
The ET122-1000 Setsugekka train in service in May 2022

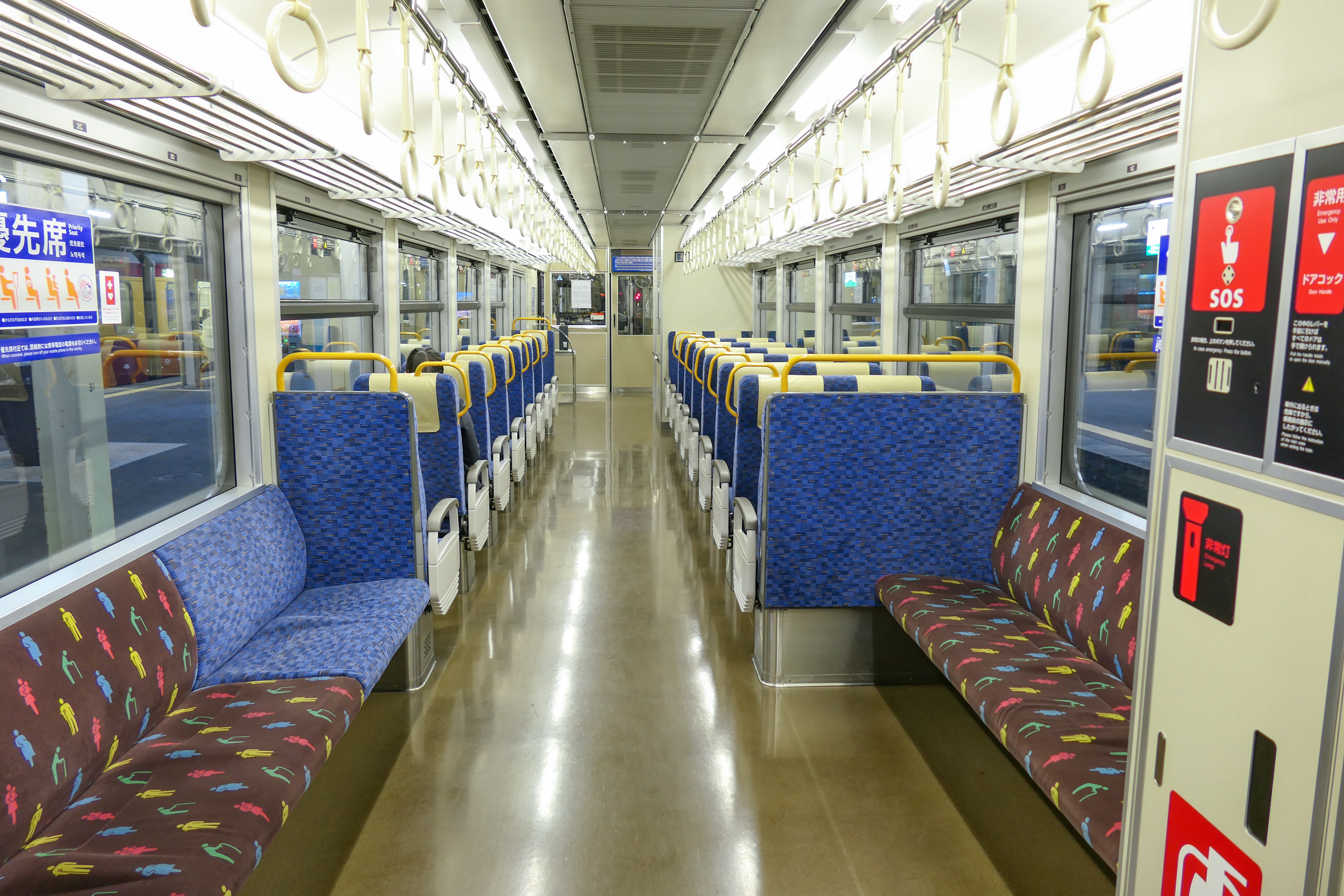
The interior of a standard car in October 2021

A two-car resort train classified ET122-1000 (cars ET122-1001 + ET122-1002) and branded Setsugekka (雪月花; lit. "Snow, Moon, Flowers") was built by Niigata Transys and delivered in March 2016. This trainset entered service on 23 April 2016, operating mainly at weekends.

== Operations ==
The trains normally operate on the ETR's Nihonkai Hisui Line between Naoetsu and Ichiburi in Niigata Prefecture, with through-running to and from Tomari on the Ainokaze Toyama Railway Line in Toyama Prefecture.

== Special liveries ==
The two special-event cars, ET122-7 and ET122-8, are finished in liveries designed by students at the Nagaoka Institute of Design. One is branded "Nihonkai Stream" and the other is branded "3 Cities Flowers".

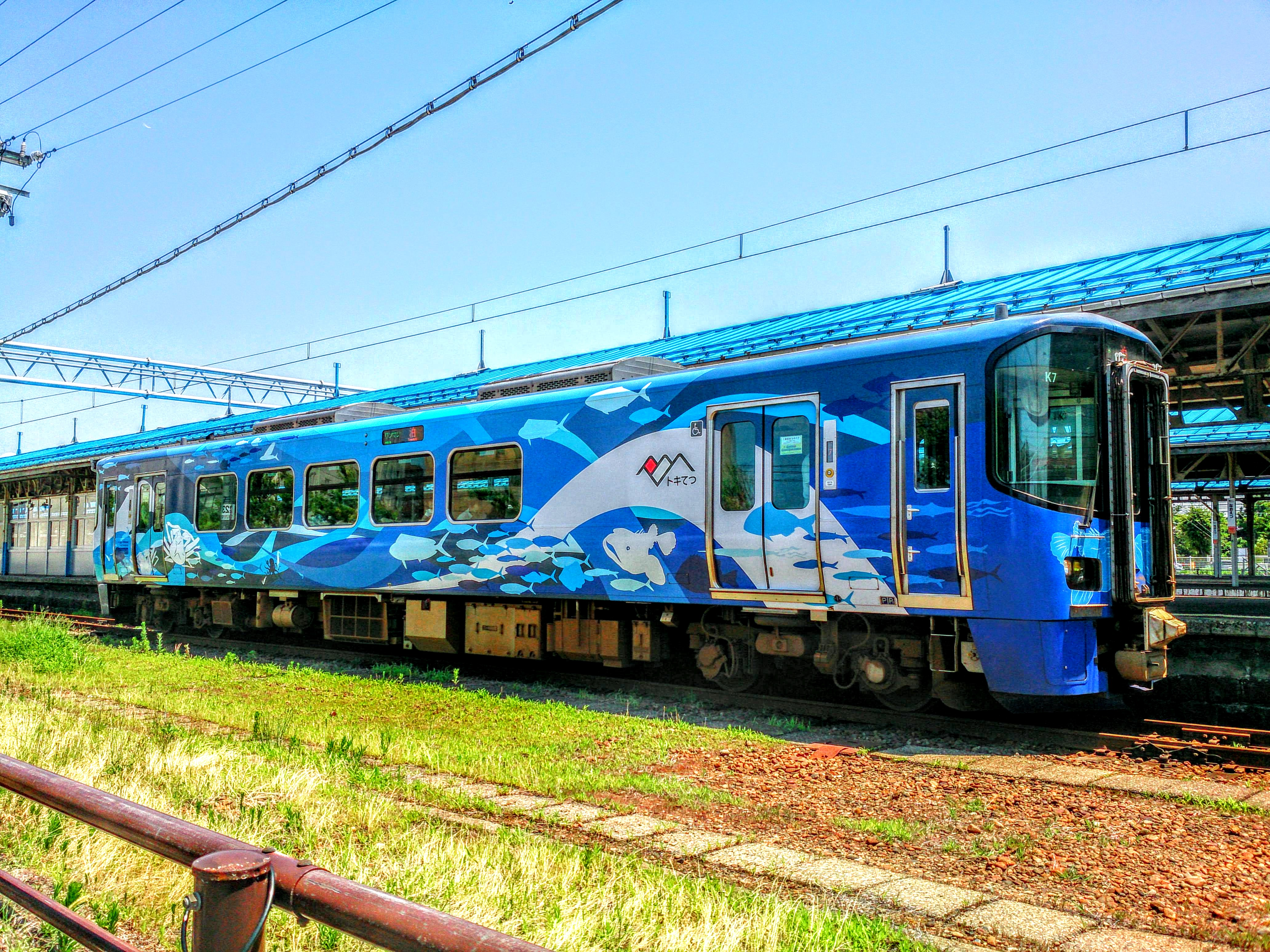
Special-event car ET122-7 in "Nihonkai Stream" livery in July 2018

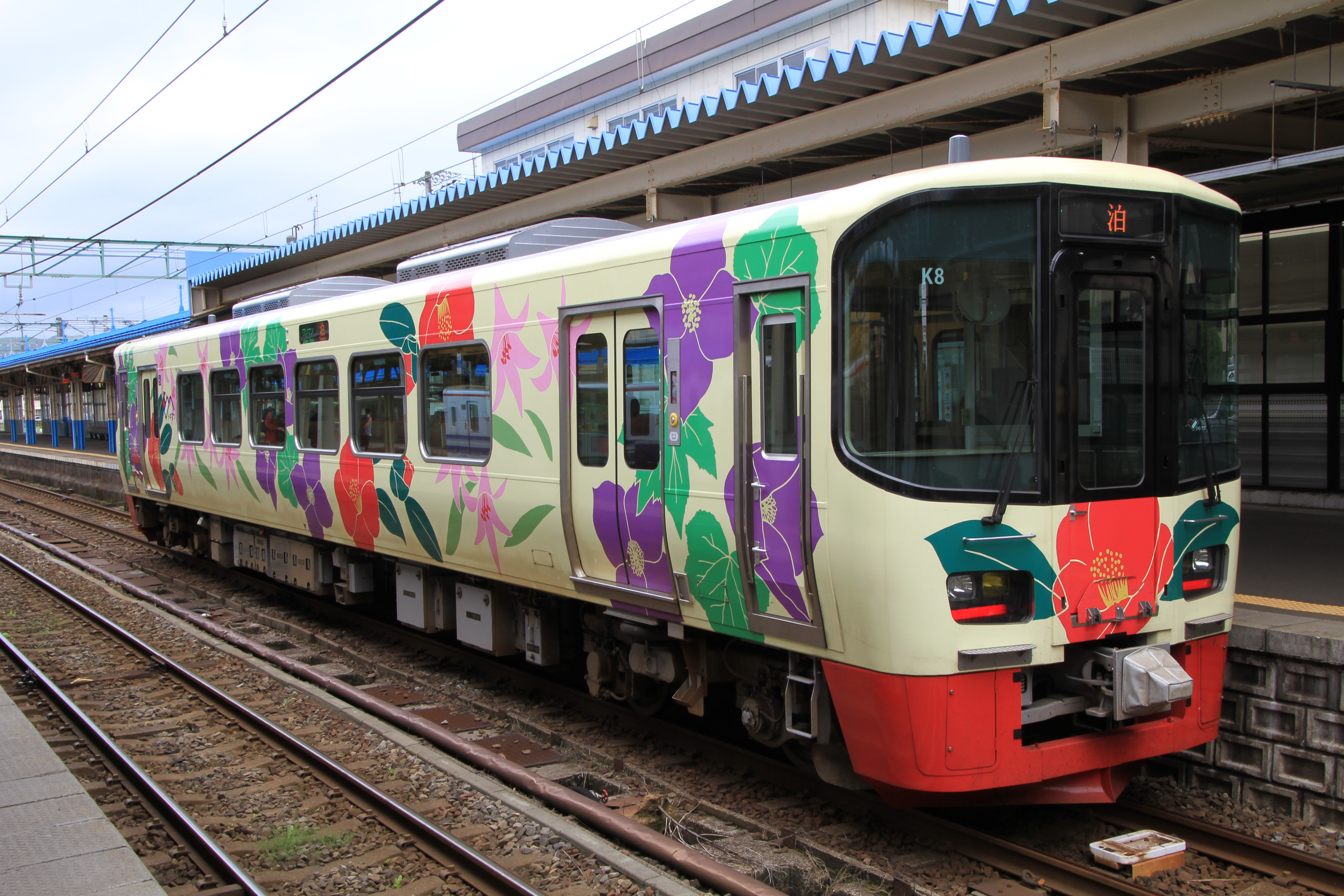
Special-event car ET122-8 in "3 Cities Flowers" livery in May 2015

== History ==
Test running began on the Hokuriku Main Line in December 2014. In May 2017, the ET122-1000 was awarded the 2017 Laurel Prize, presented annually by the Japan Railfan Club.

== Fleet details ==
The individual build histories are as follows.

| Car No. | Delivery date | Livery |
|---|---|---|
| ET122-1 | 20 October 2014 | Standard livery |
| ET122-2 | 20 October 2014 | Standard livery |
| ET122-3 | 3 March 2015 | Standard livery |
| ET122-4 | 19 January 2015 | Standard livery |
| ET122-5 | 19 January 2015 | Standard livery |
| ET122-6 | 19 January 2015 | Standard livery |
| ET122-7 | 19 January 2015 | "Nihonkai Stream" livery |
| ET122-8 | 19 January 2015 | "3 Cities Flowers" livery |
| ET122-1001 | March 2016 | Setsugekka resort train |
| ET122-1002 | March 2016 | Setsugekka resort train |
