= KiHa 130 =

Japanese train type

KiHa 130 series
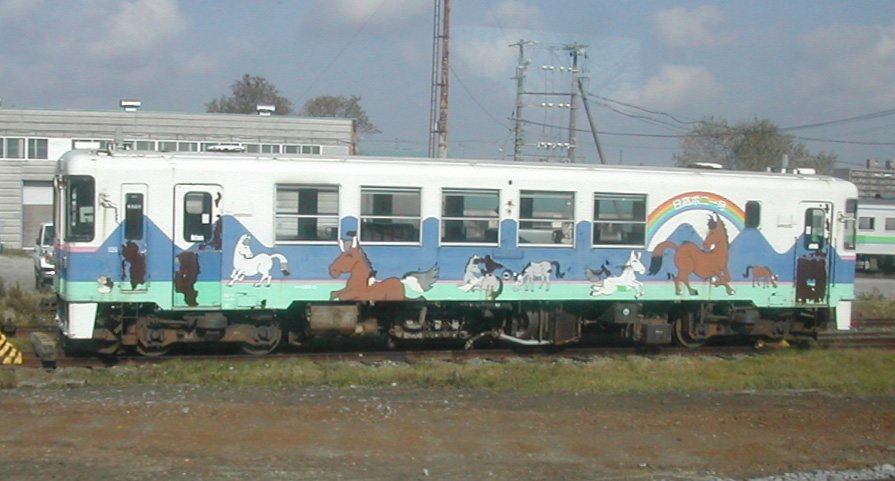
- A lone KiHa 130 train at Tomakomai station
- In service: 1988–2001
- Manufacturer: Niigata Tekkō
- Replaced: KiHa 22, KiHa 40
- Constructed: 1988–1989
- Entered service: November 1988
- Scrapped: 2002–2009
- Number built: 11 vehicles
- Number in service: None
- Number preserved: None
- Number scrapped: 11 vehicles
- Formation: 1/2 cars per trainset
- Fleet numbers: 1-11
- Capacity: 100
- Operator: JR Hokkaido (1988–2001)
- Line served: Hidaka Main Line

Specifications
- Car body construction: Stainless steel
- Car length: 15,800 mm (51 ft 10 in)
- Width: 2,700 mm (8 ft 10 in)
- Height: 4,000 mm (13 ft 1 in)
- Doors: One pair per side
- Maximum speed: 95 km/h (59 mph)
- Weight: 27.5 t
- Prime mover: DMF13HS x1 per car
- Power output: 189 kW (253 hp) per car
- Bogies: DT130 (motored), TR130 (trailer)
- Track gauge: 1,067 mm (3 ft 6 in)

The KiHa 130 series (キハ130系) was a class of diesel multiple unit (DMU) trains operated from November 1988 to June 2001 by the Hokkaido Railway Company (JR Hokkaido) on the Hidaka Main Line in Japan.

== History ==
They were built from 1988 to 1989 by Niigata Tekkō (now known as Niigata Transys), the KiHa 130 series cars were introduced as low-cost lightweight diesel railcars that could deal with the increased demand for rail transport in rural areas, in addition to replacing older diesel railcars such as the KiHa 22 and KiHa 40-100 series cars.

Eleven cars were produced, all by Niigata Tekkō, and were used exclusively on the Hidaka Main Line from their introduction on said line on 3 November 1988. However, problems with using these lightweight railcars began to show, with two cars being heavily damaged in accidents with level crossings in 1991 and 1996 respectively; car 5, the victim of the 1996 accident, was considered to be irreparable with most parts of the cars scrapped on site.

By 1999, however, the cars were considered to have aged sufficiently to be replaced, with all but one car, 8, being withdrawn from service in 2000. Car 8 was later painted in a Hidaka Pony paint scheme and was used for additional services on the Hidaka Main Line until it was retired on 17 June 2001.

No new diesel railcars were produced to replace the then-recently retired KiHa 130 series sets. Instead, older KiHa 40 series cars were selected to replace the KiHa 130 series cars on the Hidaka Main line, which is somewhat ironic as the KiHa 130 series cars were replaced by the railcars that it intended to replace.

No KiHa 130 series cars have been preserved.

== Design ==
The cars were based on Niigata Tekkō's NDC series of diesel railcars, so design language was carried over. The cars were painted white with green accents; there were Hidaka graphics on the sides of the cars.

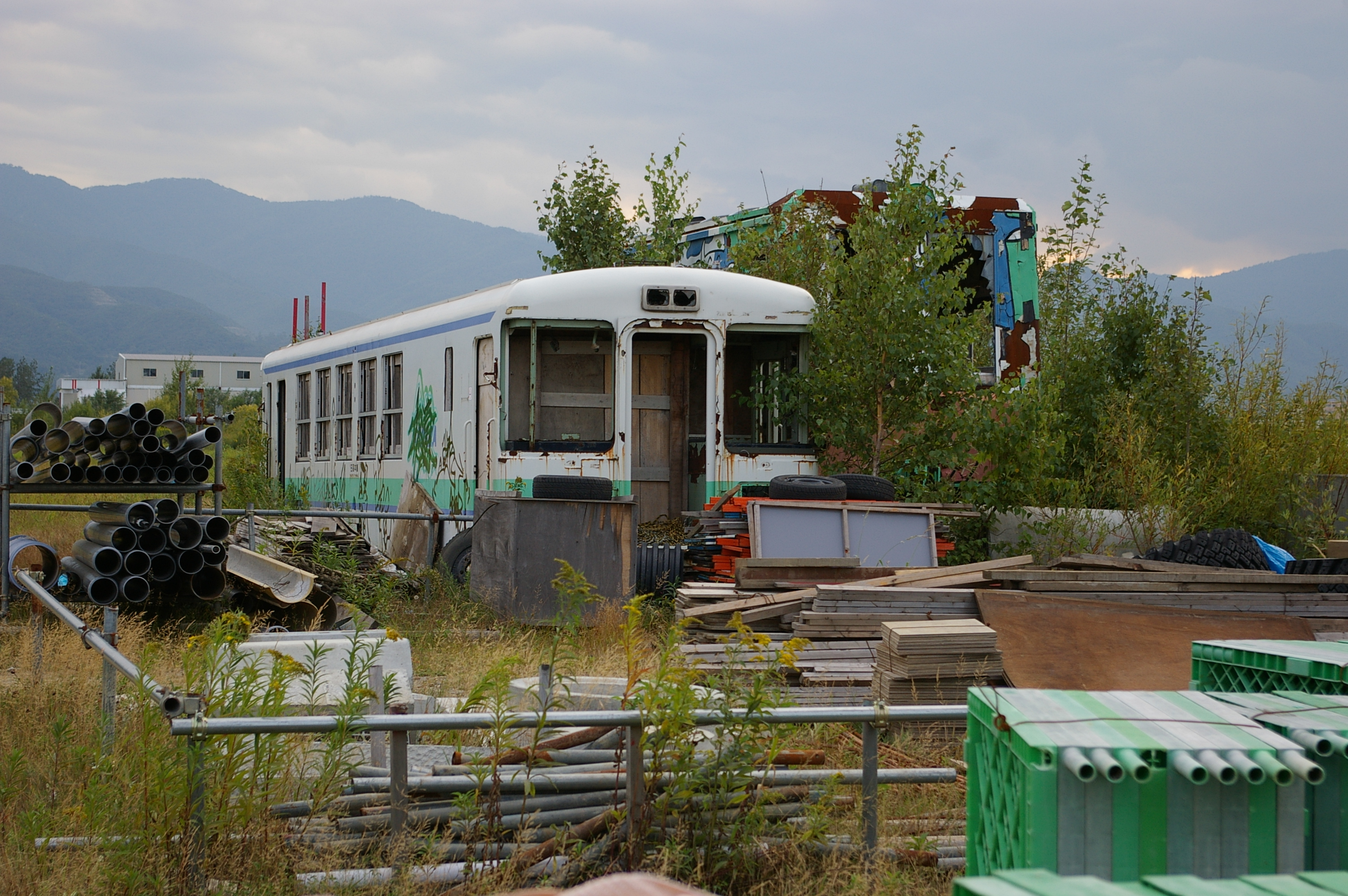
Abandoned KiHa 130-5 diesel railcar in Sapporo City in 2006.
