= JR Shikoku 1500 series =

Japanese train type

1500 series
- Car 1563 leading a 2-car formation, November 2026
- In service: May 2006–Present
- Manufacturers: Kinki Sharyo, Niigata Transys
- Replaced: KiHa 58, KiHa 65
- Constructed: 2006–2014
- Number built: 34 vehicles
- Number in service: 32 vehicles
- Formation: Single car
- Capacity: 121 (38 seated)
- Operator: JR Shikoku
- Depot: Tokushima
- Lines served: Kōtoku Line, Tokushima Line, Mugi Line

Specifications
- Car body construction: Stainless steel
- Car length: 20,800 mm (68 ft 3 in)
- Width: 2,900 mm (9 ft 6 in)
- Height: 3,560 mm (11 ft 8 in)
- Doors: Three per side
- Maximum speed: 110 km/h (68 mph)
- Prime mover: SA6D140HE-2 (x1)
- Power output: 450 hp (at 2,100 rpm)
- Bogies: S-DT65/S-TR65
- Multiple working: 1200 series
- Track gauge: 1,067 mm (3 ft 6 in)

The 1500 series (1500形) is a single-car diesel multiple unit (DMU) train type operated by Shikoku Railway Company (JR Shikoku) in Japan since 2006.

== Operations ==
The 1500 series trains are used on the following JR Shikoku lines.

- Kōtoku Line
- Tokushima Line
- Mugi Line

== Build details and variants ==
Batch	Vehicle numbers	Manufacturer	Build date
1	1501–1508	Niigata Transys	May 2006
2	1509–1515	Niigata Transys	April 2008
3	1551	Niigata Transys	January 2009
4	1552–1557	Niigata Transys	January 2010
5	1558–1563	Niigata Transys	January 2011
6	1564–1565	Niigata Transys	January 2012
7	1566–1567	Kinki Sharyo	January 2013
8	1568–1569	Niigata Transys	January 2014

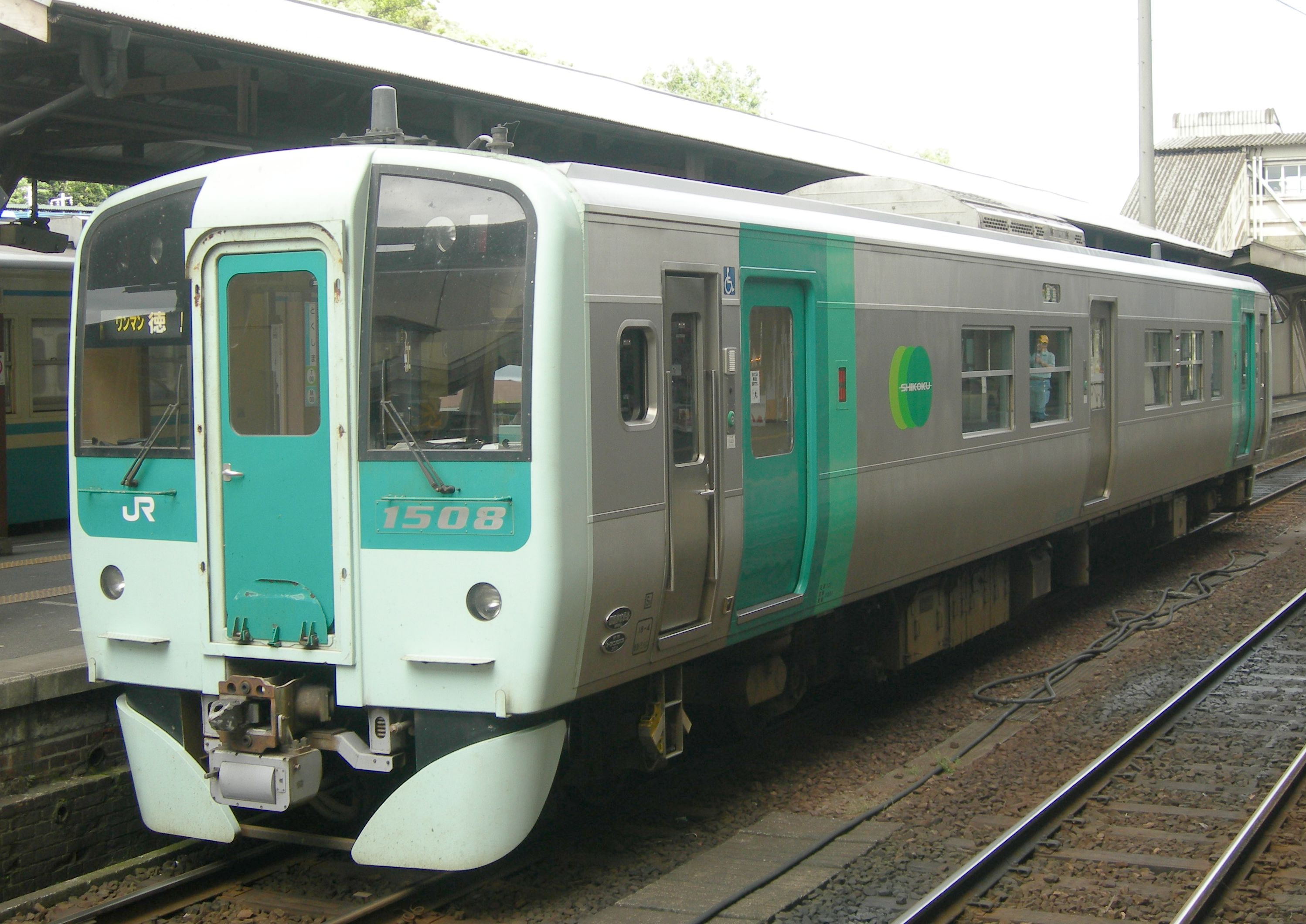
1st-batch car 1508

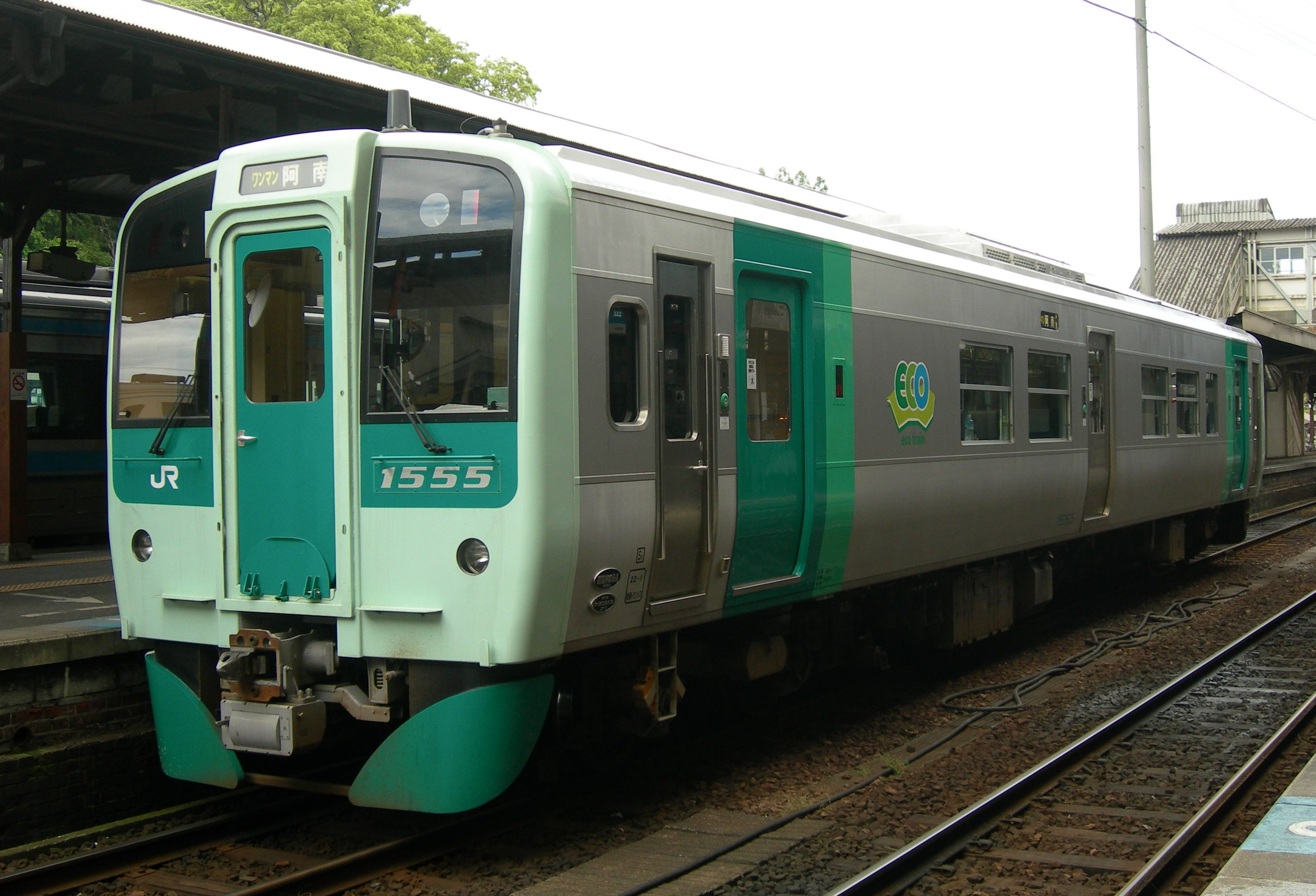
4th-batch car 1555

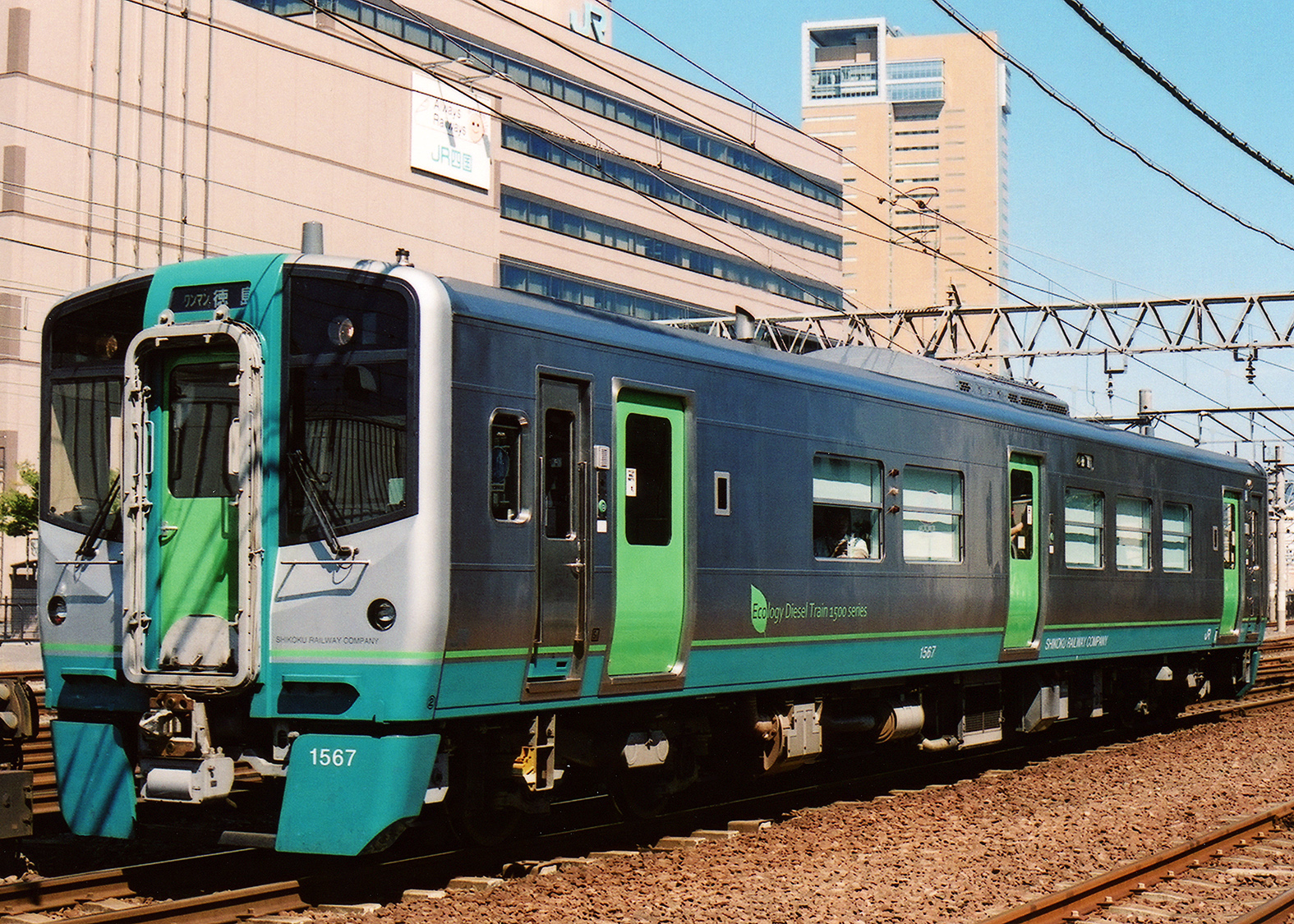
7th-batch car 1567

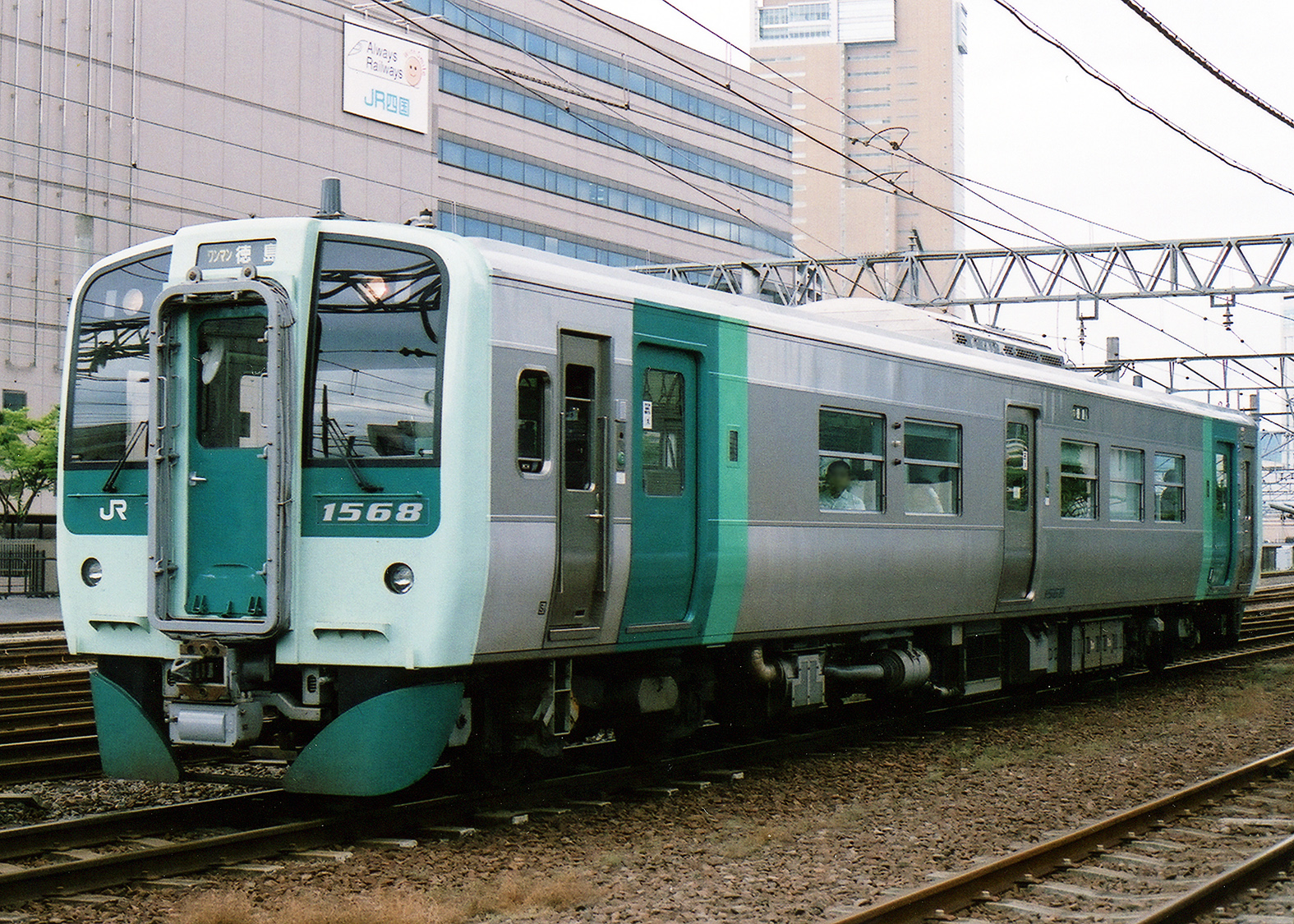
8th-batch car 1568

== Interior ==
Passenger accommodation in the sets built up to January 2012 consists of transverse flip-over seating arranged 2+2 abreast. Sets built from 2013 onward have a mixture of transverse and longitudinal seating.

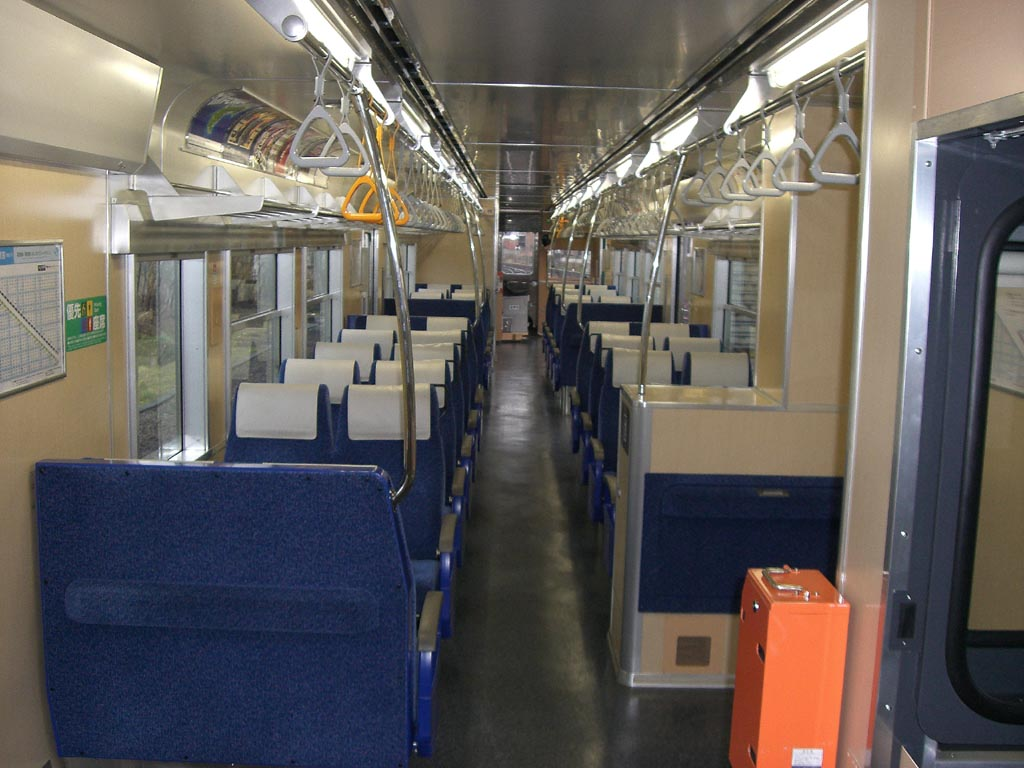
Interior view of car 1504

== History ==
The first trains entered service on 25 May 2006.

The two 7th-batch cars, 1566 and 1567, entered service from the start of the revised timetable on 16 March 2013.
