= Niigata Transys =

Japanese rolling stock manufacturer

Niigata Transys Co., Ltd

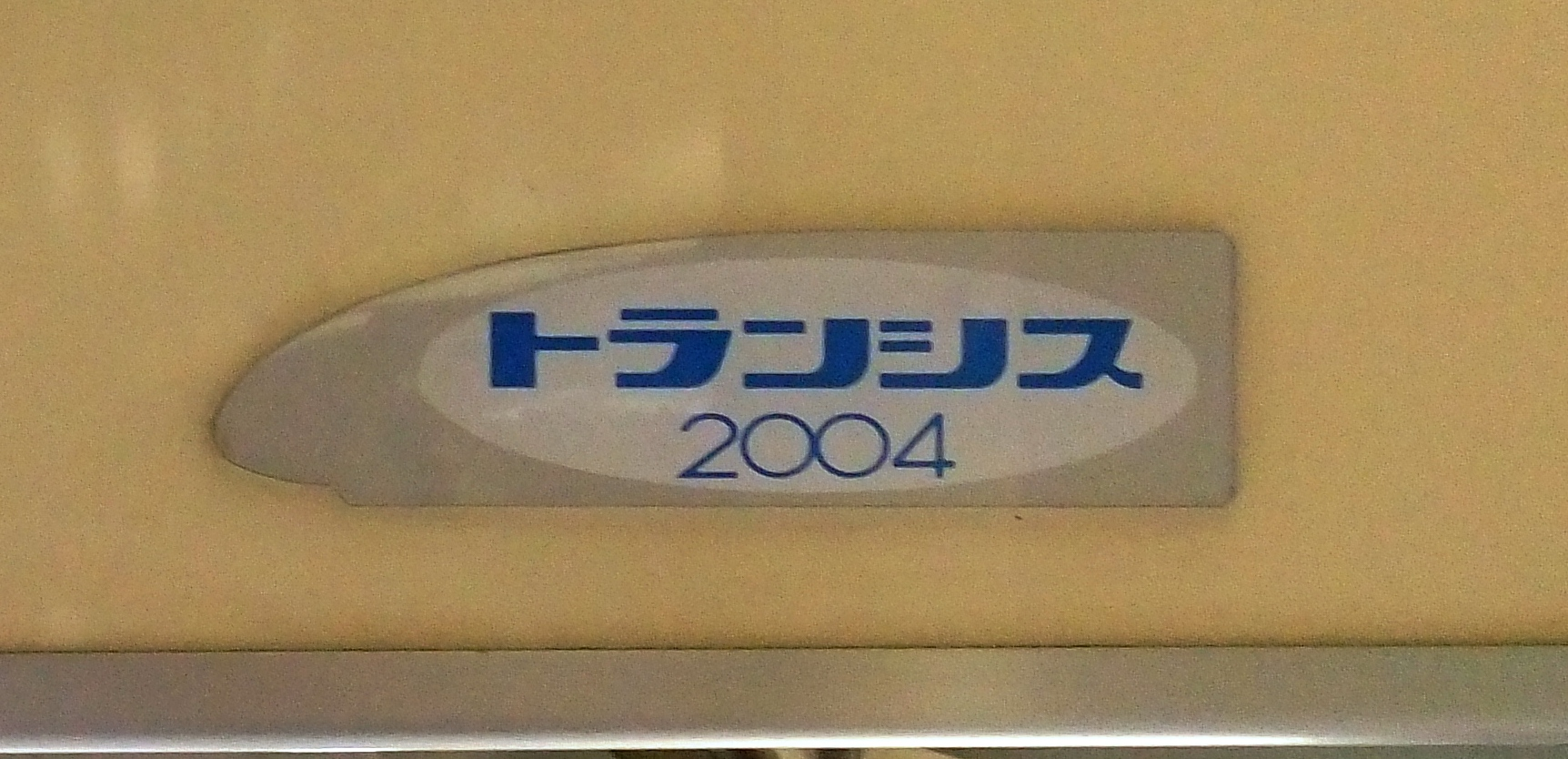
- Niigata Transys manufacturer's plate on a Hisatsu Orange Railway 150 series train
- Native name: 新潟トランシス株式会社
- Company type: Subsidiary
- Industry: Transport equipment
- Founded: February 3, 2003; 23 years ago
- Headquarters: Seirō, Niigata, Japan
- Key people: Chiaki Bito (President)
- Products: Rolling stock; Snowplows
- Number of employees: 341
- Parent: IHI Corporation
- Website: www.niigata-transys.com

Niigata Transys Co., Ltd. (新潟トランシス株式会社) is a Japanese railway vehicle and equipment manufacturer based in Seirō, Niigata. The company is a subsidiary of IHI Corporation and has a factory in Niigata, and representative offices in Osaka, Sapporo, Sendai, and Niigata.

== Products ==
=== Low-floor LRV ===
- Kumamoto KCT Kumamoto City Transportation Bureau 0800 series tramcar
- Okayama Electric Railway 9200 "Momo" tramcar
- Takaoka Manyosen MLRV1000 tramcar
- Toyama Portram TLR0600 tramcar
- Toyama Centram 9000 series tramcar
- Fukui Echizen L-shaped tramcar
- Fukui F1000 series "Fukuram" tramcar
- Utsunomiya Light Rail HU300 series "LIGHTLINE" tramcar

=== Diesel multiple units ===
- KiHa 32 series
- KiHa 48 series
- KiHa 85 series
- KiHa 100 series
- KiHa 121 series
- KiHa 122/127 series
- KiHa 126 series
- KiHa 187 series
- KiHa 189 series
- KiHa 200 series
- KiHa 2000 series
- TH2100
- TH9200
- AT500
- HSOR 100
- HSOR 150
- HB-E300 series
- ET122

=== Electric multiple units ===
- HK100 series

=== Other rolling stock ===
- JR East E26 series sleeping cars
- 12-1201 vintage steam passenger train
- NRNS snow blower
- NS35W airport maintenance vehicle
- Railcars

== Clients ==
- Toronto Transit Commission
  - RT20 flat car and crane (1980)
  - RT21 flat car
