= Kurobe Gorge =

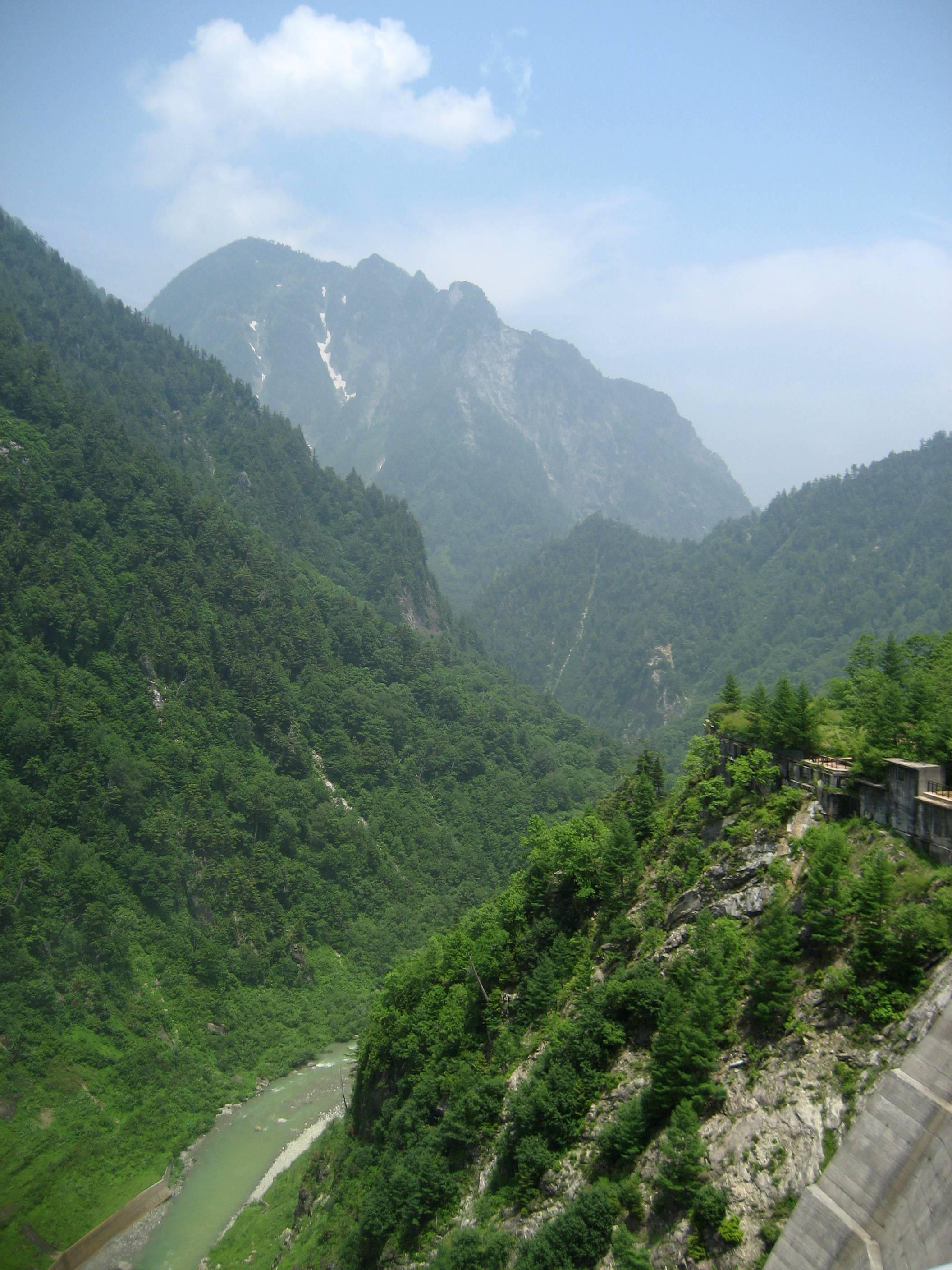
Kurobe Gorge view from Kurobe Dam

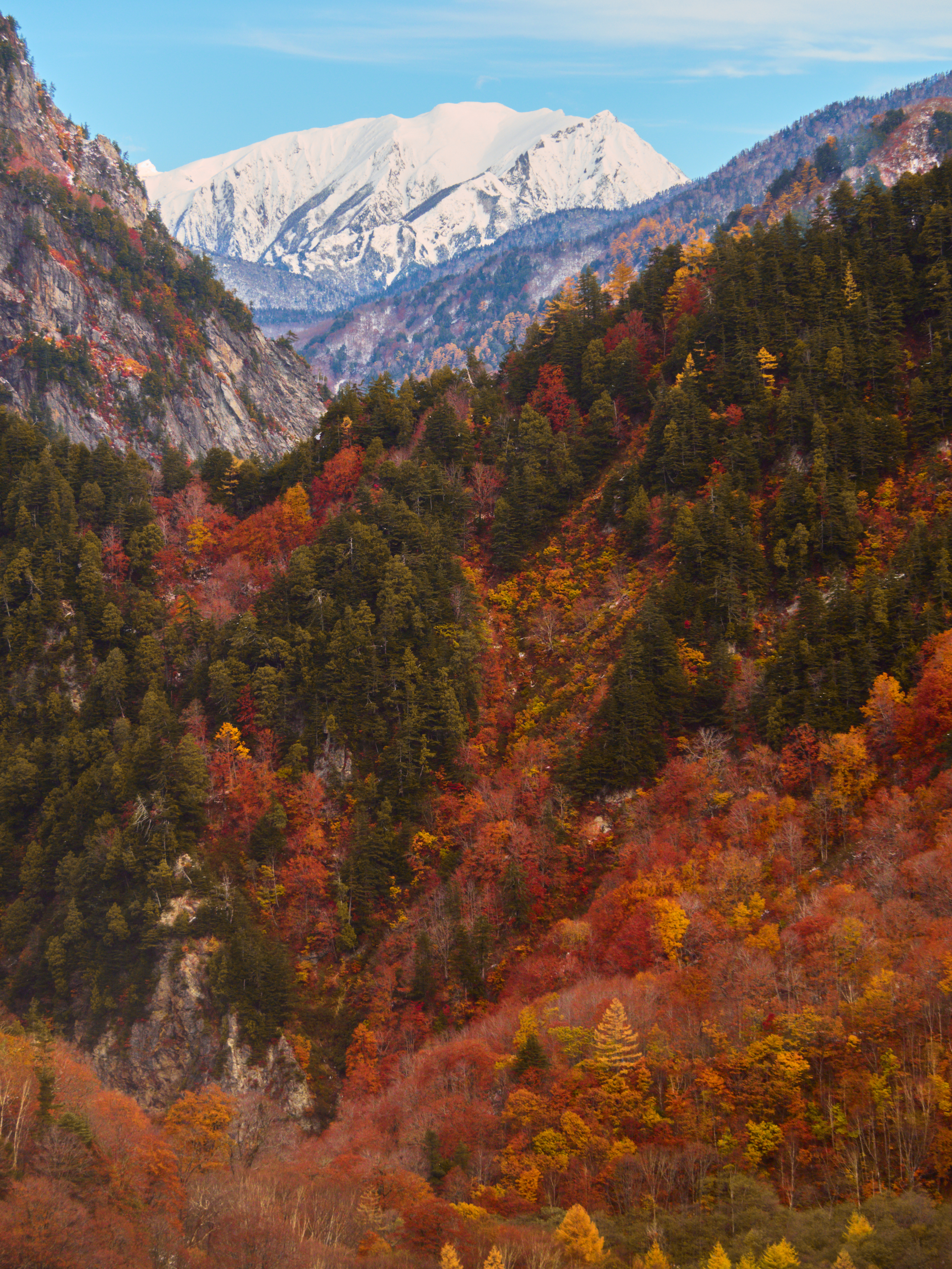
Kurobe Gorge from Kurobe Damn in autumn

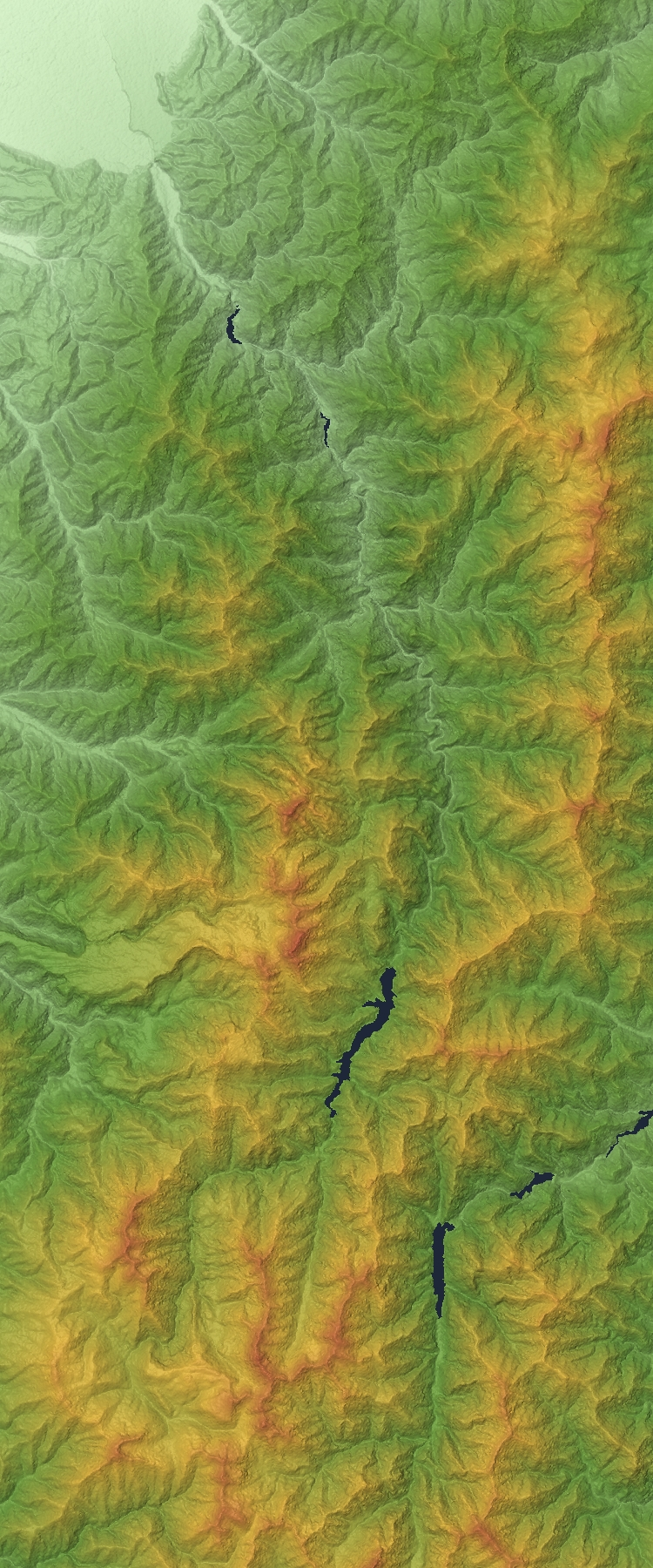
Kurobe Gorge relief map

Kurobe Gorge (黒部峡谷, Kurobe-kyokoku) is a V-shaped canyon located at Kurobe, Toyama Prefecture, Japan.

The Kurobe Dam in Kurobe Gorge is one of highlights of the Tateyama Kurobe Alpine Route. The area was designated the Chūbu-Sangaku National Park on December 4, 1934.

== Geology ==
Kurobe Gorge in a V-shaped gorge. The gorge is part of the Northern Japan Alps. It was formed by the Kurobe River flowing to the Ushiro-Tateyama Mountain Range carving granite stones.

== Geography ==
=== Shimonoroka ===
Shimonoroka, or lower corridor, is the central Kurobe Gorge.

Shimonoroka can be accessed by using the Nichiden hodo (Nichiden Trail) or Suihei hodo (Horizontal Trail). These trails are very dangerous; they can be only 20–50 cm wide and lie 500 m above the riverbed. In October 2019, five people died on the trails.

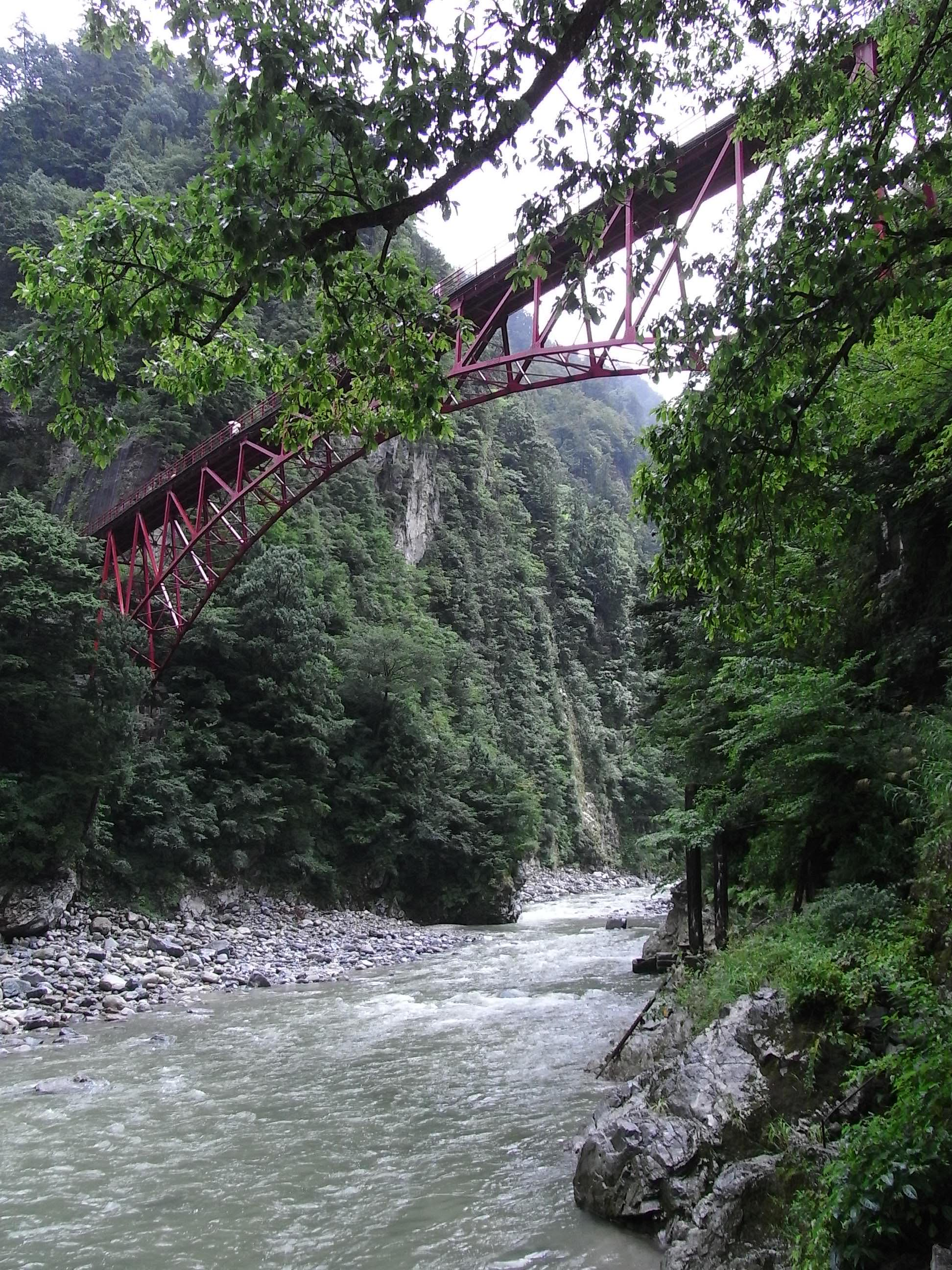
Okukane Bridge

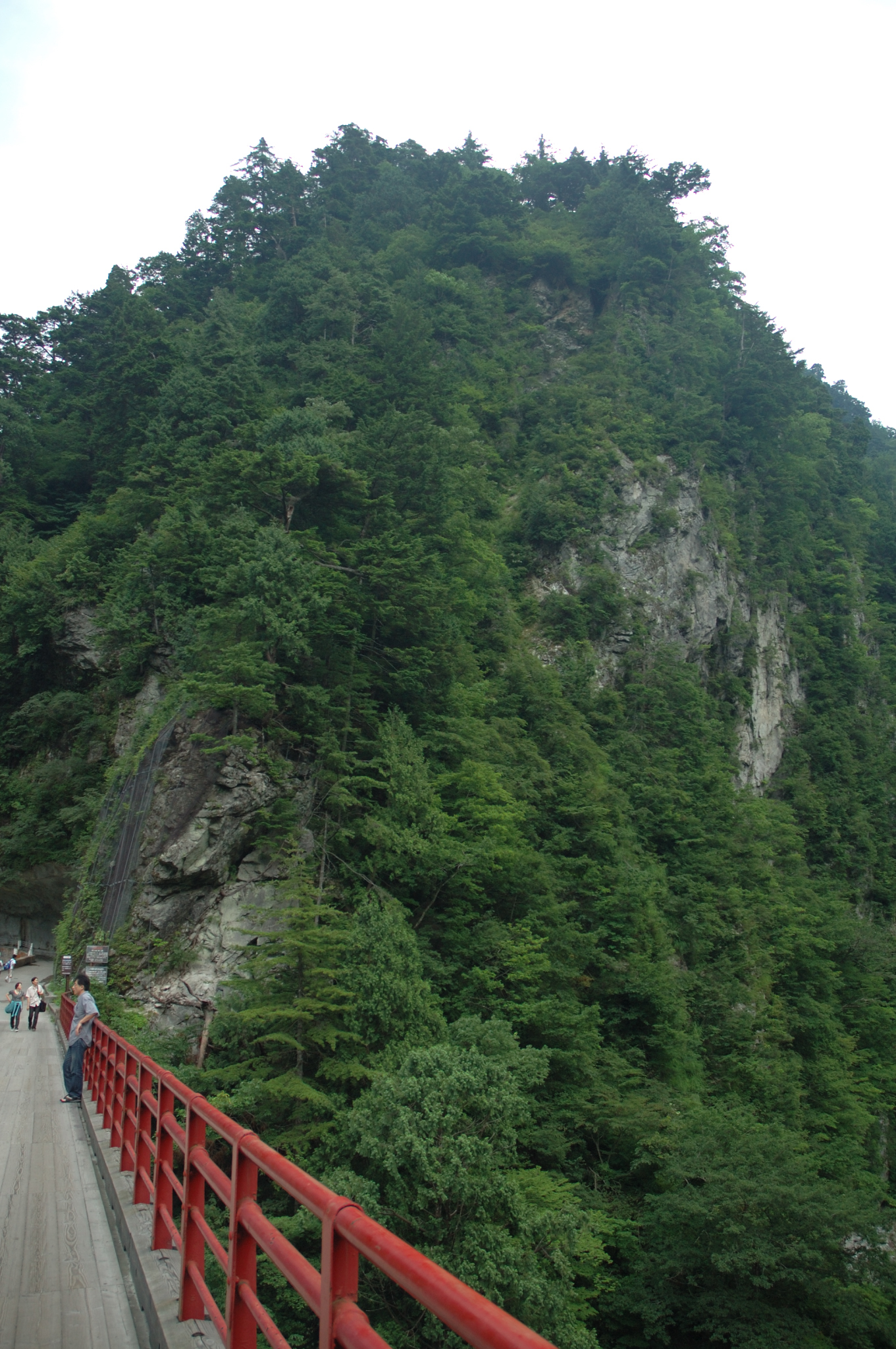
Okukane Mountain

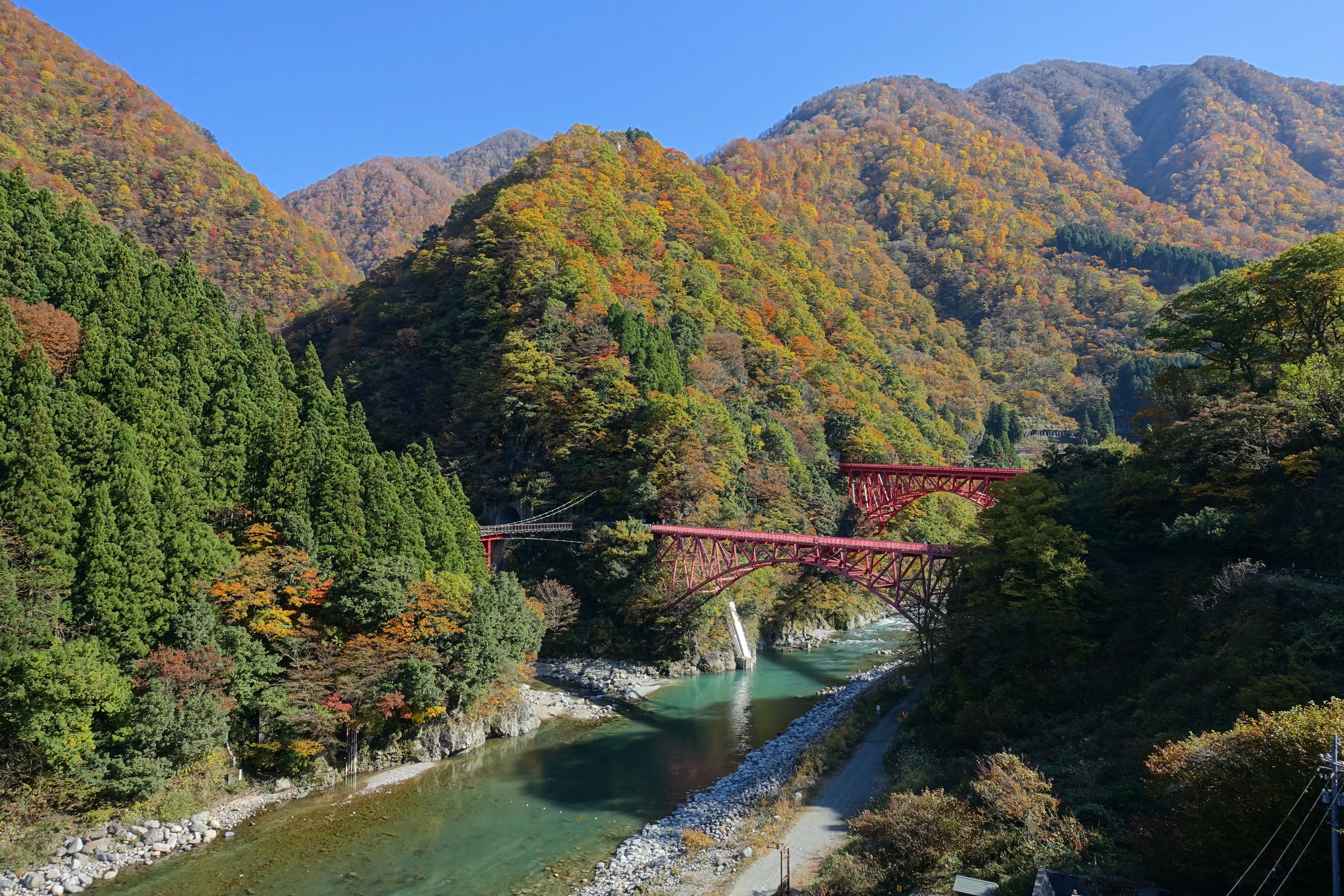
Kurobe Gorge in autumn

=== Kaminoroka ===
Kaminoroka means Higher corridor.

== Access ==
The gorge can be accessed by the Kurobe Gorge Railway operated by the Kurobe Gorge Railway Co. The train ride starts at Unazuki Station and ends at Keyakidaira Station. But during winter, the gorge can only be accessed by foot.

== Attractions ==
=== Kurobe Dam ===
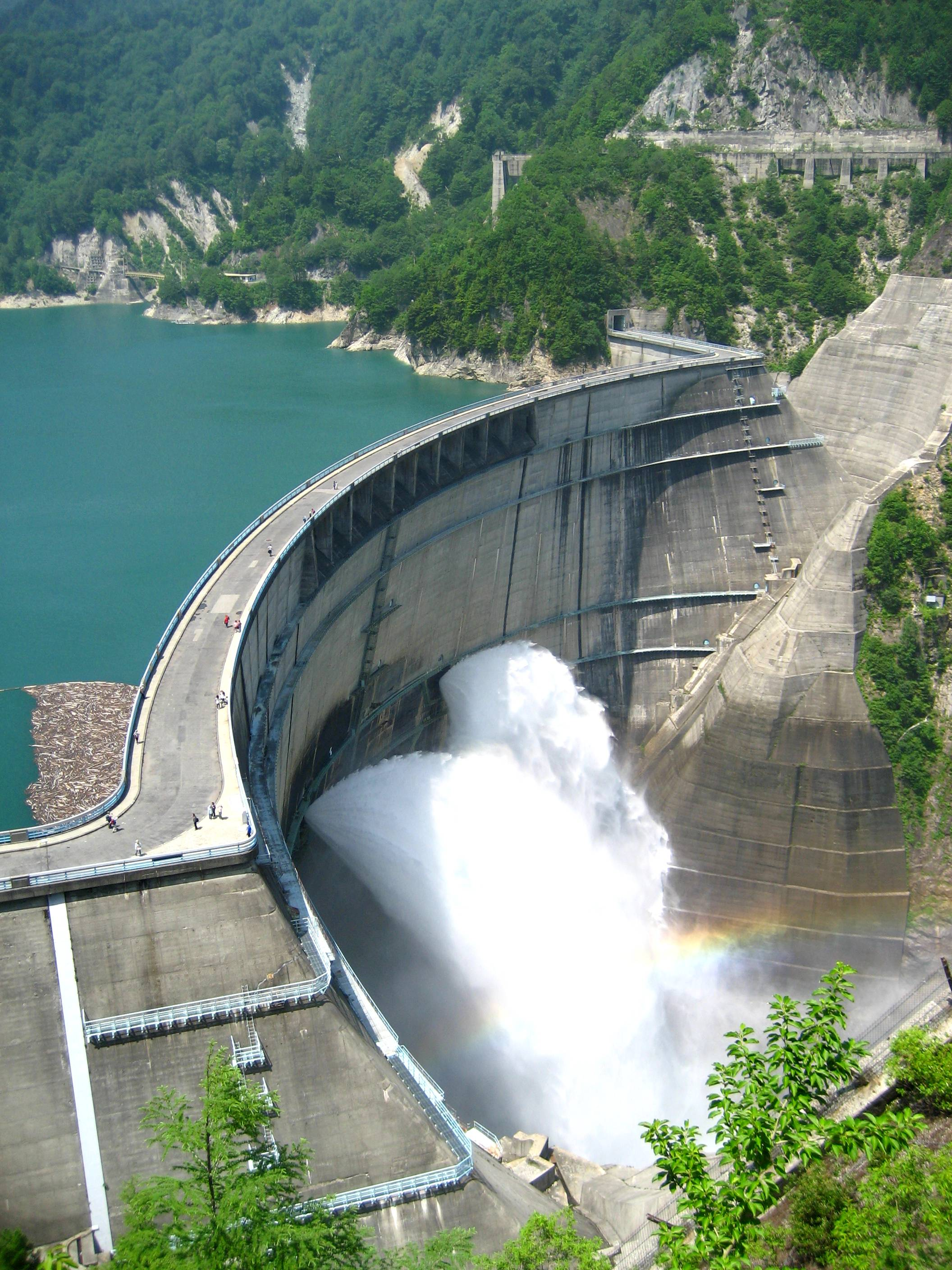

Kurobe Dam is a hydroelectric dam operated by Kansai Electric Power Company. It runs through the Kurobe River. It is the tallest dam in Japan which the height of 186 meters. It began operation in 1961.

=== Kurobe Gorge Railway ===
Kurobe Gorge Railway is 20 km rail road operating from Unazuki Station to Keyakidaira Station. Parts of the railroad is under maintenance as of February 2025 due to the earthquake that hit Ishikawa in January 2024. The railroad operates between mid-April to the end of November and runs along the Kurobe River.

=== Unazuki Onsen ===
Unazuki Onsen is an onsen located at the entrance of the gorge. It started operation in 1923.

=== Tateyama Kurobe Alpine Route ===
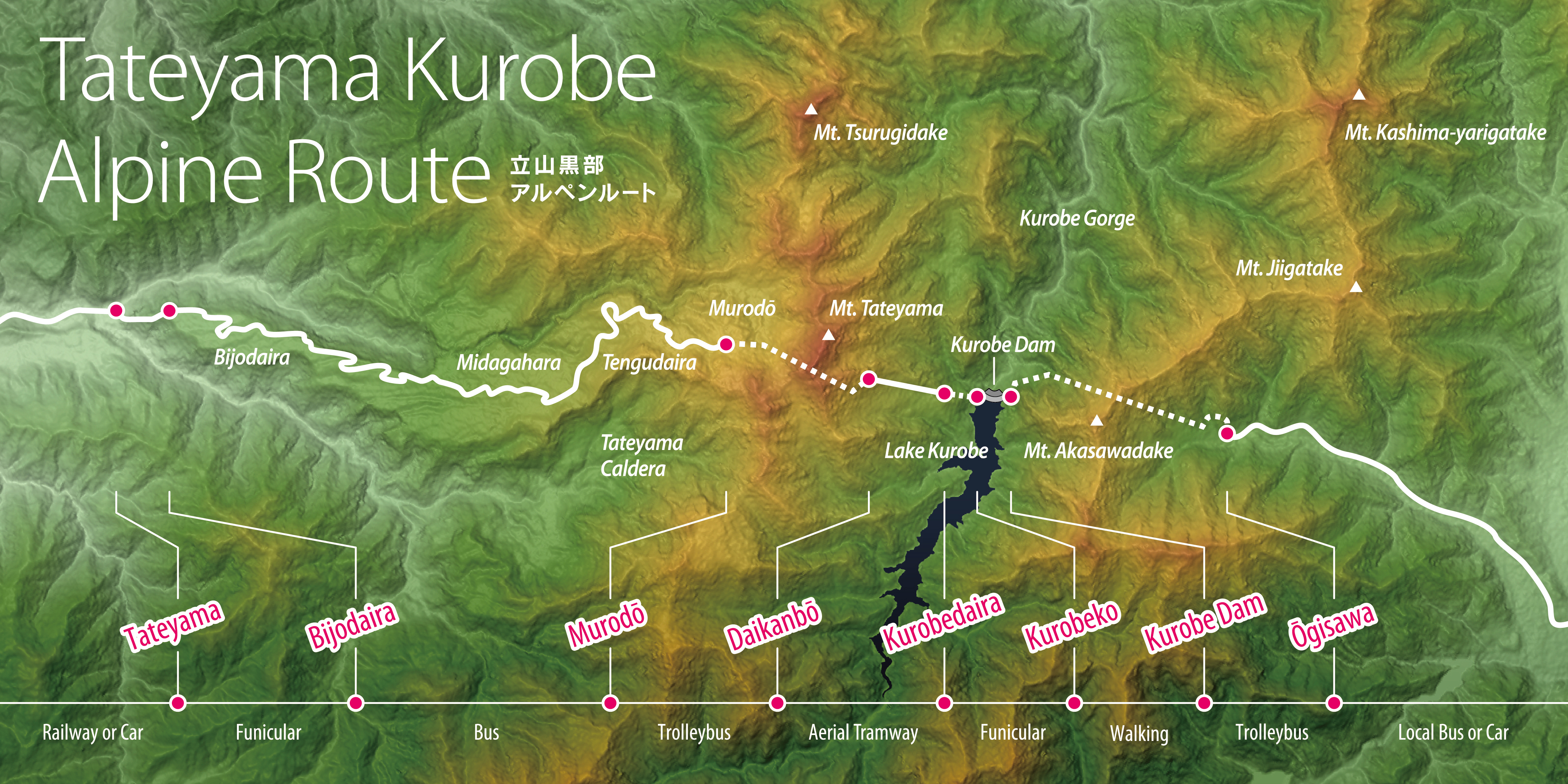

Tateyama Kurobe Alpine Route is a 37.2 kilometers route that connects Toyama Prefecture and Nagano Prefecture. It run along the Kurobe Dam.

=== Nekomata Station ===
Nekomata Station is a train station of the Kurobe Gorge Railway. It is the only train station in Japan that includes the word "Neko" (猫; lit. 'Cat'). It was originally a station for construction workers, it was open to the public on October 4, 2024.

== See also ==
- Mount Tate
