= Sasadaira Station =

Railway station in Kurobe, Toyama Prefecture, Japan

Coordinates: 36.7829°N 137.6241°E

Sasadaira Station 笹平駅
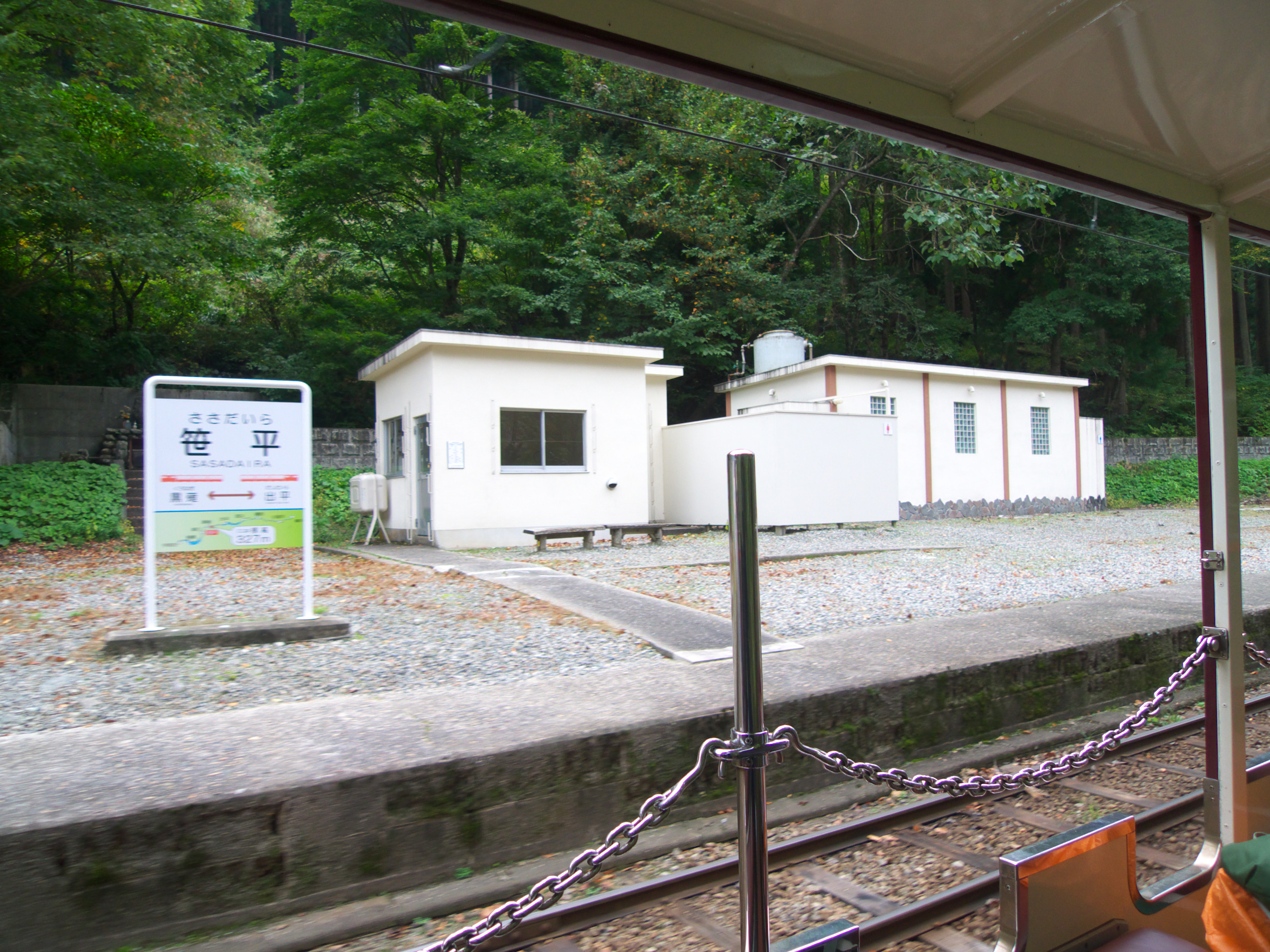
- Station platform

General information
- Location: Kurobe, Toyama; Japan
- Operator: Kurobe Gorge Railway
- Distance: 7.0 km from Unazuki
- Platforms: 1 side platform

Construction
- Structure type: At-grade

Other information
- Status: Unstaffed

History
- Opened: 16 November 1953
Location

Sasadaira Station (笹平駅, Sasadaira Eki) is a railway station operated by Kurobe Gorge Railway in Kurobe, Toyama Prefecture, Japan.

== Station overview ==
Sasadaira is a seasonal station. For most of the year, Sasadaira Station is closed to passenger traffic and is only served by trains for Kansai Electric Power Company employees. However, the station is sometimes served by trains between the end of April and the beginning of May, when snowfall prevents trains from heading any further towards Keyakidaira Station. The station is equipped with a toilet.

== Adjacent stations ==
«	Service	»
Kurobe Gorge Railway
Kuronagi	Kanden employees only	Dashidaira
