= Kanetsuri Station =

Railway station in Kurobe, Toyama Prefecture, Japan

Coordinates: 36.7341°N 137.6515°E

Kanetsuri Station 鐘釣駅
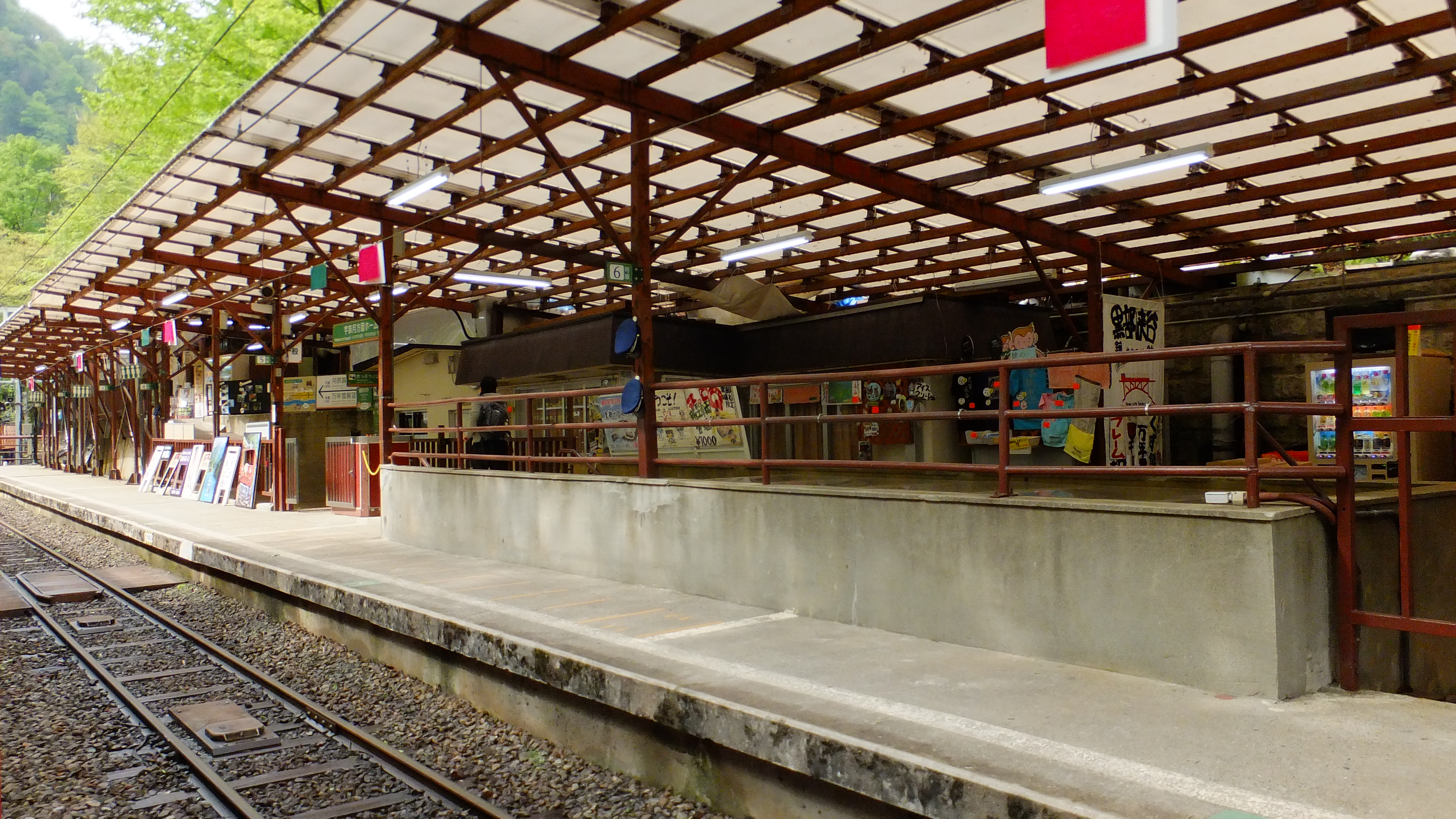
- Station platform

General information
- Location: Kurobe, Toyama; Japan
- Operator: Kurobe Gorge Railway
- Distance: 14.3 km from Unazuki
- Platforms: 2 side platforms

Construction
- Structure type: At-grade

History
- Opened: 16 November 1953
Location

Kanetsuri Station (鐘釣駅, Kanetsuri Eki) is a railway station operated by Kurobe Gorge Railway in Kurobe, Toyama Prefecture, Japan.

== Station overview ==
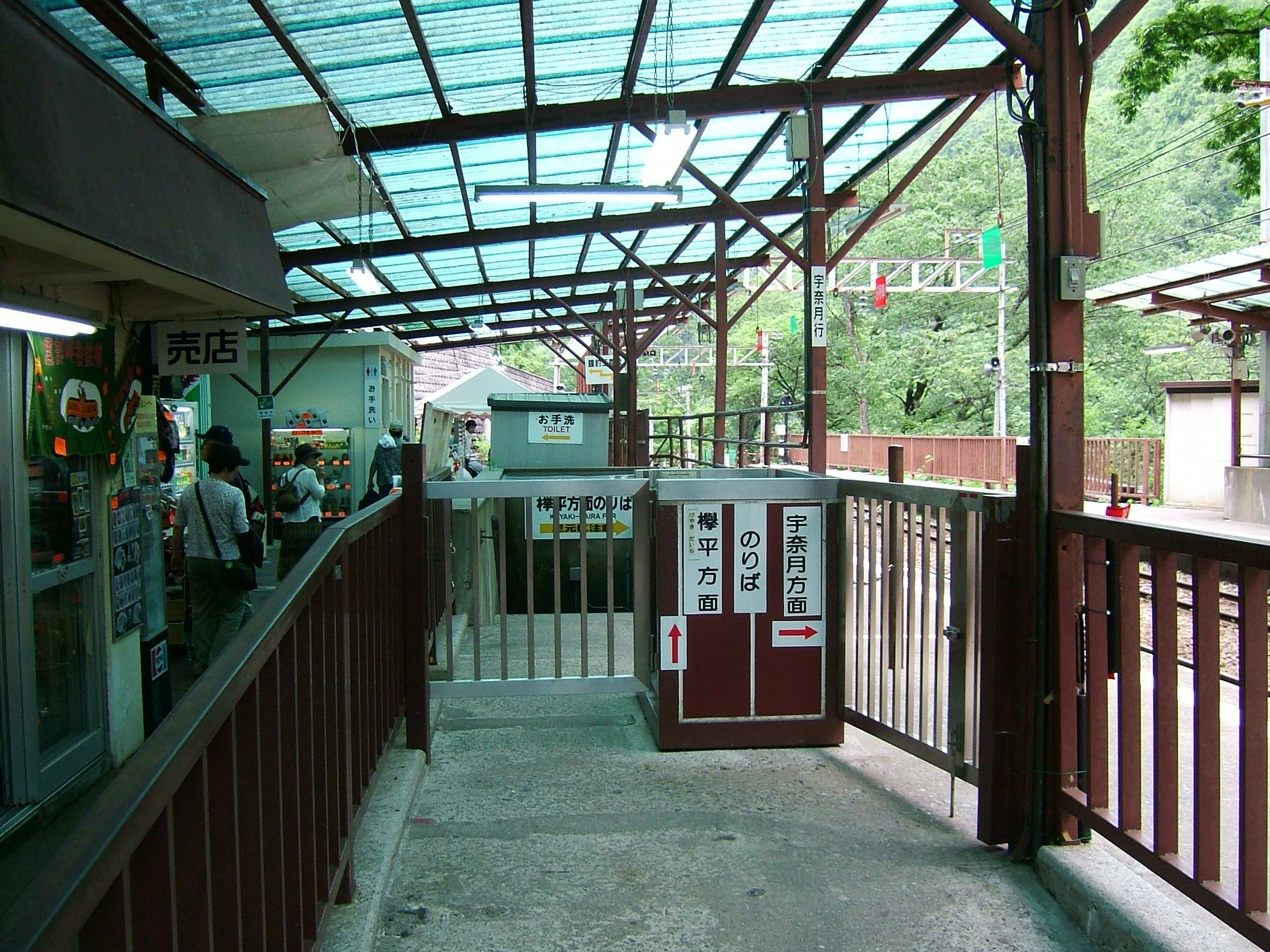
Entrance to platforms

Kanetsuri Station is a staffed station and has two side platforms. The station serves Kanetsuri Onsen, which features a public outdoor onsen and a ryokan.

== Adjacent stations ==
«	Service	»
Kurobe Gorge Railway
Kuronagi	Regular passenger service	Keyakidaira
Nekomata	Kanden employees only	Koyadaira
