= Kuronagi Station =

Railway station in Kurobe, Toyama Prefecture, Japan

Coordinates: 36.7863°N 137.6250°E

Kuronagi Station 黒薙駅
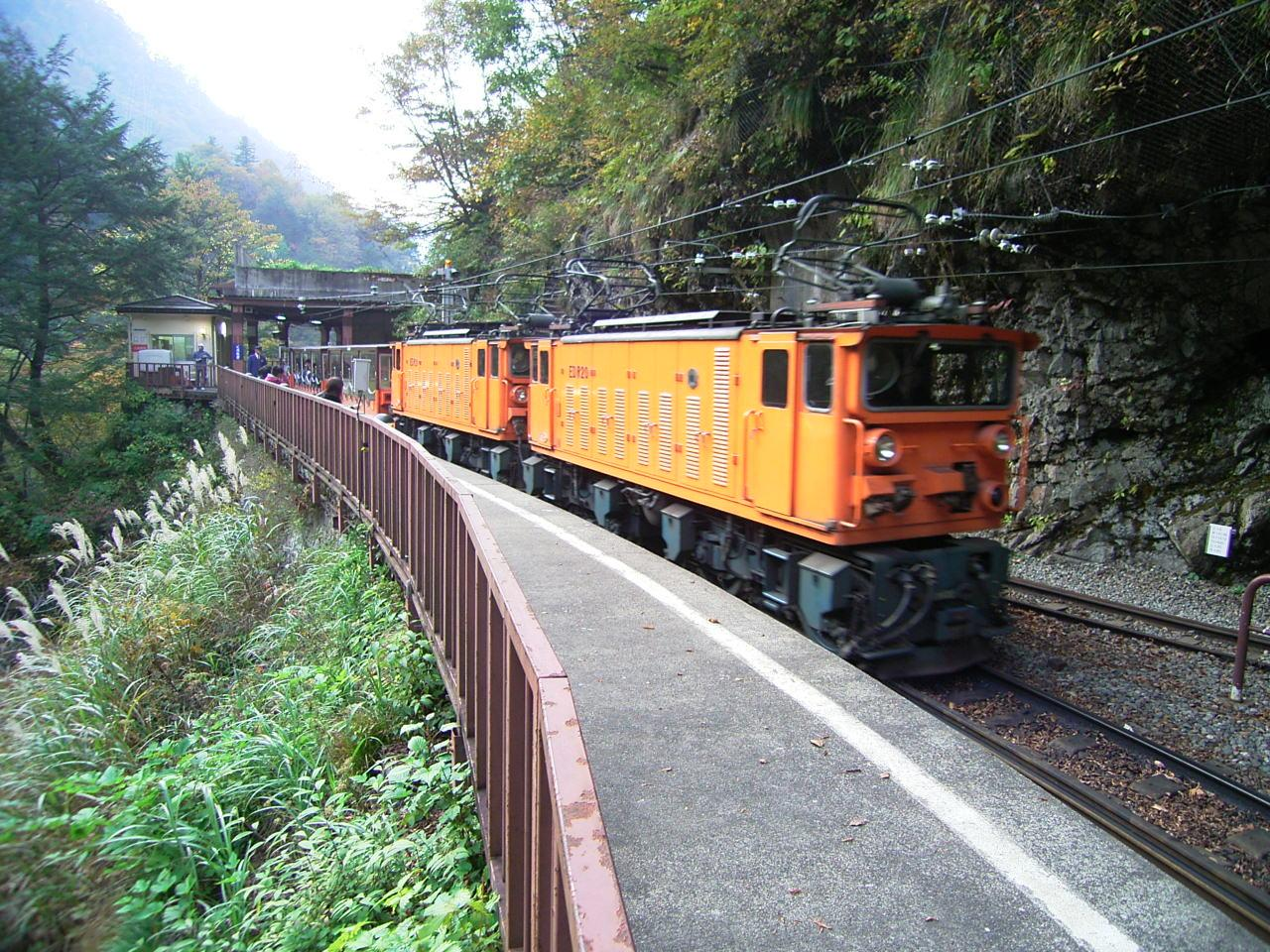
- A ED type train at Kuronagi

General information
- Location: Kurobe, Toyama; Japan
- Operator: Kurobe Gorge Railway
- Distance: 6.5 km from Unazuki
- Platforms: 1 side platform

Construction
- Structure type: At-grade

History
- Opened: 16 November 1953
Location

Kuronagi Station (黒薙駅, Kuronagi Eki) is a railway station operated by Kurobe Gorge Railway in Kurobe, Toyama Prefecture, Japan.

== Station overview ==
Station platform

Kuronagi Station is a staffed station and has a single side platform. The station is located above a steep gorge above the Kuronagi River, a tributary of the Kurobe River. Directly adjacent to the station, the tracks cross the Kuronagi River via the Atobiki Bridge (後曳橋), which sits 60 m above the river.

Kuronagi Station is a short hike away from Kuronagi Onsen.

== Adjacent stations ==
«	Service	»
Kurobe Gorge Railway
Unazuki	Regular passenger service	Kanetsuri
Moriishi	Kanden employees only	Sasadaira
