= Keyakidaira Station =

Railway station in Kurobe, Toyama Prefecture, Japan

Coordinates: 36.6969°N 137.6580°E

Keyakidaira Station 欅平駅
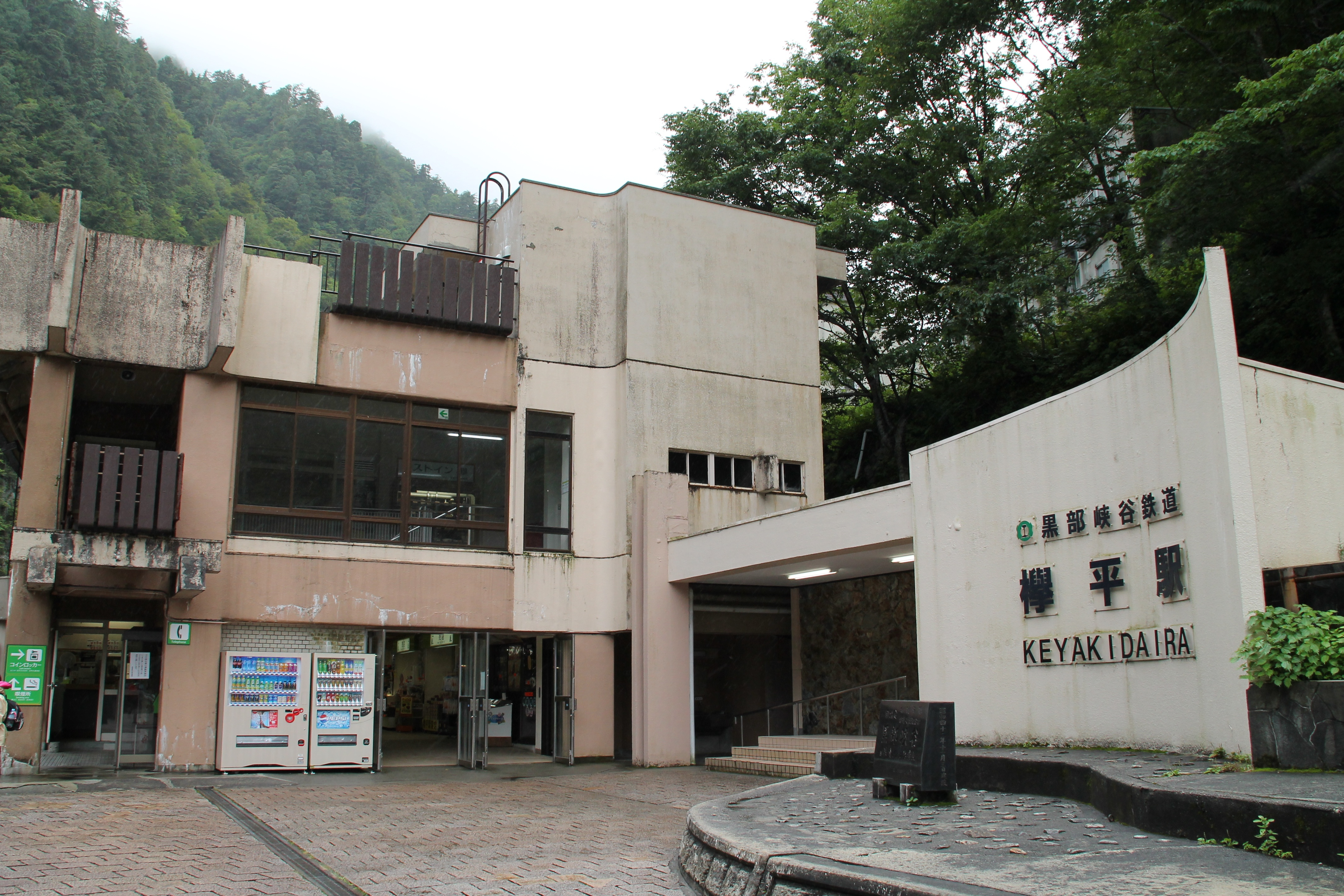
- Station entrance

General information
- Location: Kurobe, Toyama; Japan
- Operator: Kurobe Gorge Railway
- Distance: 20.1 km from Unazuki
- Platforms: 1 side platform at Keyakidaira Kabu Station

Construction
- Structure type: At-grade

History
- Opened: 16 November 1953
Location

Keyakidaira Station (欅平駅, Keyakidaira Eki) is a railway station operated by Kurobe Gorge Railway in Kurobe, Toyama Prefecture, Japan. Though the tracks continue southward to Kurobe Dam, access past Keyakidaira Station is limited to employees of the Kansai Electric Power Company (Kanden) and guided tours.

== Station overview ==
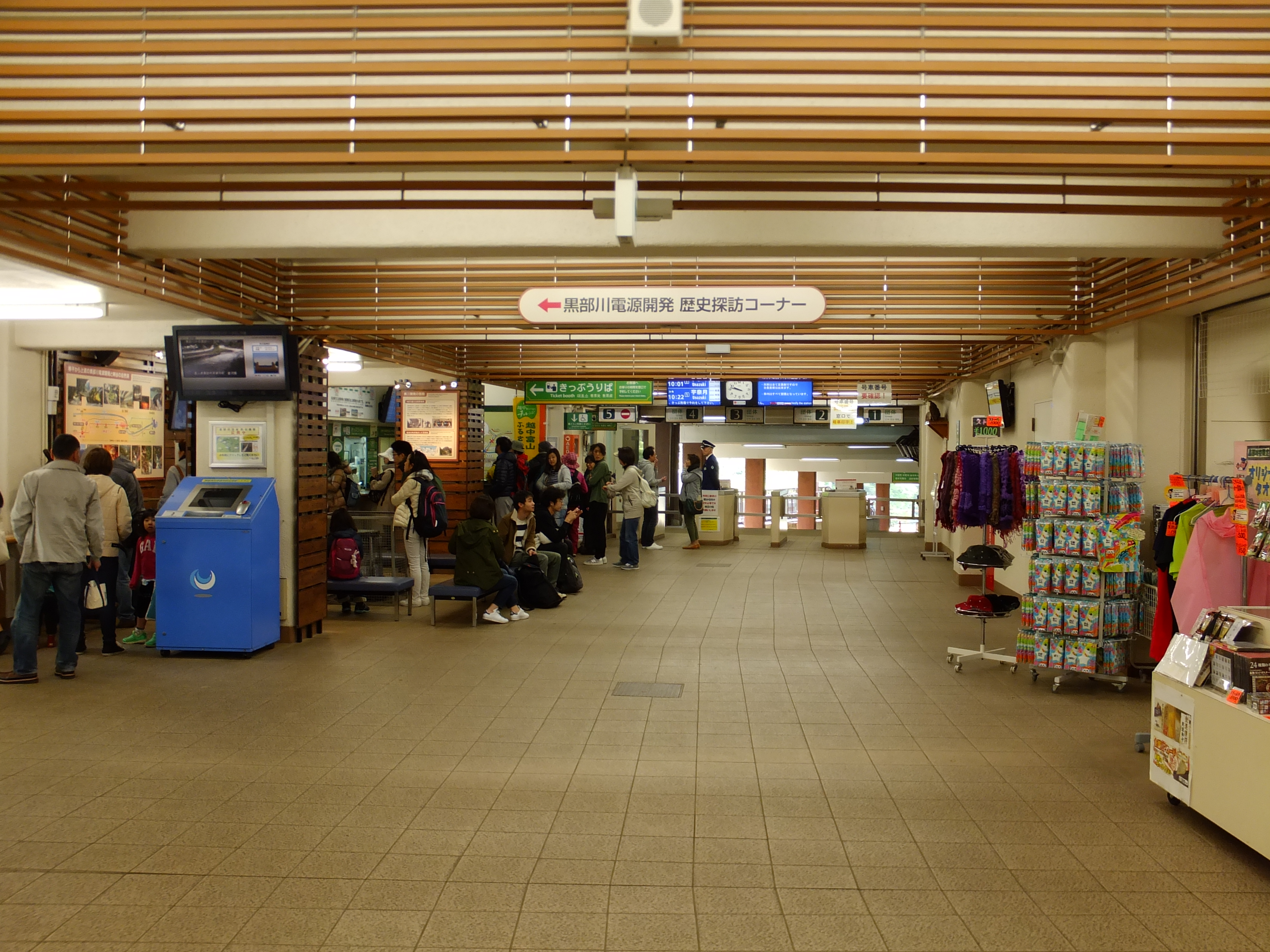
Station interior

Keyakidaira Station is composed of two separate platforms that are separated by 200 m of elevation. The lower platform, known as Keyakidaira Kabu Station (欅平下部駅; lit. "Lower Keyakidaira"), is open to the general public, and is the terminus of regular passenger service. The upper platform, known as Keyakidaira Jobu Station (欅平上部駅; lit. "Upper Keyakidaira"), is limited to Kanden employees only. The two platforms are connected by an elevator that is capable of carrying one train car at a time.

There are several onsens near Keyakidaira Station, some of which have ryokans operating at the springs.

== Adjacent stations ==
«	Service	»
Kurobe Gorge Railway
Kanetsuri	Regular passenger service	Terminus
Koyadaira	Kanden employees only	Terminus
