= Kurobe Gorge Railway =

Railway company in Toyama Prefecture, Japan

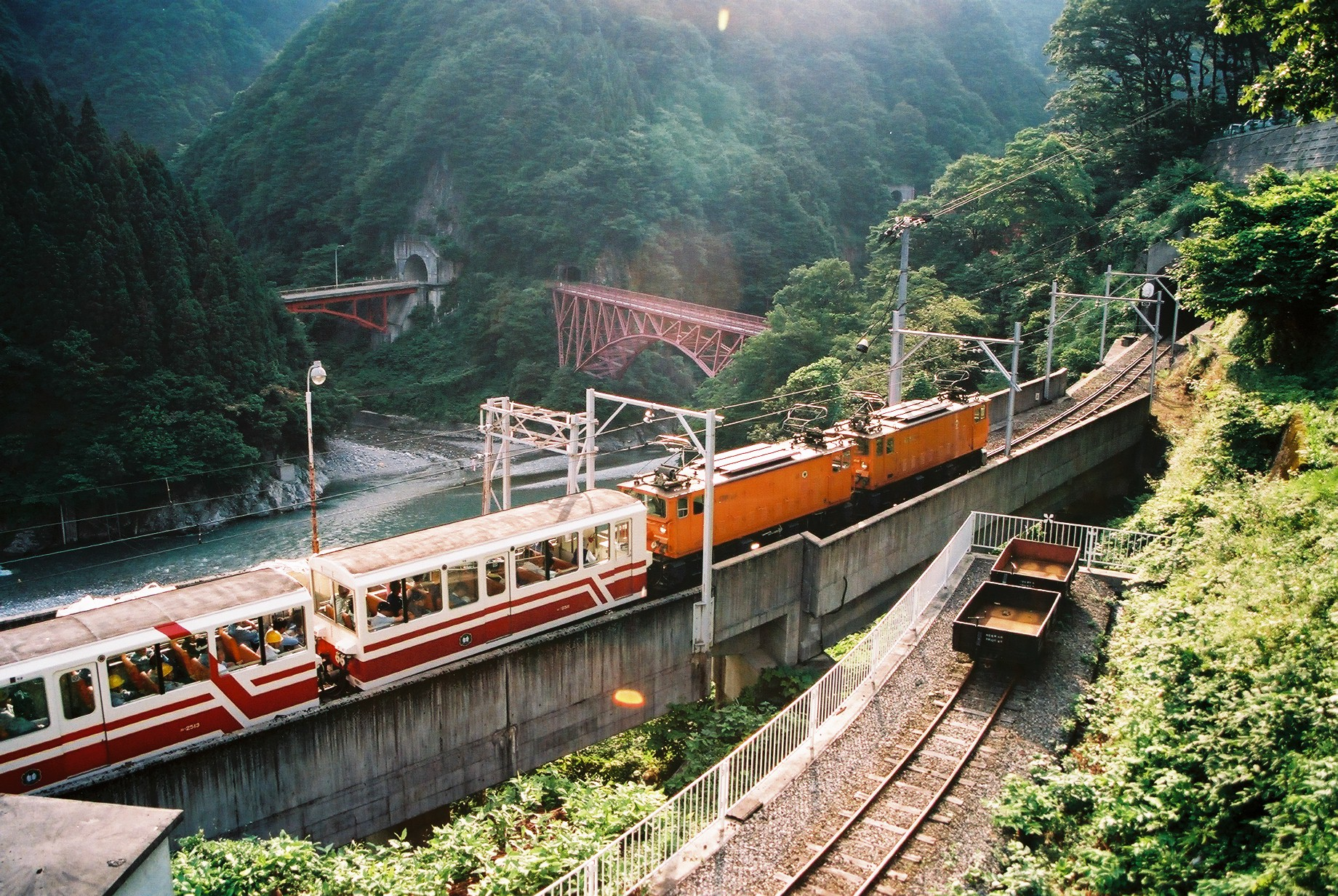
- Kurobe Gorge Railway
- Native name: 黒部峡谷鉄道株式会社
- Romanized name: Kurobe Kyōkoku Tetsudō Kabushiki gaisha
- Type: Public-private KK
- Industry: Transportation
- Founded: 4 May 1971
- Website: Official website

The Kurobe Gorge Railway (黒部峡谷鉄道株式会社, Kurobe Kyōkoku Tetsudō Kabushiki gaisha), or Kurotetsu (黒鉄) for short, is a private, 762 mm (2 ft 6 in) narrow gauge railway company operating the Kurobe Gorge Main Line along the Kurobe River in the Kurobe gorge area of Toyama Prefecture, Japan. The railway was built to serve the construction of the Kurobe dam for the Kansai Electric Power Company, which was completed in 1963; Kurotetsu was spun off from the power company in June 1971, but remains a wholly owned subsidiary. At its terminus, the Main Line links to Kurobe Senyō Railway, which is not open to the general public.

As of 2006, the company operated 25 locomotives, 139 passenger carriages and 204 freight wagons.

== History ==
The Unazuki - Nekomata section opened in 1926, electrified at 600 VDC and was extended to Keyakidaira in 1937.

The passenger service started in 1953.

== Maintenance and technical details ==
As of 2023, there are three employees qualified to do track inspections. These inspections are done monthly, workers walking on foot for 7 km (4.3 mi) stretches to visually inspect that segment of the track, taking around 3 hours. Any variance between the rails of over 6 mm (0.24 in) requires repair. Due to the large number of curves (well over 200) along the 20 km (12 mi) route, sections of 10 m (33 ft) rails are used instead of longer ones as would be used on a typical railroad. The shorter sections of track therefore have more joints (and more locations for issues to occur), requiring detailed inspections, with a particular attention paid to these joints. At peak times there are 5 trains an hour running on the line; inspections are done when the trains are running, increasing the safety risks for these inspections.

== Stations ==
All stations are in Kurobe, Toyama.

Due to a bridge collapse during the 2024 Noto earthquake, all stations past Nekomata are closed as of September 2025. Trains operate as a round-trip between Unazuki and Nekomata, with passengers being able to temporarily alight at the Nekomata terminus. Full-line operations between Unazuki Station and Keyakidaira Station will resume from 1 October 2026 and passengers will no longer be able to board or alight at Nekomata Station.

Key

●: Served by passenger trains
▲: Served by passenger trains only during April–May
★: Temporarily served by passenger trains (typically closed to passengers)
｜: Closed to passengers

Name	Japanese	Distance (km)	Train stop
Unazuki	宇奈月	0.0	●
Yanagibashi	柳橋	2.1	｜
Moriishi	森石	5.1	｜
Kuronagi	黒薙	6.5	●
Sasadaira	笹平	7.0	▲
Dashidaira	出平	9.1	｜
Nekomata	猫又	11.8	★
Kanetsuri	鐘釣	14.3	●
Koyadaira	小屋平	17.5	｜
Keyakidaira	欅平	20.1	●

== Equipment ==
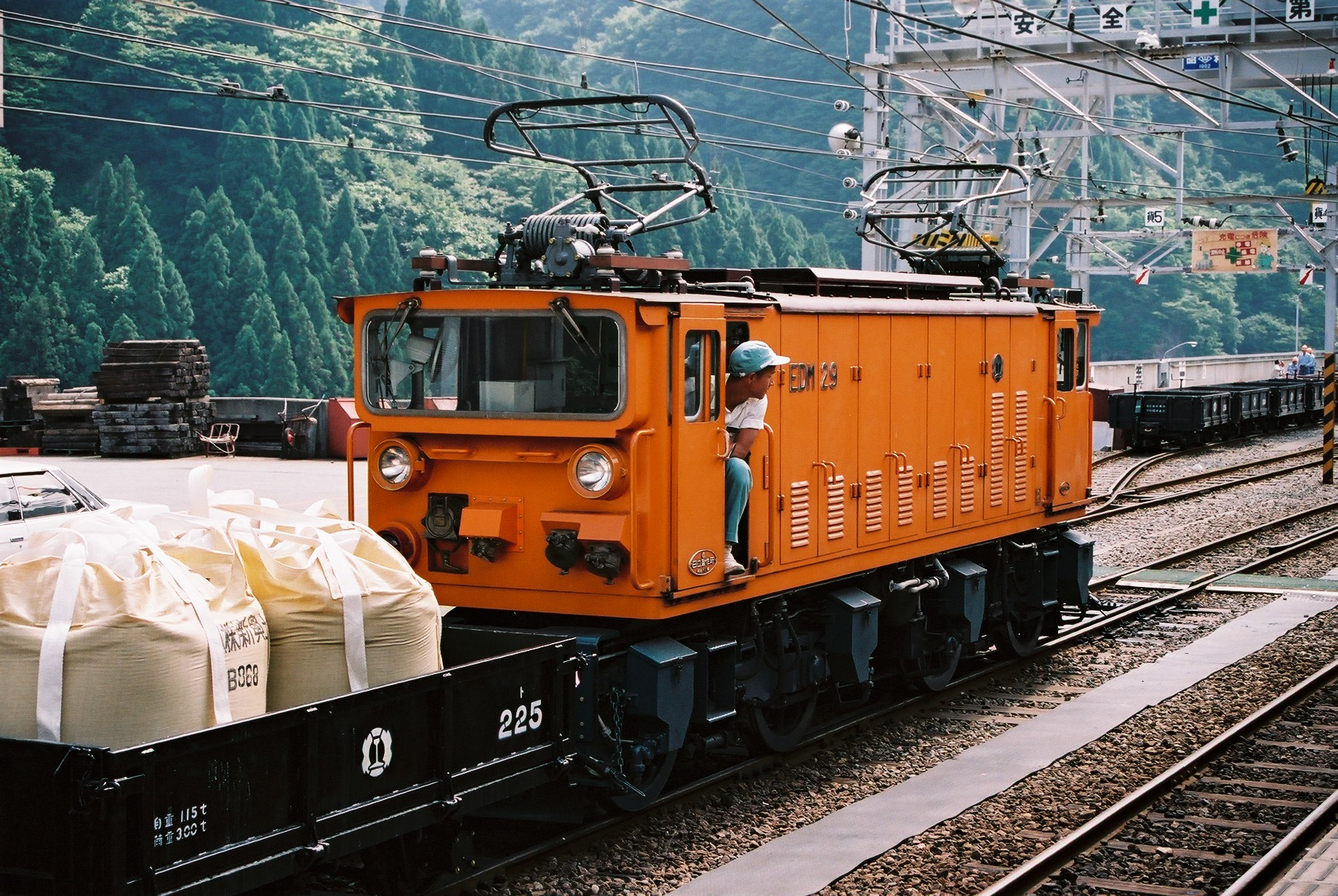
No. 29

=== Electric locomotives ===
- EB class (Nos. 1–3, 5–7): withdrawn from service in 1984.
- ED class (Nos. 8–11): 9–11 survive.
- EDS class (Nos. 13, 15–17): No. 13 survives.
- EDM class (Nos. 22, 23, 30–32)
- EDR class (Nos. 17–21, 24–29, 33)
- EHR class (Nos. 101, 102)

=== Battery electric locomotives ===
- BB class (Nos. 1, 2)

=== Diesel locomotives ===
- DB class (No. 11): withdrawn 1985
- DD21: withdrawn 1979
- DD22, DD23: DD23 withdrawn 2000
- DD24
- DD25

=== Passenger cars ===
- Ha (ハ) class: 2-axle open car.
- 1000 class: open car
- 2000 class: heated car with fixed, widthwise seats, extra charge to ride
- 2500 class: heated car with reversible seats so that passengers can always ride facing forward, extra charge to ride
- 2800 class: lounge car, heated, reversible seats, extra charge to ride
- 3000 class: panoramic observation car, extra charge to ride

The cars are manufactured by Alna Koki. The 2000 class cars have drivers cabs at their front end.

=== Freight cars ===
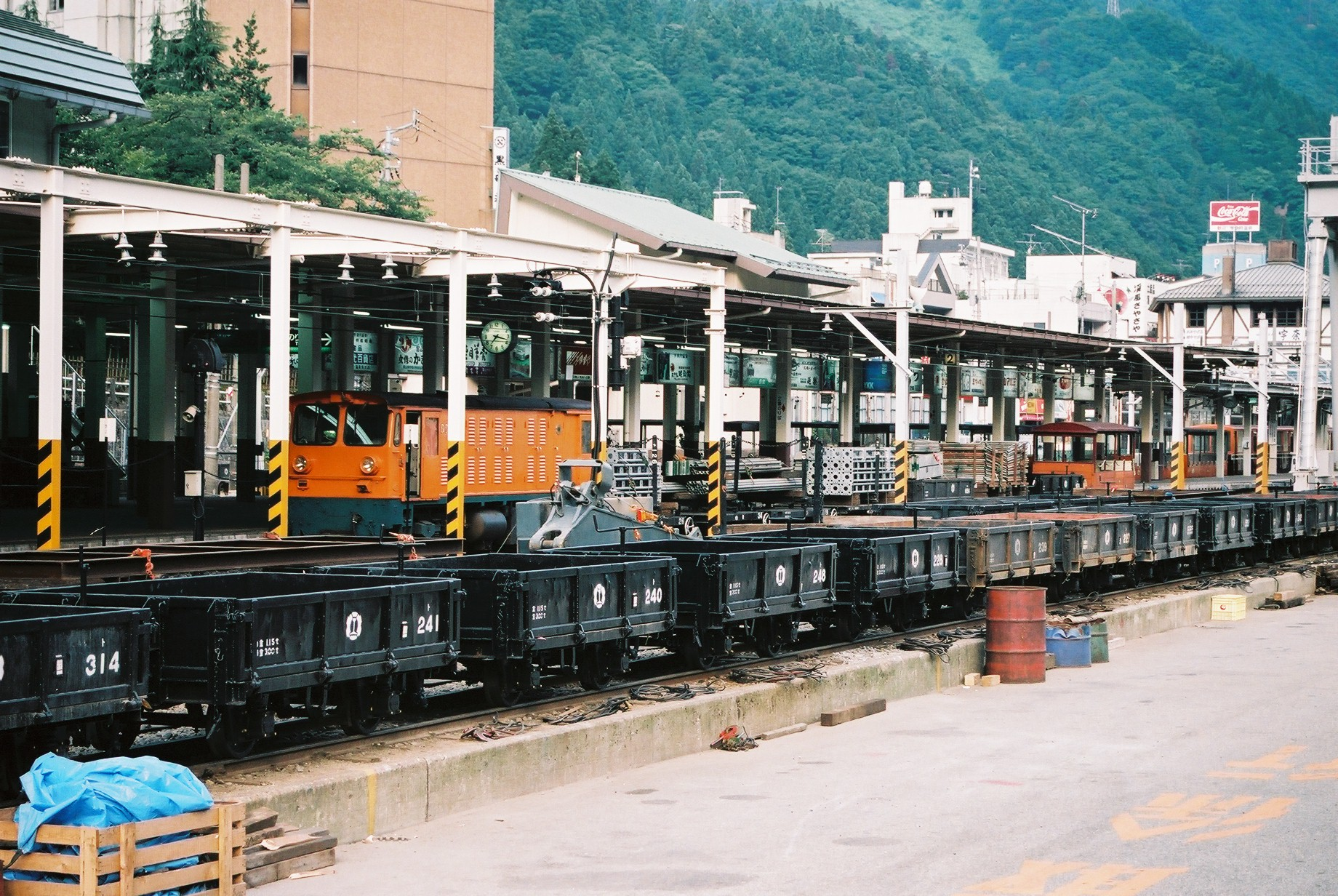
Freight cars of the Kurobe Gorge Railway

- wa (ワ) class (boxcar)
- oshi (オシ) class depressed center flatcar
- muchi (ムチ) class flatcar
- nachi (ナチ) class flatcar
- ochi (オチ) class flatcar
- oto (オト) class gondola
- to (ト) class gondola
- chi (チ) class flatcar
- shi (シ) class depressed center flatcar

== See also ==
- List of railway lines in Japan
