= Gobō Thermal Power Plant =

Gobō Thermal Power Station
- Gobō Thermal Power Station
- Official name: 御坊発電所
- Country: Japan
- Location: 1-3 Aza Tomishima, Minami Shioya, Shioya-cho, Gobō, Wakayama 644-0024
- Coordinates: 33°51′36.1″N 135°09′11″E
- Status: Operational
- Commission date: April 1984
- Owner: Kansai Electric
- Operator: Kansai Electric

Thermal power station
- Primary fuel: Fuel oil, Crude oil
- Site area: 330,000 sq.m.

Power generation
- Units operational: 2 (+1 long-term offline)
- Nameplate capacity: 1800 MW

External links
- Website: Official website

Gobō Thermal Power Station (御坊発電所, Gobō karyoku hatsudensho) is a fossil-fuel power station operated by Kansai Electric in the city of Gobō, Wakayama, Japan. It located on the Pacific coast.

== History ==
The Gobō Thermal Power Station was the first to be built in Japan on an artificial island in the Pacific Ocean. It came on line in September 1984 with Unit 1, followed by Unit 2 in November 1984, and Unit 3 in March 1985. The initial installed capacity was 1800 MW; however, since its fuel sources are heavy oil or crude oil, operations were severely impacted by rising crude oil prices and its operational rate has been low. Operations on Unit 2 were suspended in April 2019 due to low demand and high costs.

== Plant details ==
Unit	Fuel	Type	Capacity	On line	Status
1	Heavy Oil/Crude Oil	Steam Turbine	600 MW	September 1984	operational
2	Heavy Oil/Crude Oil	Steam turbine	600 MW	November 1984	Long-term off-line April 2019
3	Heavy Oil/Crude Oil	Steam Turbine	600 MW	March 1985	operational

== See also ==
- List of fuel oil power stations
- List of power stations in Japan
