= Abutment =

Construction substructure

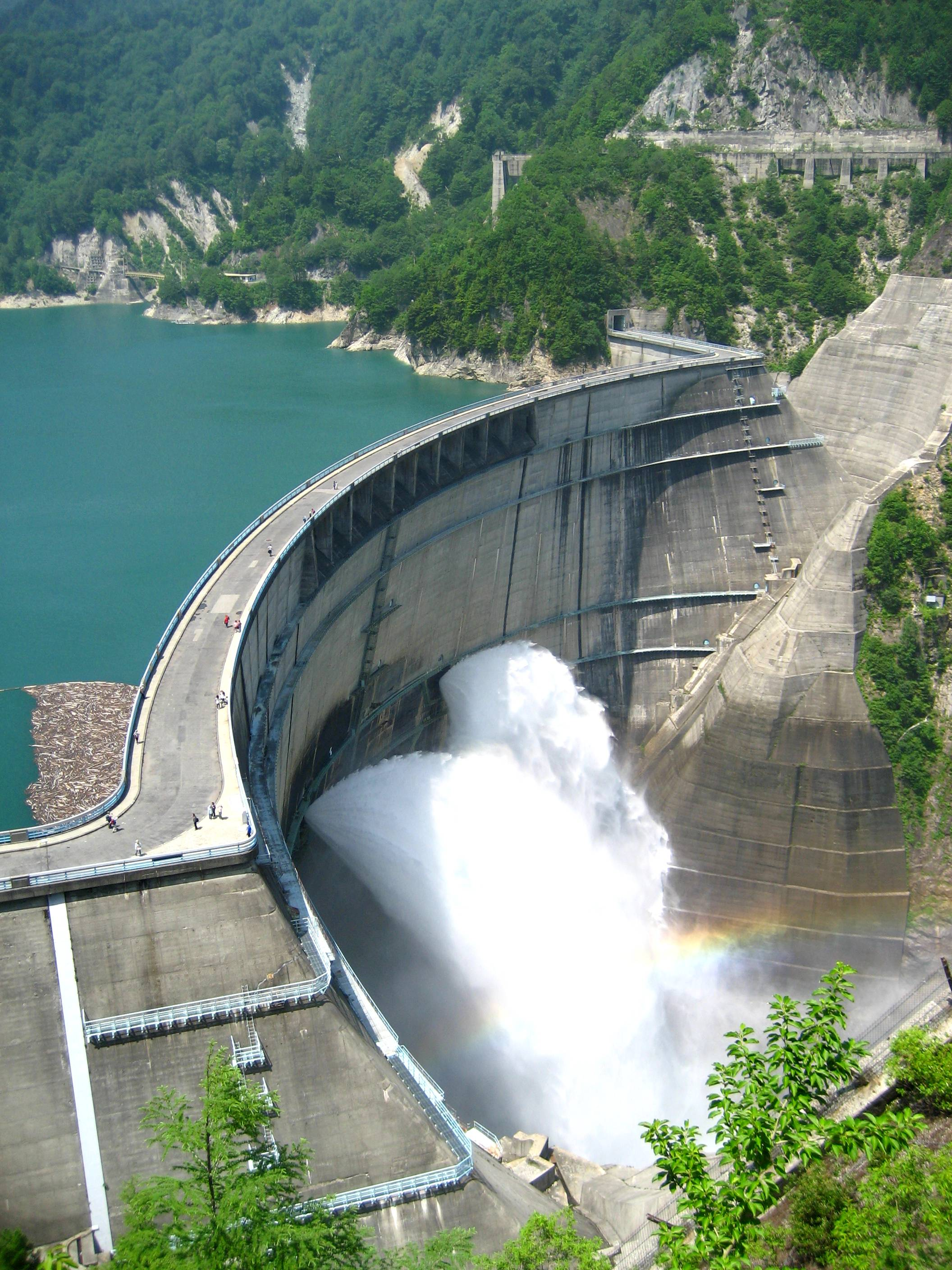
The superstructure of Kurobe Dam in Japan rests on opposing concrete abutments

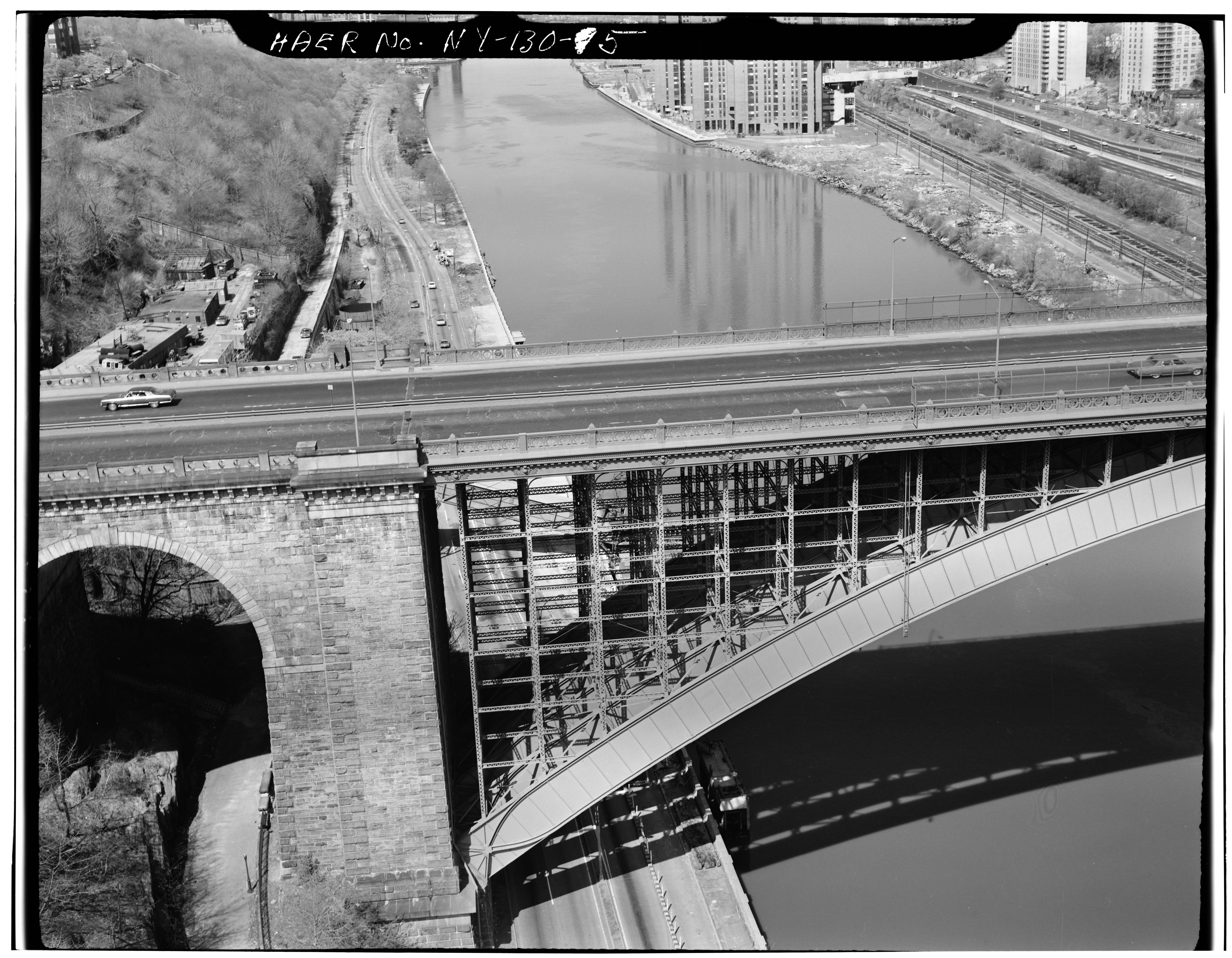
Abutment for a large steel arch bridge

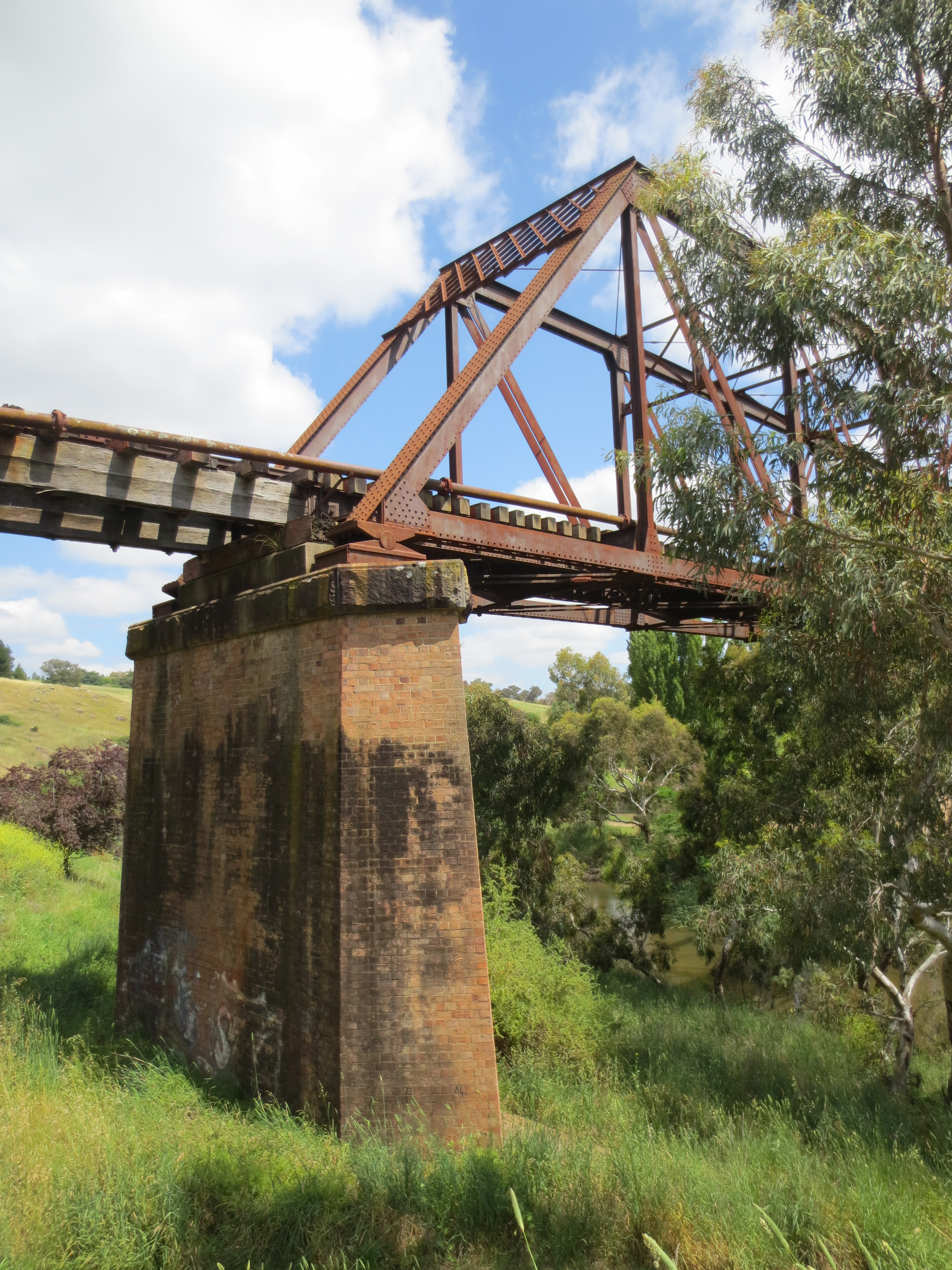
Brick abutment supporting disused tramway over the Yass River in Yass, New South Wales

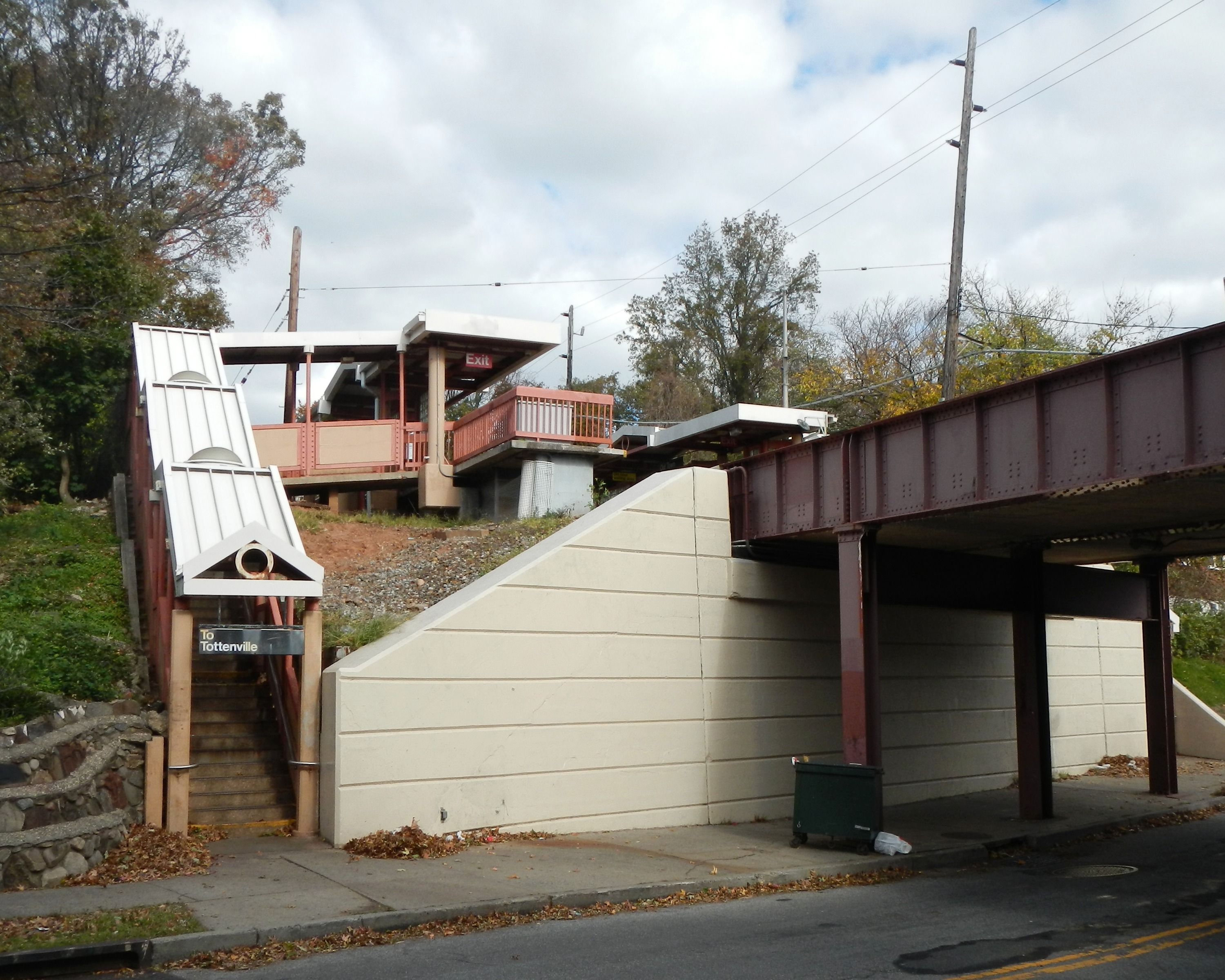
Cream-colored concrete abutment gives vertical support to both the small iron rail bridge and earthen fill of the bridge approach embankment at Old Town Station Staten Island Railway - Staten Island, New York

An abutment is the substructure at the ends of a bridge span or dam supporting its superstructure. Single-span bridges have abutments at each end that provide vertical and lateral support for the span, as well as acting as retaining walls to resist lateral movement of the earthen fill of the bridge approach. Multi-span bridges require piers to support ends of spans unsupported by abutments. Dam abutments are generally the sides of a valley or gorge, but may be artificial in order to support arch dams such as Kurobe Dam in Japan.

The civil engineering term may also refer to the structure supporting one side of an arch, or masonry used to resist the lateral forces of a vault. The impost or abacus of a column in classical architecture may also serve as an abutment to an arch.

The word derives from the verb "abut", meaning to "touch by means of a mutual border".

== Use ==
An abutment may be used to transfer loads from a superstructure to its foundation, to resist or transfer self weight, lateral loads (such as the earth pressure) and wind loads, to support one end of an approach slab, or to balance vertical and horizontal forces in an arch bridge.

== Types ==
Types of abutments include:

- Gravity abutment, resists horizontal earth pressure with its own dead weight
- U abutment, U-shaped gravity abutment
- Cantilever abutment, cantilever retaining wall designed for large vertical loads
- Full height abutment, cantilever abutment that extends from the underpass grade line to the grade line of the overpass roadway
- Stub abutment, short abutments at the top of an embankment or slope, usually supported on piles
- Semi-stub abutment, size between full height and stub abutment
- Counterfort abutment, similar to counterfort retaining walls
- Spill-through abutment, vertical buttresses with open spaces between them
- MSE systems, "Reinforced Earth" system: modular units with metallic reinforcement
- Pile bent abutment, similar to spill-through abutment
