= Kurobe Dam =

Kurobe dam
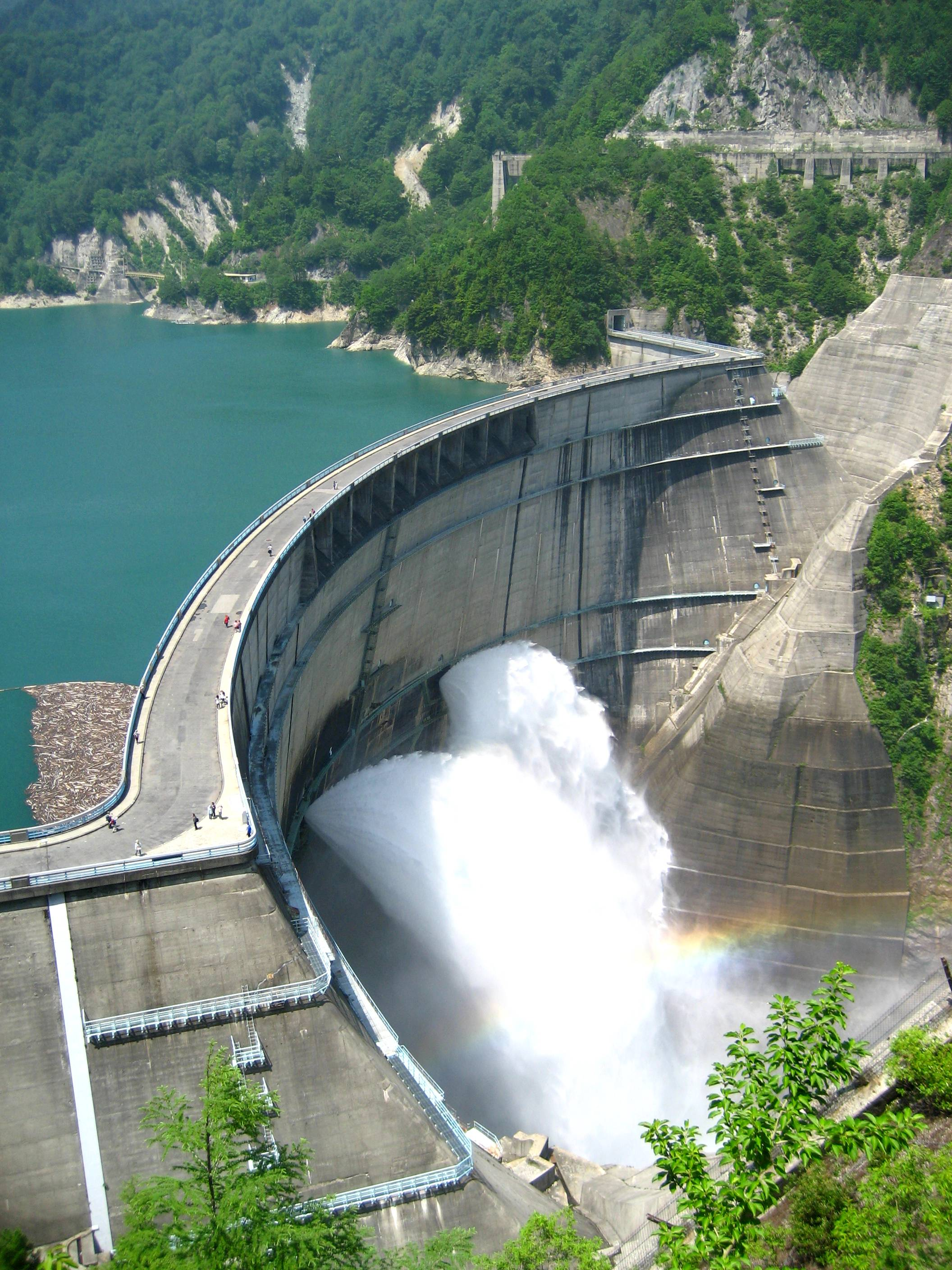
- Orifice floodgates open

- Location within Japan
- Official name: 黒部ダム
- Location: Toyama Prefecture
- Coordinates: 36°33′59″N 137°39′41″E
- Purpose: Power, water supply
- Status: Operational
- Construction began: 1956; 70 years ago
- Opening date: 1963; 63 years ago
- Construction cost: ¥51.3 billion $142.5 million (1963)
- Operator: Kansai Electric Power Company

Dam and spillways
- Type of dam: Arch, variable-radius (dome)
- Impounds: Kurobe River
- Height: 186 m (610 ft)
- Length: 492 m (1,614 ft)
- Width (crest): 8.1 m (27 ft)
- Width (base): 39.7 m (130 ft)
- Dam volume: 1,582,845 m^{3} (2,070,283 yd^{3})
- Spillway type: Service, uncontrolled overflow
- Spillway capacity: 906 m^{3}/s (32,000 cu ft/s)

Reservoir
- Creates: Kurobe Lake
- Total capacity: 199,285,175 m^{3} (161,563.121 acre⋅ft)
- Catchment area: 188.5 km^{2} (72.8 sq mi)
- Surface area: 3.49 km^{2} (1.35 sq mi)

Power Station
- Operator: Kansai Electric Power Company (KEPCO)
- Commission date: 1961–1973
- Type: Conventional
- Turbines: 4 x Pelton-type
- Installed capacity: 335 MW
- Annual generation: 1 billion kWh
- Website http://www.kurobe-dam.com/

The Kurobe Dam (黒部ダム), or Kuroyon Dam (黒四ダム), is a 186 m (610 ft) high variable-radius arch dam on the Kurobe River in Toyama Prefecture, Japan. The tallest dam in Japan, it supports the 335 MW Kurobe No. 4 Hydropower Plant and is owned by Kansai Electric Power Company. It was constructed between 1956 and 1963 at a cost of 51.3 billion yen. The project had taken the lives of 171 people by its completion.

== History ==
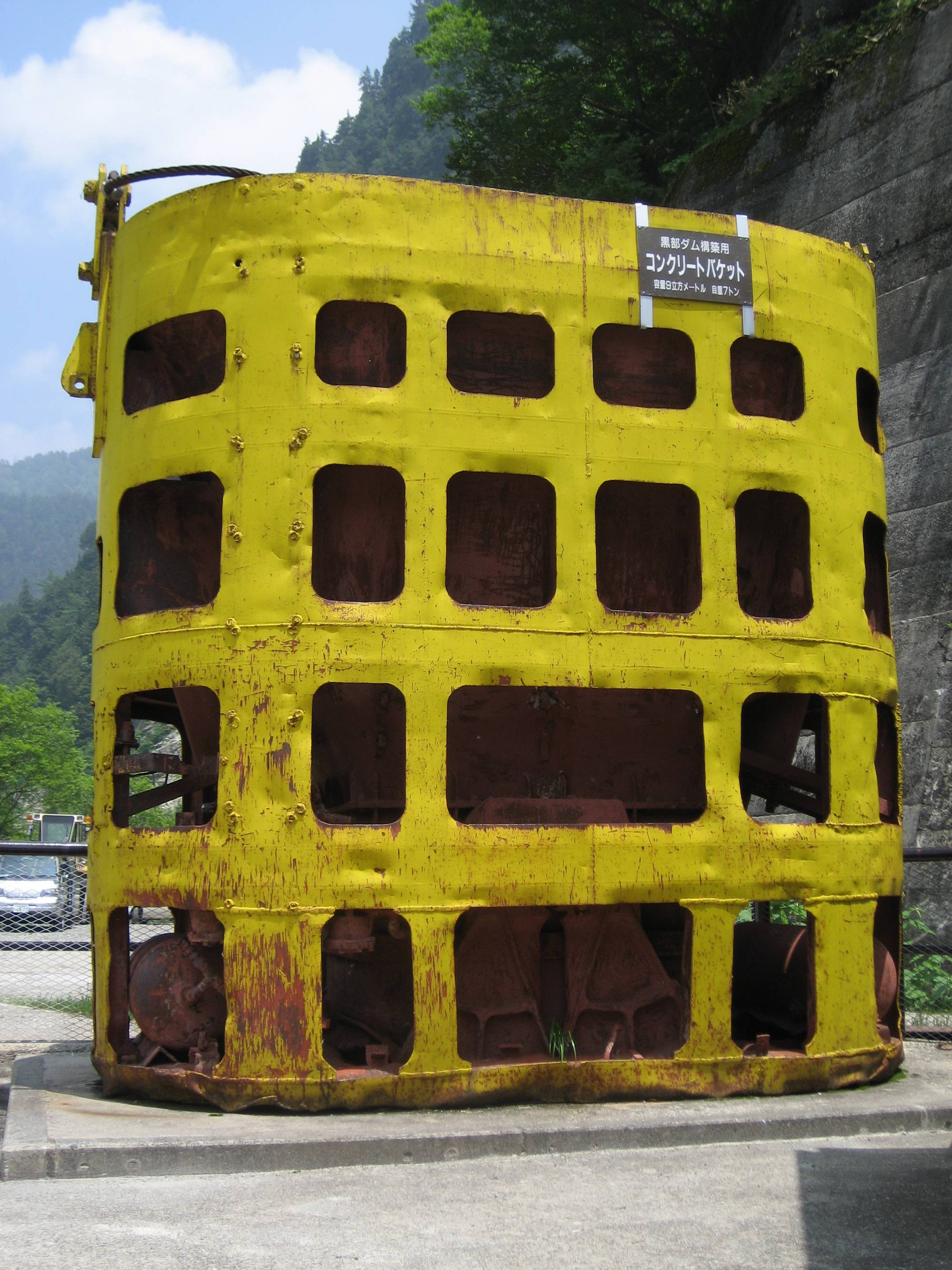
Concrete bucket used during construction

In 1951, the Kansai Electric Power Company was formed to provide electric power for the Kansai region of Japan. Shortly after their formation, the area suffered from drought, which caused power rationing. The drought, along with the rapid growth of post–World War II Japan, pushed the company to increase their generating capacity. After a series of geological and hydrological studies of the Kurobe River and Gorge, it was announced in late 1955 that the Kurobe Dam would be constructed.

In July 1956, construction on the dam began. Problems quickly arose while transporting material to the construction site as only one small railway existed through the narrow gorge. Kansai decided to construct the 5.4 km (3.4 mi) Kanden Tunnel under Mount Akazawa that could efficiently bring supplies from Ōmachi eastward towards the construction site. The tunnel's construction proved an arduous task, as a large fracture zone in the rock was encountered, which took seven months to repair. In September 1959, the first concrete for the dam was placed and by October next year, the reservoir had begun to fill.

The Kurobe No. 4 power station was built completely underground to protect it from the avalanches common in the gorge and also for nature-conservation purposes. By January 1961, two of Kurobe No. 4's Pelton turbines had begun operation at an initial capacity of 154 MW. In August 1962, the third turbine was in operation, and by June 1963, the dam was complete at a final cost of ¥ 51.3 billion ($142.5 million (1963)). In 1973, a fourth turbine was installed and became operational, bringing the power station's production capacity to 335 MW. The fourth turbine cost ¥ 1.4 billion yen ($5 million (1973)). The first two turbines were manufactured by Voith and the last two by Japan's Hitachi. The dam initiated the development of Japan's first 275kV transmission system as well, which allowed the transfer of electricity over greater distances.

== Specifications ==
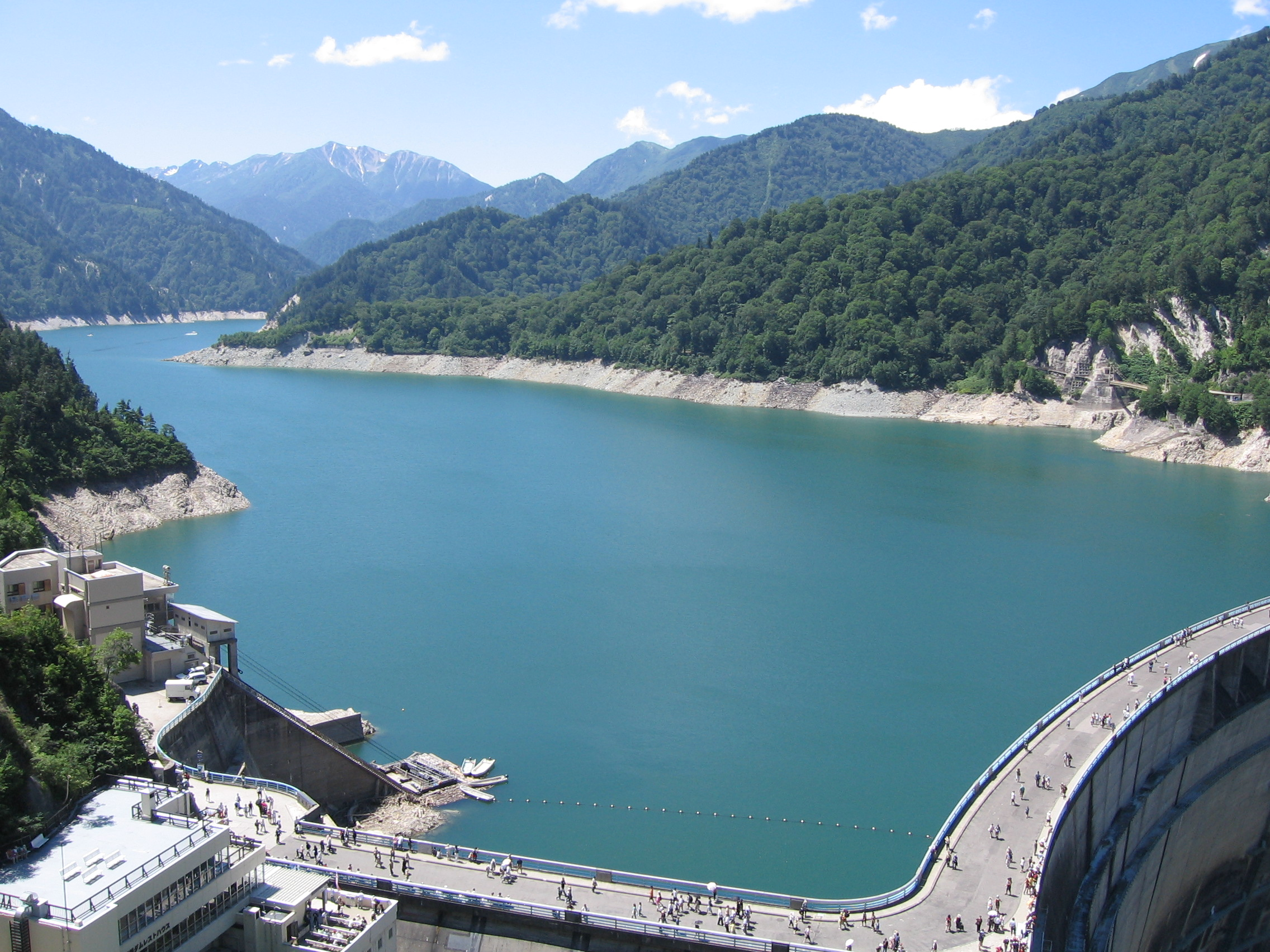
Lake Kurobe

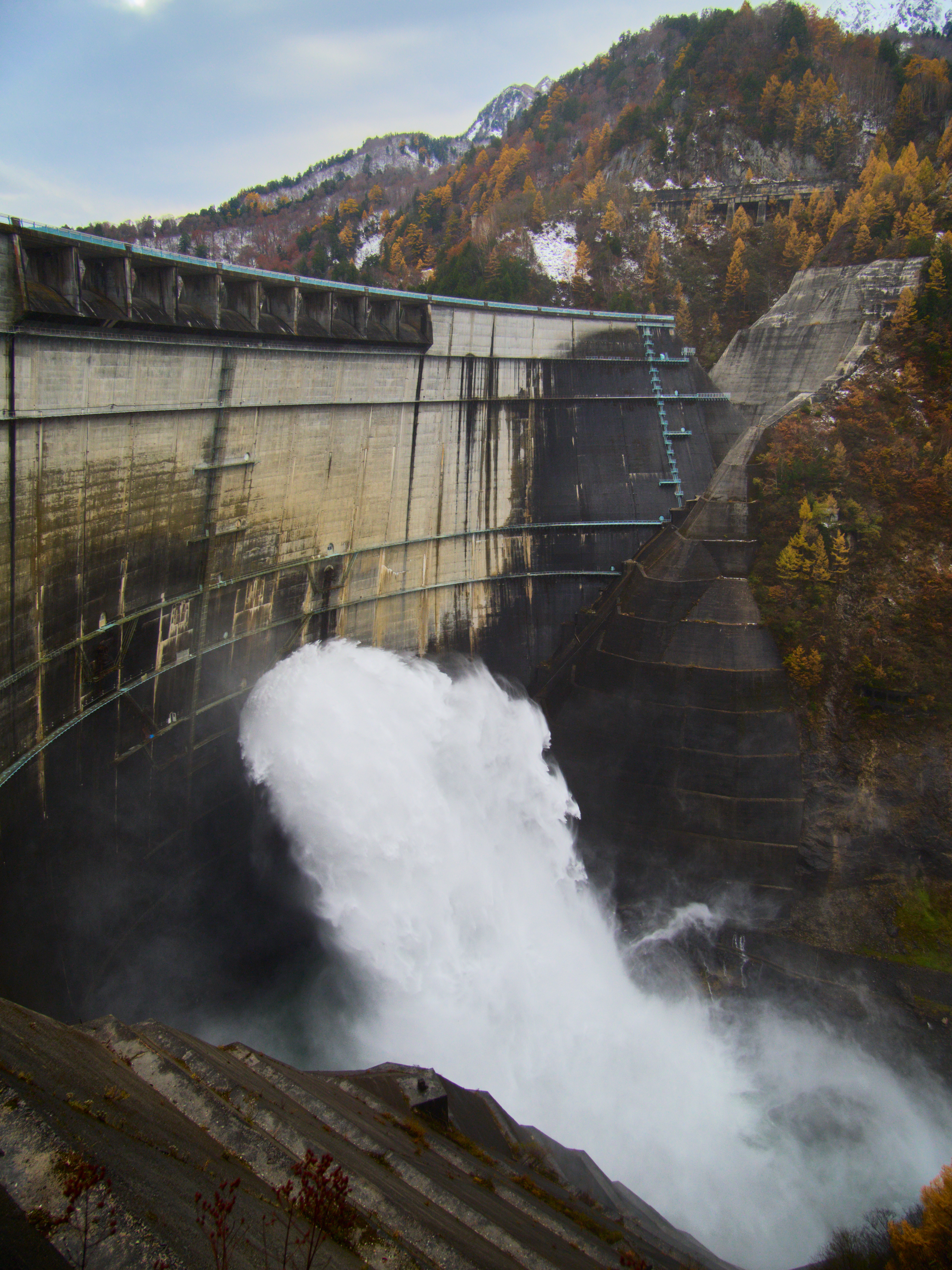
Water discharged through the outlet works of Kurobe Dam in autumn.

The Kurobe Dam is a 492 m (1,614 ft) long, 186 m (610 ft) high, variable-radius (dome) arch dam. The dam is 39.7 m (130 ft) wide at its base, 8.1 m (27 ft) wide at its crest, and contains 1,582,845 m^{3} (2,070,283 yd^{3}) of concrete. The dam is flanked and supported by two "wing" dams which form the abutments; the one on the left bank is 69 m (226 ft) long and the right is 56 m (184 ft). The dam withholds a reservoir with a capacity of 199,285,175 m^{3} (260,655,168 yd^{3}) of which 148,843,000 m^{3} (194,679,000 yd^{3}) is live (active or "useful") storage. The reservoir also has a catchment area of 188.5 km^{2} (72.8 sq mi) and surface area of 3.49 km^{2} (1.35 sq mi). The dam's spillway is on its crest and contains 10 11.5 m (38 ft) wide uncontrolled openings with a maximum discharge capacity of 906 m^{3}/s (32,000 cu ft/s). Three other openings exist in the dam's orifice, which consist of 1.5 m (4.9 ft) diameter pipes, two of which can discharge a maximum of 88 m^{3}/s (3,100 cu ft/s) each and the third 44 m^{3}/s (1,600 cu ft/s). The dam's crest elevation is 1,454 m (4,770 ft) above sea level, while the reservoir's normal operating level is 1,448 m (4,751 ft) and low level is considered 1,338 m (4,390 ft).

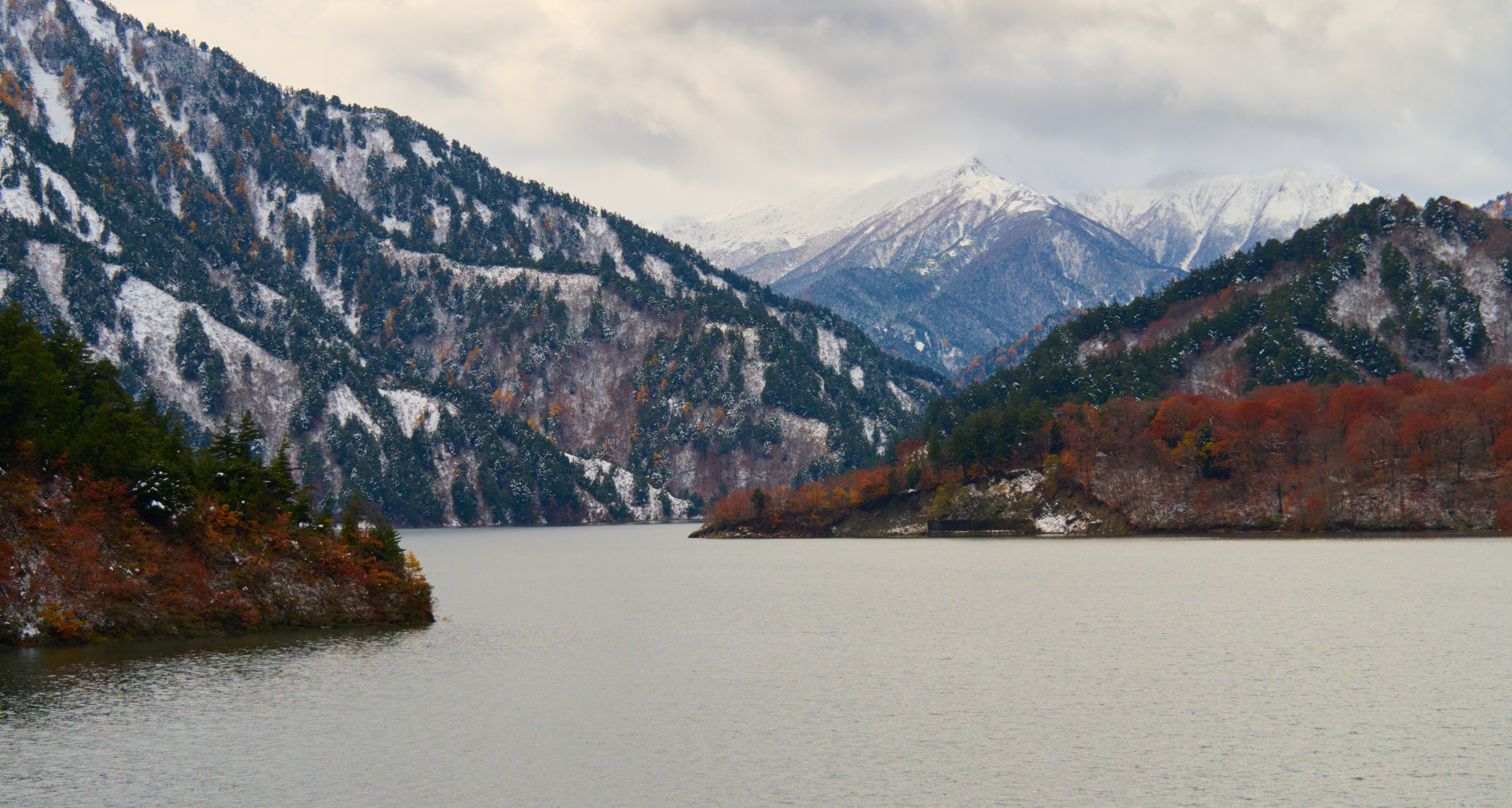
Kurobe Dam reservoir viewed from the dam, surrounded by mountains with autumn foliage and early snow.

The dam's power station, Kurobe No. 4, is located underground and contains four generators which are powered by Pelton turbines for a total installed capacity of 335 MW and average annual generation of 1 billion kWh. The power station is 22 m (72 ft) wide, 33 m (108 ft) high, and 117 m (384 ft) long. The penstock serving water to the power station is 10,909.6 m (35,793 ft) long and utilizes a maximum effective hydraulic head of 545.5 m (1,790 ft) while transferring a maximum of 72 m^{3}/s (2,500 cu ft/s) to the turbines. The plant's surge chamber is 145.6 m (478 ft) long and 5 m (16 ft) high.

== Access ==
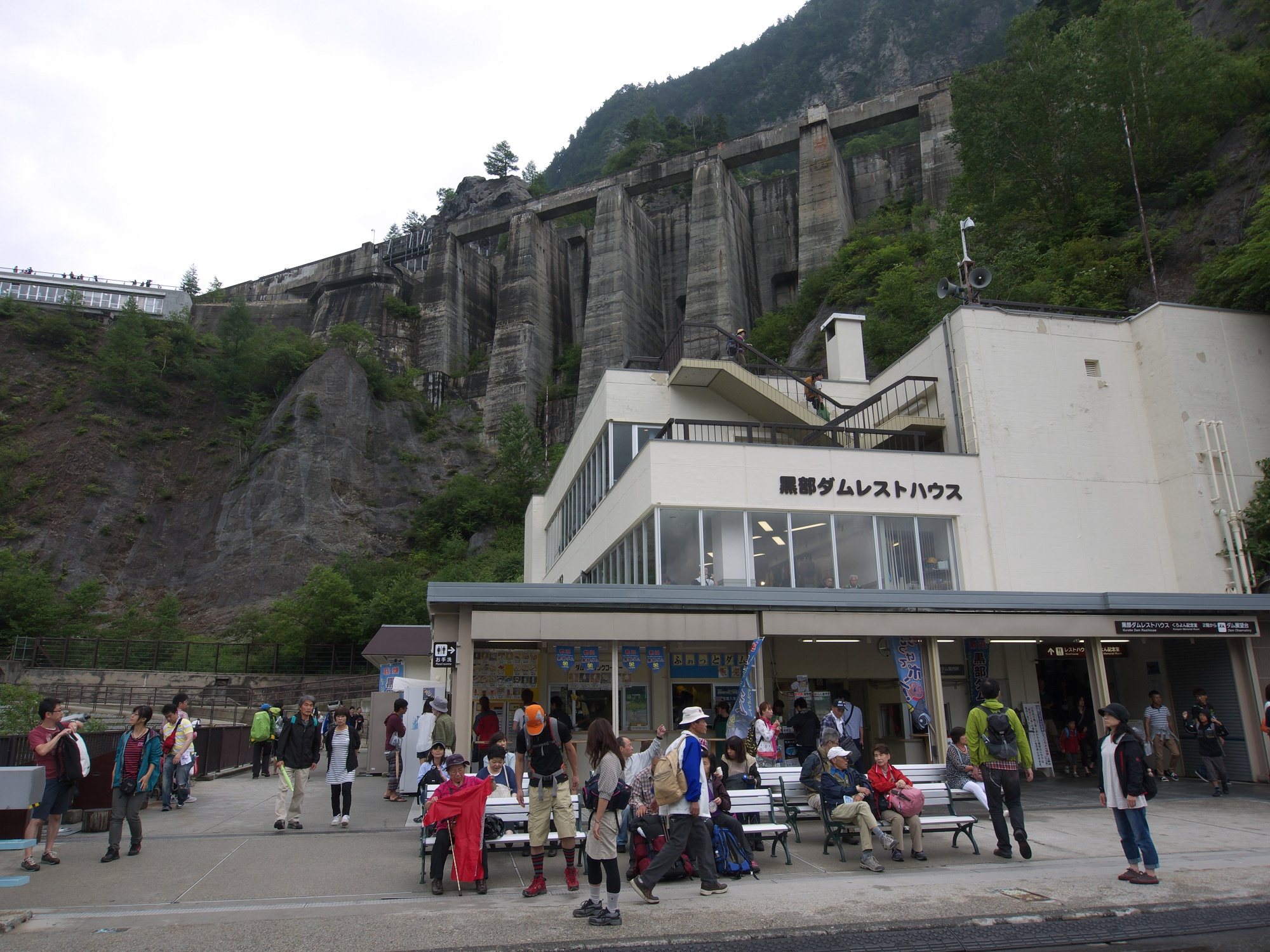
Visitors at Kurobe Dam

The Kurobe Dam is the most popular hydropower site in Japan and, between late June and mid-October, water is released from its spillway for onlookers. The surrounding Kurobe Gorge is popular as well and is accessible by the Tateyama Kurobe Alpine Route.

Starting from Toyama Station, visitors can take a combination of trains, cable cars, buses, and walking to access the dam. The whole trip from Toyama Station takes roughly four hours to complete one-way, and costs around 10,000 yen ($66.68 USD) in transportation fees. Various accommodations are available in Murodo area as well as near Tateyama Station, for those too tired to make the trip back down into Toyama City.

== In popular culture ==
The novel The Sun of Kurobe (黒部の太陽; Kurobe no Taiyō) dramatizes the construction of the dam. It was adapted into the 1968 film The Sands of Kurobe, which focuses on the perils that the construction of the dam and Kanden Tunnel entailed and other circumstances that took a high toll on human life.

The television series Project X: Chôsensha tachi (2000–2005) was also based on the dam's construction.

The final arc of the 2004 Tetsujin 28-go anime, which takes place in a fictionalized 1950s Japan, heavily involves the construction of the Kurobe Dam.

The 1961 kaiju film Mothra includes an action sequence filmed at the dam before its completion. Mothra's attack causes the dam to break.

Kurobe dam can be seen in the 1964 film Ghidorah, the Three-Headed Monster.

Kurobe Dam features prominently in the opening scene of the 1966 film Gamera vs. Barugon, in which Gamera attacks the facility's hydroelectric plant to obtain energy in the form of fire. The dam itself then bursts after Gamera collides with it twice while flying away.

The 2000 action thriller Whiteout was shot in and around Kurobe Dam, renamed Okutowa Dam in the film.

The mecha anime television series Kuromukuro (2016) is mainly set in a UN research facility located around the lake.

== See also ==
- Kurobe Gorge Railway
- Kurobe Senyō Railway
- List of power stations in Japan
