= Kurobe River =

River in Toyama Prefecture, Japan

Kurobe River Kurobe-gawa
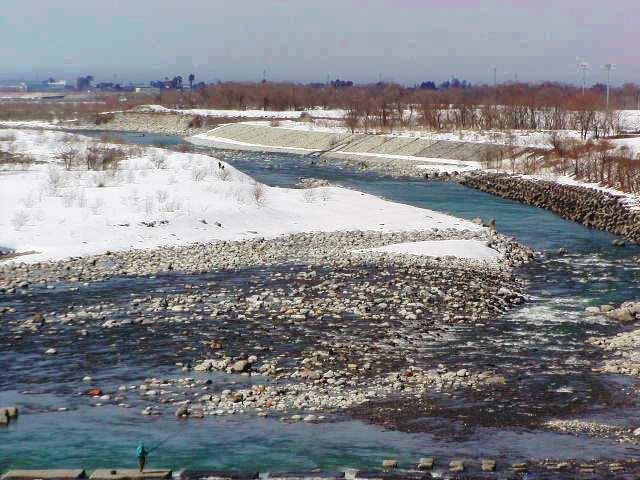
- The river as it flows through Kurobe, Toyama. (March 2005)

- Location within Japan
- Etymology: Japonic
- Native name: 黒部川 (Japanese)

Location
- Country: Japan
- State: Toyama
- Region: Chūbu
- District: Shimoniikawa
- Municipalities: Kurobe, Nyūzen, Toyama

Physical characteristics
- Source: Mount Washiba
  - location: Toyama, Toyama, Japan
  - coordinates: 36°24′10″N 137°36′18″E
  - elevation: 2,924 m (9,593 ft)
- Mouth: Sea of Japan
  - location: Kurobe and Nyūzen, Toyama, Japan
  - coordinates: 36°55′17″N 137°25′28″E
  - elevation: 0 m (0 ft)
- Length: 85 km (53 mi)
- Basin size: 667 km^{2} (258 sq mi)
- Discharge
  - average: 12.18 m^{3}/s (430 cu ft/s)

The Kurobe River (黒部川, Kurobe-gawa) is a Class A river in Toyama Prefecture, Japan. The river is 86 kilometres (53 mi) in length and has a watershed of 689 square kilometres (266 mi^{2}).

The river rises from Mount Washiba in the Hida Mountains and carves the deep valley known as the Kurobe Gorge. It comes out of the mountains at Unazuki and forms an alluvial fan which directly sinks into the Sea of Japan.

== Tributary ==
- Kuronagi River

== See also ==
- Kurobe Dam
- Unazuki Dam
