= Unazuki Station =

Railway station in Kurobe, Toyama prefecture, Japan

Coordinates: 36°48′54.06″N 137°35′9.46″E

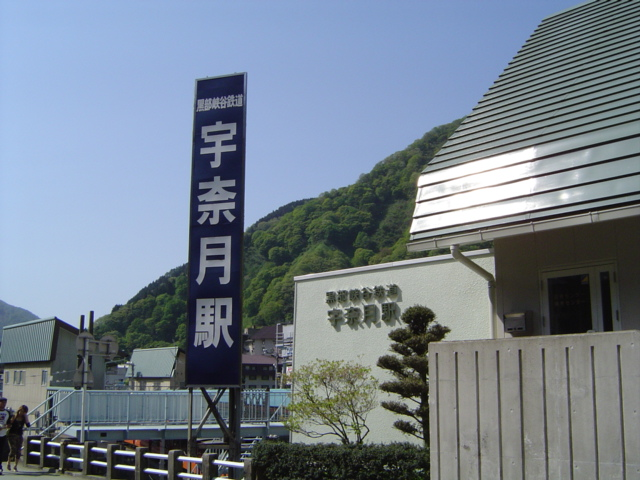
Billboard

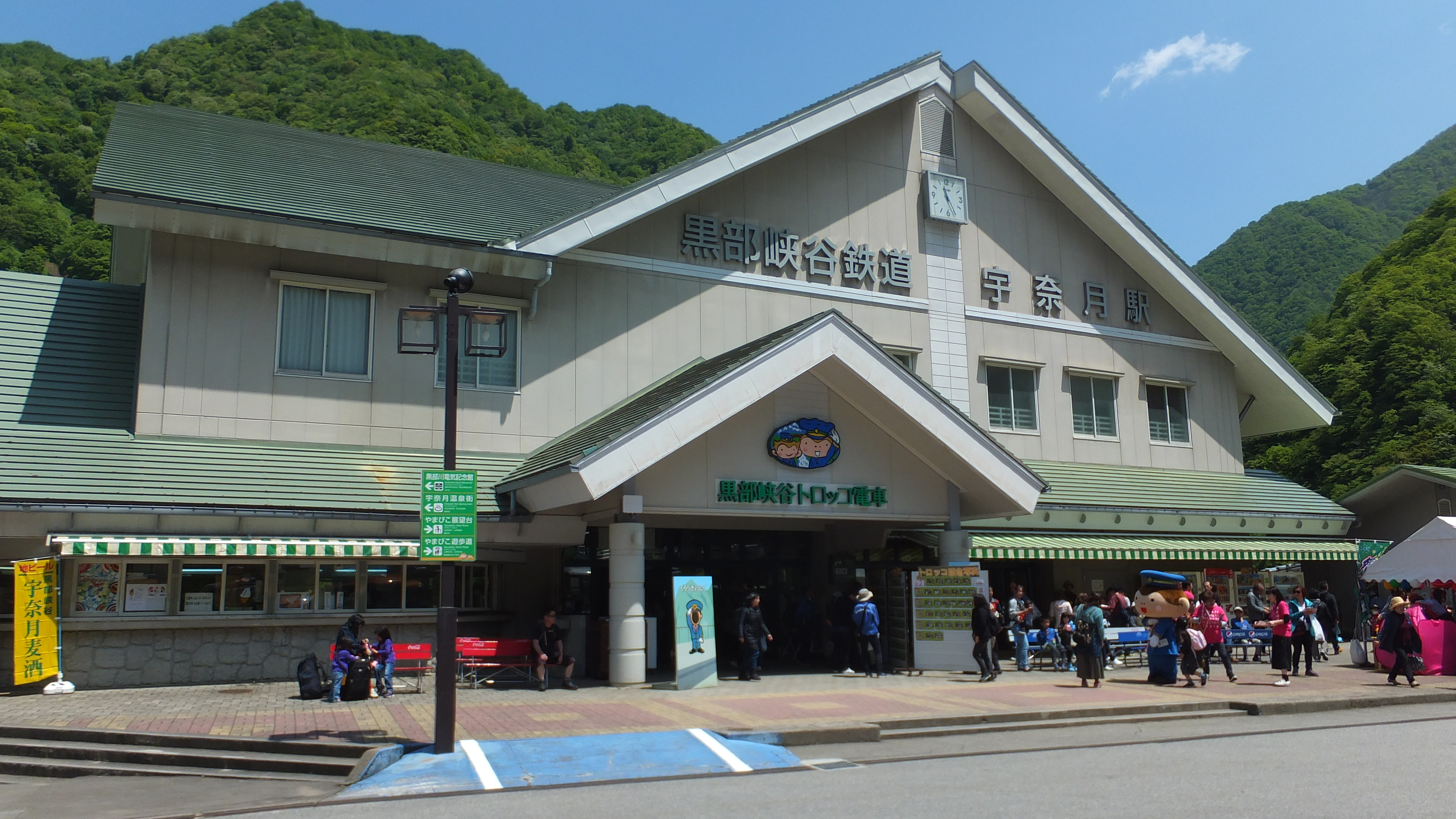
Station building

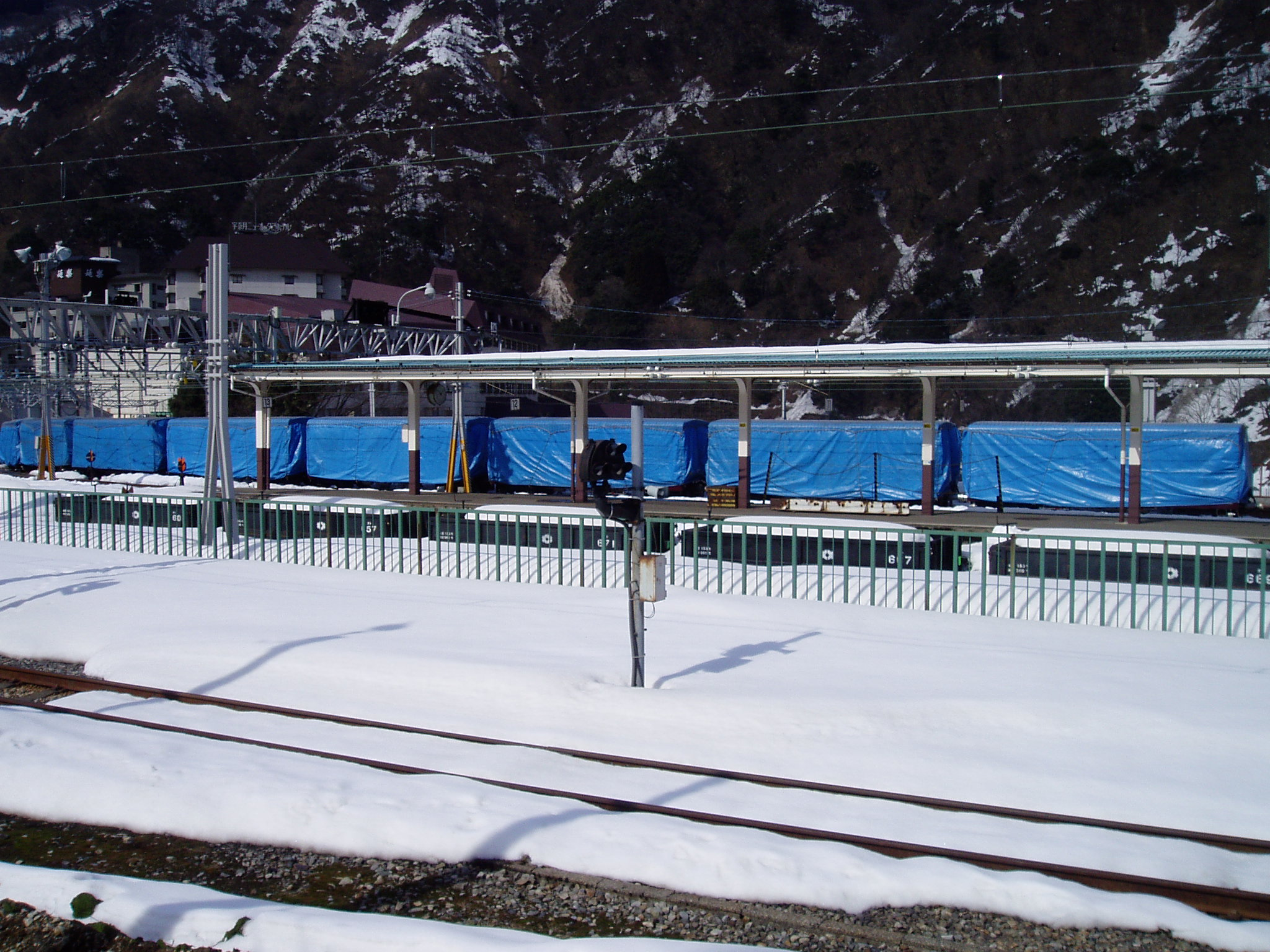
Unazuki Station is closed in winter. Cars are covered with blue plastic sheets.

Unazuki Station (宇奈月駅, Unazuki-eki) is a railway station in Kurobe, Toyama, Japan, operated by the Kurobe Gorge Railway.

== Line ==
Unazuki Station is served by the Kurobe Gorge Railway Main Line.

== Station layout ==
The station has one island platform with two tracks and side tracks on ground. The platforms are located lower than the station building. There are many parking lots in front of the station.

== Adjacent stations ==
Kurobe Gorge Railway
main line

train for Kansai Electric Power Company

Unazuki Station - Yanagibashi Station

Passenger train

Unazuki Station - Kuronagi Station

== History ==
The line opened in 1927 as an industrial railway operated by Nippon Electric Power Company (日本電力). The station opened on 16 November 1953, operated by Kansai Electric Power Company. From 1 July 1971, the station came under the operation of the Kurobe Gorge Railway.

== Surrounding area ==
It takes about ten minutes between Toyama Chihō Railway Main Line Unazuki Onsen Station and this station.

- Unazuki Onsen
- Kurobe River Electric Power Museum
- Serene Art Museum
