= Kansai Electric Power Company =

Japanese electric utility company

The Kansai Electric Power Company, Incorporated

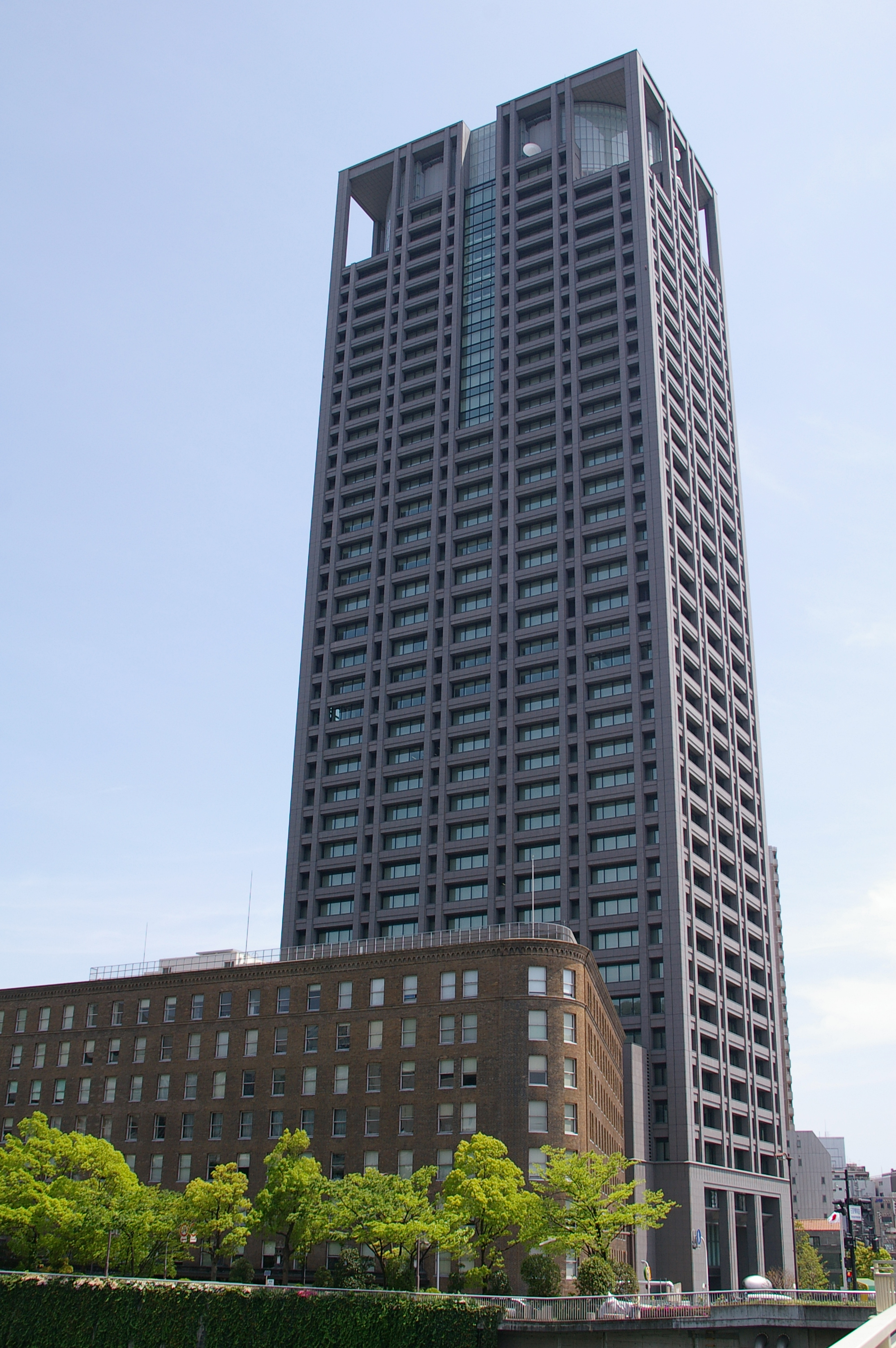
- Native name: 関西電力株式会社
- Romanized name: Kansai Denryoku kabushiki gaisha
- Type: Public (Kabushiki gaisha)
- Traded as: TYO: 9503; OSE: 9503 (~2013); NAG: 9503 (~2014); Nikkei 225 component; TOPIX Large70 component
- Industry: Electric utility
- Predecessor: Kansai Haiden; Nippon Hassoden KK
- Founded: Osaka, Japan (1 May 1951; 75 years ago)
- Headquarters: Nakanoshima, Kita-ku, Osaka, Japan
- Area served: Kansai region (ex. Fukuura and Ako in Hyōgo Prefecture); West of Mihama in Fukui Prefecture; Southern area of Mie Prefecture; Part of the area of Sekigahara, Gifu Prefecture
- Key people: Sadayuki Sakakibara (Chairman); Nozomu Mori (President)
- Products: Electrical power
- Revenue: ▲¥2,811,424 million (FY 2011)
- Operating income: ▼¥-229,388 million (FY 2011)
- Net income: ▼¥-242,257 million (FY 2011)
- Total assets: ▲¥7,521,352 million (FY 2011)
- Total equity: ▼¥1,529,843 million (FY 2011)
- Owner: Osaka Municipal Government (7.64% directly, 1.73% through Osaka Metro); Kobe Municipal Government (3.06%)
- Number of employees: 32,961 (consolidated, as of 31 March 2012)
- Subsidiaries: Kansai Transmission & Distribution, Inc.; OPTAGE Inc.; Kansai Amenix Co.
- Website: kepco.co.jp

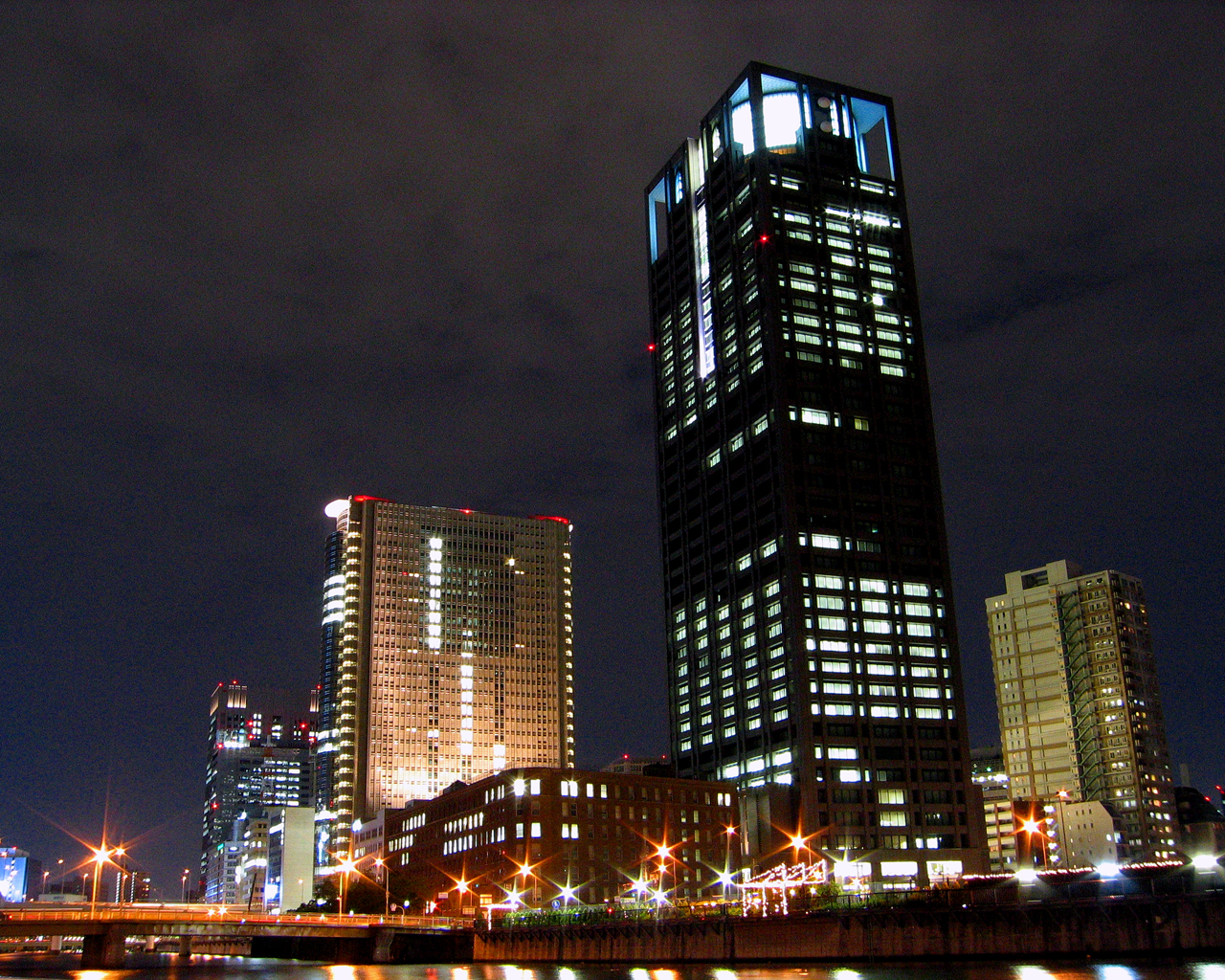
The top of the building is lit up like a light bulb at night

The Kansai Electric Power Company, Incorporated (Japanese: 関西電力株式会社, Hepburn: Kansai Denryoku kabushiki gaisha; KEPCO), also known as Kanden (関電), is an electric utility with its operational area of Kansai region, Japan (including the Keihanshin megalopolis).

The Kansai region is Japan's second-largest industrial area, and in normal times, its most nuclear-reliant. Before the Fukushima nuclear disaster, a band of 11 nuclear reactors – north of the major cities Osaka and Kyoto – supplied almost 50 percent of the region's power. As of January 2012, only one of those reactors was still running. In March 2012, the last reactor was taken off the power grid.

== Power plants ==
Kansai Electric Power Company has 164 plants with a total production capacity of 35,760 MW.

=== Nuclear ===
Name	Location	Generation capacity (MW)
Mihama	Fukui	1,666
Ōi	Fukui	4,710
Takahama	Fukui	3,392

=== Thermal ===
Name	Generation capacity (MW)
Akō	1,200
Aioi	1,125
Himeji-1	1,442
Himeji-2	2,550
Takasago	900
Nanko, Osaka	1,800
Maizuru	900
Gobō Thermal Power Plant	1,800
Sakai	2,000
Tanagawa, Misaki	1,200
Kainan	2,100
Miyazu	750

=== Hydro ===
Name	Generation capacity (MW)
Kurobe-4 (Kurobe Dam)	335
Others (147 plants)	818

== Accidents and incidents ==
=== Mihama accident in 2004 ===
On 9 August 2004, KEPCO reported that five of its employees were killed by a steam burst in the turbines housing building, at the Mihama Nuclear Power Plant in Fukui Prefecture. The burst, according to KEPCO, was due to the neglect of mandated safety checks and there was no release of radioactivity.

=== 2006 ===
On 22 March 2006, in Ōi Nuclear Power Plant, at the waste incineration facility area, where ash is packed in steel barrels, a fire broke out. Two workers were admitted to a hospital after inhaling smoke, but not in critical condition. No radiation leakage was monitored.

=== 2011 aftermath ===
The Kansai region is Japan's second-largest industrial area, and in normal times, its most nuclear-reliant. Before the Fukushima nuclear disaster, a band of 11 nuclear reactors – north of the major cities Osaka and Kyoto – supplied almost 50 percent of the region's power. But as of January 2012, only one of those reactors is still running. Meanwhile, power company employees are racing to reassure Japanese that plants are safe and necessary. In 2012, officials from Kansai Electric Power Co., "have gone door to door in towns that host its nuclear plants, conducting polls and answering questions".

== Corruption scandal ==
Eiji Moriyama, the former deputy mayor of Takahama now deceased, was the primary "fixer" between Kepco and businesses in Takahama. Beginning as early as 1987, Moriyama was a conduit for funneling cash and gifts to Kepco officials in exchange for kickbacks and contracts to real estate and construction-related firms. Moriyama received "consulting fees" for his help.

The earliest indication of the corrupt relations between Kepco and local businesses appeared in a report from the taxation authorities, regarding unreported income on "idle lands". This was followed by a report in 2011 that Kepco had sold scrap metal to a local company at below market value.

In 2012 it was revealed that a member of the town assembly of Takahama, Fukui, Tomio Yamamoto, had received as president of the real estate company OHC Fukui, over 100 million yen for the rent of an unused factory over four years from 2006 to 2010 from a subsidiary of Kansai Electric Power Co. (KEPCO) The factory was used for storage, but the rent was unusually high, almost double the market price. The money was apparently paid in return for promoting nuclear power. In September 2010 an opinion statement to reactivate the nuclear reactors was proposed by Akio Awano, the vice speaker of the town assembly. Yamamoto and two other town assembly members did sign the proposal before it was submitted to the assembly.

In 2014, the Ministry of Economy, Trade and Industry cited Kepco for restraint of trade (社宅) in the purchase of transmission line equipment. After review, 240 employees were found to have been involved in the price rigging, and the company dismissed four vice presidents and four executive officers.

Overall, more than 380 cases were discovered where money and gifts had been exchanged for the awarding of contracts to businesses connected to Moriyama, including pay-outs to board members and the company's president. In response to these revelations, Kepco Chairman Makoto Yagi resigned in 2019, and Kepco president Shigeki Iwane resigned in 2020. Takashi Morimoto, executive vice president, became the new president.

== Opposition to the dependence on nuclear power ==
In August 2011 citizens of the prefecture Shiga, at the banks of Lake Biwa, started a lawsuit at the Otsu District Court, and asked a court order to prevent the restart of seven reactors operated by Kansai Electric Power Company, in the prefecture Fukui.

On 27 February 2012 three Kansai cities, Kyoto, Osaka and Kobe, jointly asked Kansai Electric Power Co. to break its dependence on nuclear power. In a letter to KEPCO they also requested to disclose information on the demand and supply of electricity, and for lower and stable prices. The three cities were stockholders of the plant: Osaka owned 9% of the shares, while Kobe had 3% and Kyoto 0.45%. Toru Hashimoto, the mayor of Osaka, announced a proposal to minimize the dependence on nuclear power for the shareholders meeting in June 2012.

On 18 March 2012 the city of Osaka decided as largest shareholder of Kansai Electric Power Co, that at the next shareholders-meeting in June 2012 it would demand a series of changes:

- that Kansai Electric would be split into two companies, separating power generation from power transmission
- a reduction of the number of the utility's executives and employees.
- the implementation of absolutely secure measurements to ensuring the safety of the nuclear facilities.
- the disposing of spent fuel.
- the installation of new kind of thermal power generation to secure non-nuclear supply of energy.
- selling all unnecessary assets including the stock holdings of KEPCO.

In this action Osaka had secured the support of two other cities and shareholders: Kyoto and Kobe, but with their combined voting-rights of 12.5 percent they were not certain of the ultimate outcome, because for this two-thirds of the shareholders would be needed to agree to revise the corporate charter.

At a meeting held on 10 April 2012 by the "energy strategy council", formed by the city of Osaka and the governments of the prefectures, it became clear that at the end of the fiscal year 2011 some 69 employees of Kansai Electric Power Company were former public servants. "Amakudari" is the Japanese name for this practice: hiring officials that formerly controlled and supervised the firm: among these people were:

- 13 ex-officials of the Ministry of Land, Infrastructure, Transport and Tourism
- 3 ex-officials of the Ministry of Economy, Trade and Industry,
- 2 ex-officials of the Ministry of the Environment,
- 16 former policemen,
- 13 former civil engineers.
- 16 former policemen,
- 10 ex-firefighters

Besides this, it became known that Kansai Electric had done about 600 external financial donations, to a total sum of about 1.695 billion yen:

- 70 donations were paid to local governments: to a total of 699 million yen
- 100 donations to public-service organizations: 443 million yen,
- 430 donations to various organizations and foundations: a total of 553 million yen

During this meeting some 8 conditions were compiled, that needed to be fulfilled before a restart of the No.3 and No.4 reactors Oi Nuclear Power Plant:

- the consent of the local people and government within 100 kilometer from the plant
- the installation of a new independent regulatory agency
- a nuclear safety agreement
- the establishment of new nuclear safety standards
- stress tests and evaluations based on these new safety rules

On 14 September 2013, the day before the no. 4 Oi reactor was scheduled to closed down for regular inspections, some 9000 demonstrators gathered at the Kameido Chuo Park and later marched close to JR Kinshicho Station and the Tokyo Skytree. They called for an end of Japan's dependency on nuclear power. The day after the Oi-reactor closed down, leaving Japan without any nuclear power for the third time in 40 years.

== Business results ==
Over the business year 2011-2012, which ends in March, Kansai Electric Power Co. was expected to suffer a loss of 250 billion yen or more, because of the growing fuel cost for thermal power generation. In the business year 2009 the net loss was 8.7 billion yen.

== See also ==
- Osaka Science Museum
- Kanden Tunnel Trolleybus
- Kurobe Senyō Railway
