= Unazuki Onsen =

Hot spring resort

Unazuki Onsen 宇奈月温泉
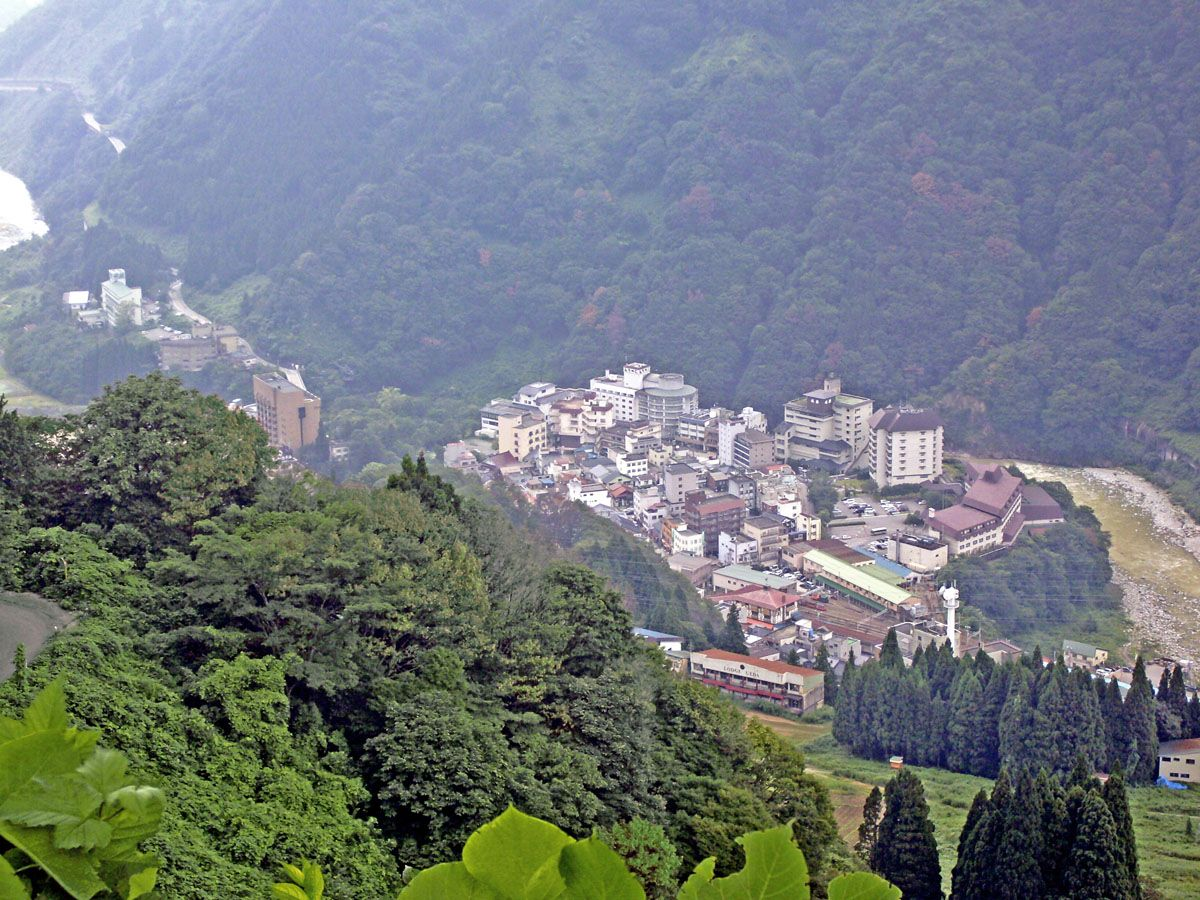
- Unazuki Onsens

- Location within Japan
- Location: Kurobe, Toyama, Japan
- Coordinates: 36°49′1.5″N 137°34′53.5″E
- Elevation: 100 m (330 ft)
- Type: Ordinary（単純泉）

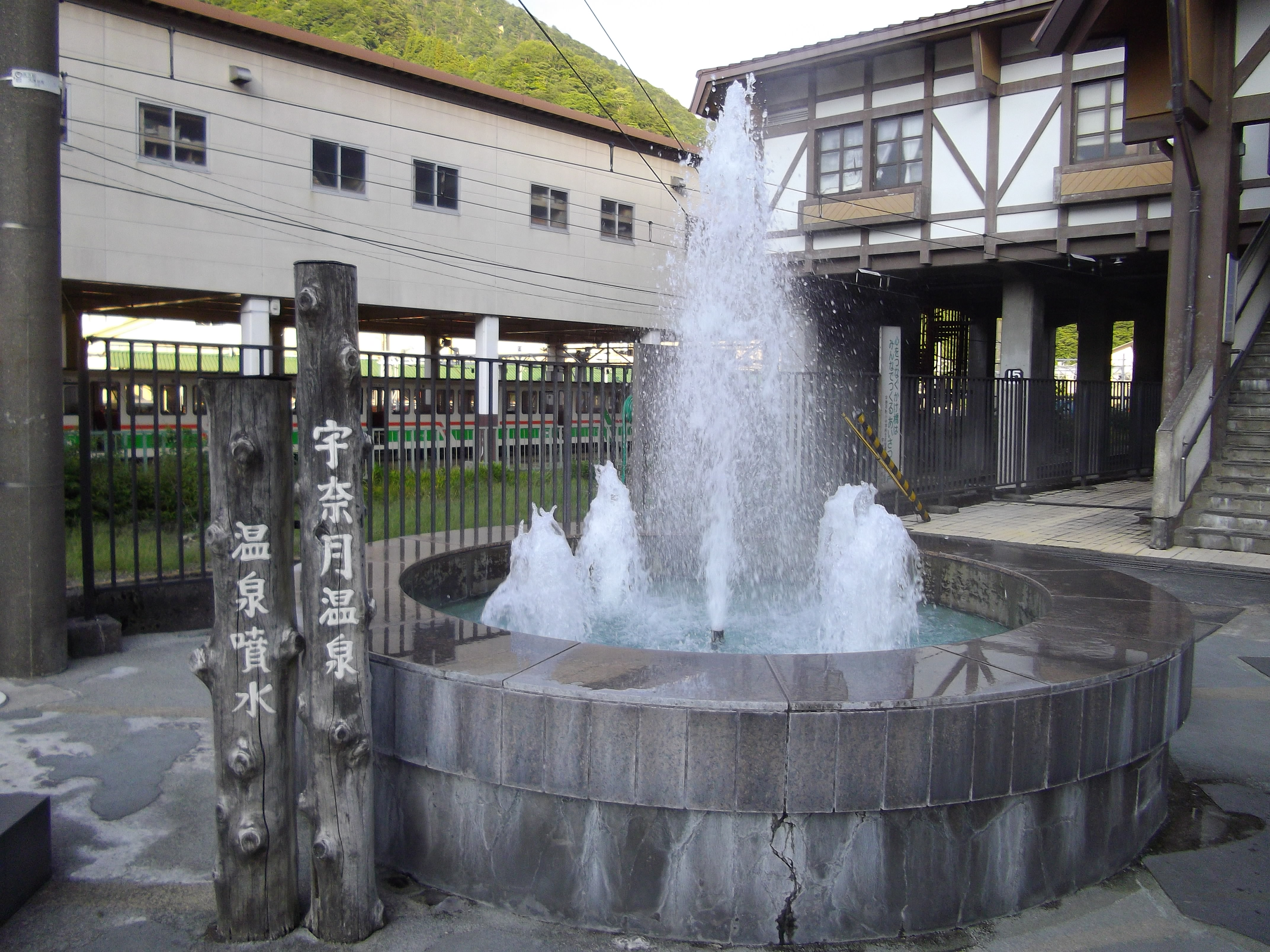
Unazuki-onsen hot spring fountain

Unazuki Onsen (宇奈月温泉, Unazuki onsen) is a hot spring resort located in the city of Kurobe, Toyama Prefecture, Japan, at the entrance of the Kurobe Gorge.

== History and description ==
Unazuki Onsen was opened in the 1923 Taisho period. Over the years, many poets and writers have visited the thermal springs. There are Ryokan and hotels along the Kurobe River. Unazuki onsen is a sightseeing base of Kurobe Gorge Railway. Unazuki onsen shares the hot spring water with the nearby Kuronagi Onsen by a 7 km water pipe.

Unazuki Onsen Ski Resort was opened in 1956.

Nearby in the Unazuki International Center is the Selene Museum of Art. The collection features work by Japanese artists; much of the work focuses on the natural environment of the Kurobe Gorge.

Along the Kurobe River, there are 20 spring sources where the mineral water flows from the ground.

== Water profile ==
The clear mineral water emerges from the source at 98 °C, pH8.15; the water has a mild sulfur smell.

A communal soaking pool is located in front of the railway station, along with a foot bath.

== Access ==
=== Railway ===
- West Japan Railway Company (JR West) – Hokuriku Shinkansen
  - Kurobe-Unazukionsen
  - Shin-Kurobe
- Toyama Chihō Railway
  - Unazuki Onsen
- Kurobe Gorge Railway

== See also ==
- Kurobe Gorge
- Unazuki, Toyama
