= Shimoniikawa District =

District in Toyama prefecture, Japan

Coordinates: 36.914°N 137.616°E

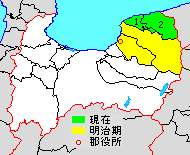
Map showing original extent of Shimoniikawa District in Toyama Prefecture: * yellow - areas formerly within the district borders during the early Meiji period * green - current borders: 1. Asahi-machi; 2. Nyūzen-machi

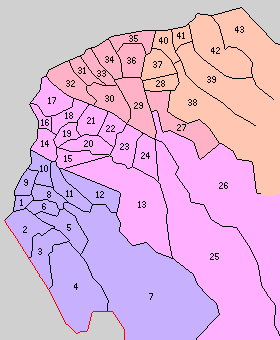
Colored areas are in this district.

Shimoniikawa (下新川郡, Shimoniikawa-gun) is a district located in Toyama Prefecture, Japan.

As of 2003, the district has an estimated population of 49,118 with a density of 77.09 persons per km^{2}. The total area is 637.19 km^{2}.

== Municipalities ==
The district consists of two towns:

- Asahi (Note: Classified as a town.)
- Nyūzen

== History ==
=== Recent mergers ===
- On March 31, 2006 - The town of Unazuki was absorbed by the former city of Kurobe to form the new city of Kurobe.
