= Tochiya Station =

Railway station in Kurobe, Toyama Prefecture, Japan

Tochiya Station 栃屋駅
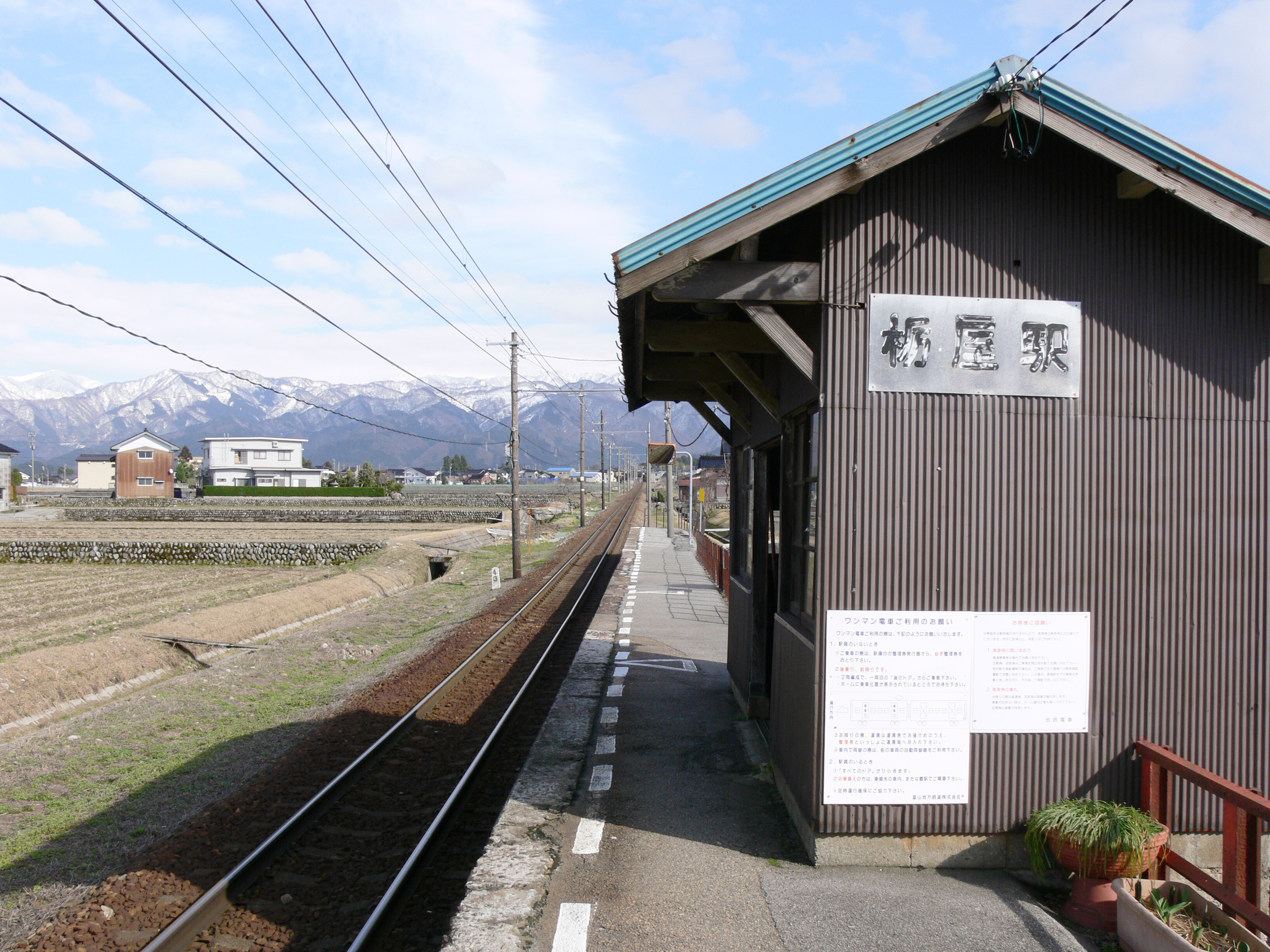
- Tochiya Station in March 2009

General information
- Location: 953 Tochiya, Unatsuki-machi, Kurobe-shi, Toyama-ken 938-0864; Japan
- Coordinates: 36.8696°N 137.5059°E
- Operator: Toyama Chihō Railway
- Line: ■ Toyama Chihō Railway Main Line
- Distance: 42.8 from Dentetsu-Toyama
- Platforms: 1 side platform
- Tracks: 1

Other information
- Status: Unstaffed
- Website: Official website

History
- Opened: 5 November 1922

Passengers
- FY2015: 77 daily
Location
- Location within Japan

Tochiya Station (栃屋駅, Tochiya-eki) is a railway station in the city of Kurobe, Toyama, Japan, operated by the private railway operator Toyama Chihō Railway.

== Lines ==
Tochiya Station is served by the Toyama Chihō Railway Main Line, and is 42.8 kilometers from the starting point of the line at Dentetsu-Toyama.

== Station layout ==
The station has one ground-level side platform serving a single bi-directional track. The station is unattended.

== History ==
Tochiya Station was opened on 5 November 1922.

== Adjacent stations ==
«	Service	»
Toyama Chihō Railway Main Line
Limited Express: Does not stop at this station
Wakaguri	Rapid Express	Urayama
Wakaguri	Express	Urayama
Wakaguri	Local	Urayama

== Surrounding area ==
- Toyama Kogyo Co Ltd

== See also ==
- List of railway stations in Japan
