= Unazuki, Toyama =

Dissolved municipality in Toyama prefecture, Japan

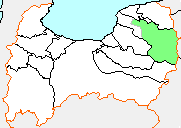
Location of the former town of Unazuki in Toyama Prefecture

Unazuki (宇奈月町, Unazuki-machi) was a town in Shimoniikawa District, Toyama Prefecture, Japan. This town was famous for its hot springs named Unazuki-Onsen.

As of 2003, the town had an estimated population of 6,178 and a population density of 18.19 persons per km^{2}. The total area was 339.58 km^{2}.

On March 31, 2006, Unazaki was merged into the expanded city of Kurobe.
