= Urayama Station =

Railway station in Kurobe, Toyama Prefecture, Japan

Urayama Station 浦山駅
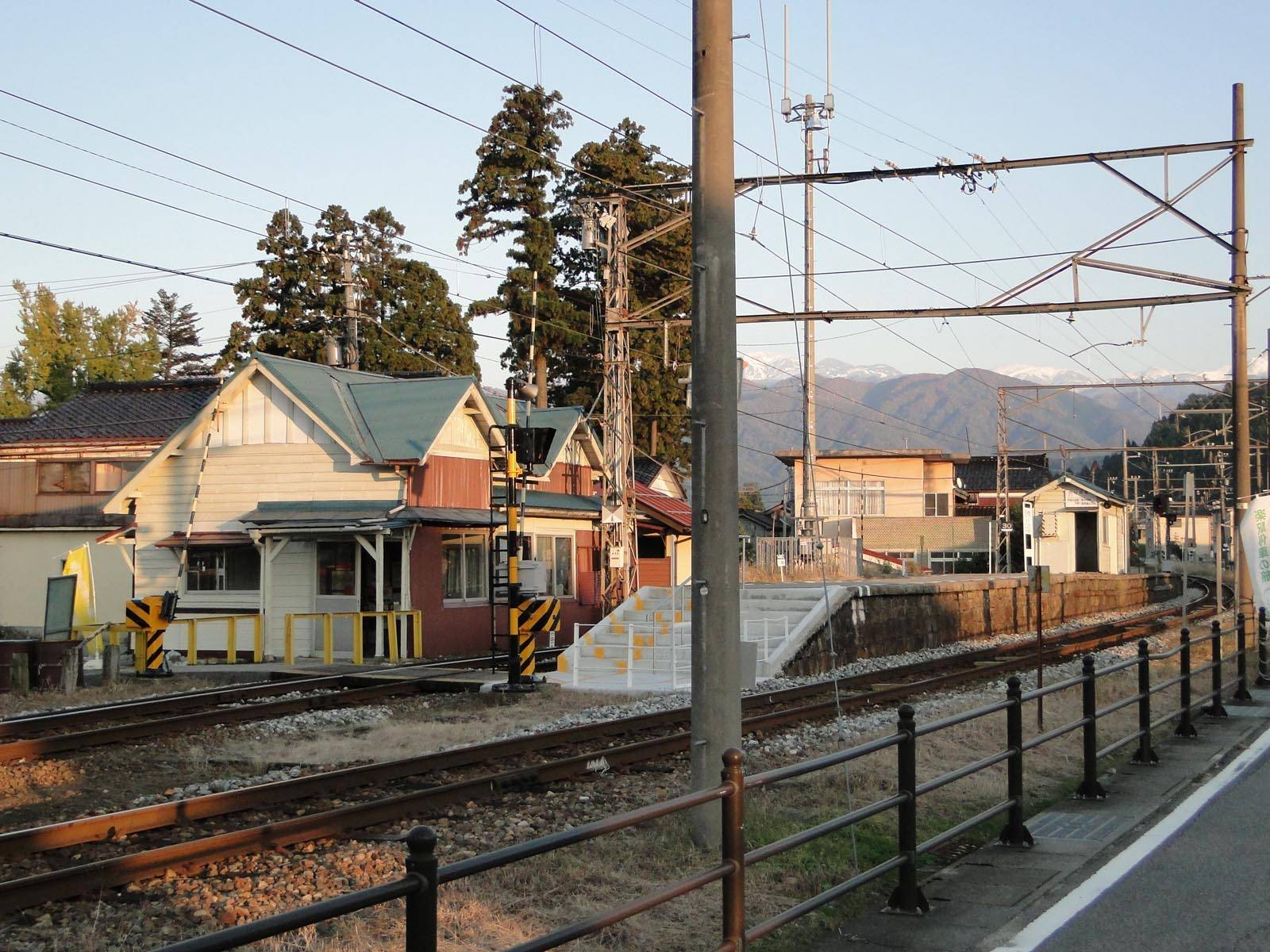
- Urayama Station in November 2010

General information
- Location: 623-2 Unatsuki-Urayama, Kurobe-shi, Toyama-ken 938-0862; Japan
- Coordinates: 36.8636°N 137.5193°E
- Operator: Toyama Chihō Railway
- Line: ■ Toyama Chihō Railway Main Line
- Distance: 44.3 from Dentetsu-Toyama
- Platforms: 1 island platform
- Tracks: 2

Other information
- Status: Unstaffed
- Website: Official website

History
- Opened: 5 November 1922

Passengers
- FY2015: 261 daily
Location
- Location within Japan

Urayama Station (浦山駅, Urayama-eki) is a railway station in the city of Kurobe, Toyama, Japan, operated by the private railway operator Toyama Chihō Railway.

== Lines ==
Urayama Station is served by the Toyama Chihō Railway Main Line, and is 44.3 kilometers from the starting point of the line at Dentetsu-Toyama.

== Station layout ==
The station has one ground-level island platform serving two tracks. The station is unattended.

== History ==
Urayama Station was opened on 5 November 1922.

== Adjacent stations ==
«	Service	»
Toyama Chihō Railway Main Line
Shin-Kurobe	Limited Express	Aimoto
Tochiya	Rapid Express	Oritateguchi
Tochiya	Express	Oritateguchi
Tochiya	Local	Oritateguchi

== Passenger statistics ==
In fiscal 2015, the station was used by 161 passengers daily.

== Surrounding area ==
- Unazuki Elementary School

== See also ==
- List of railway stations in Japan
