= Wakaguri Station =

Railway station in Kurobe, Toyama Prefecture, Japan

Wakaguri Station 若栗駅
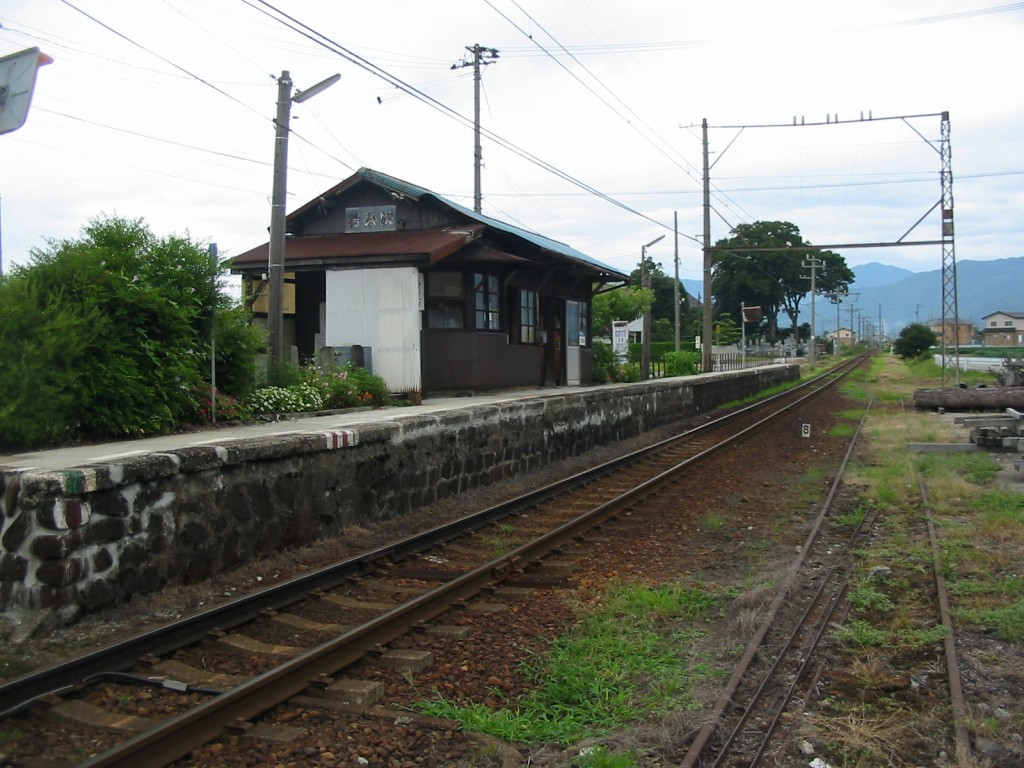
- Wakaguri Station in August 2008

General information
- Location: 1860 Wakaguri, Kurobe-shi, Toyama-ken 938-0802; Japan
- Coordinates: 36.8713°N 137.4933°E
- Operator: Toyama Chihō Railway
- Line: ■ Toyama Chihō Railway Main Line
- Distance: 41.7 from Dentetsu-Toyama
- Platforms: 1 side platform
- Tracks: 1

Other information
- Status: Unstaffed
- Website: Official website

History
- Opened: 5 November 1922

Passengers
- FY2015: 67 daily
Location
- Location within Japan

Wakaguri Station (若栗駅, Wakaguri-eki) is a railway station in the city of Kurobe, Toyama, Japan, operated by the private railway operator Toyama Chihō Railway.

== Lines ==
Wakaguri Station is served by the Toyama Chihō Railway Main Line, and is 41.7 kilometers from the starting point of the line at Dentetsu-Toyama.

== Station layout ==
The station has one ground-level side platform serving a single bi-directional track. The station is unattended.

== History ==
Wakaguri Station was opened on 5 November 1922.

== Adjacent stations ==
| « | Service | » |
Toyama Chihō Railway Main Line
Limited Express: Does not stop at this station
| Shitayama | Rapid Express | Tochiya |
| Shitayama | Express | Tochiya |
| Shitayama | Local | Tochiya |

== Surrounding area ==
- Wakaguri Elementary School

== See also ==
- List of railway stations in Japan
