= Ogyū Station =

Railway station in Kurobe, Toyama Prefecture, Japan

Ogyū Station 荻生駅
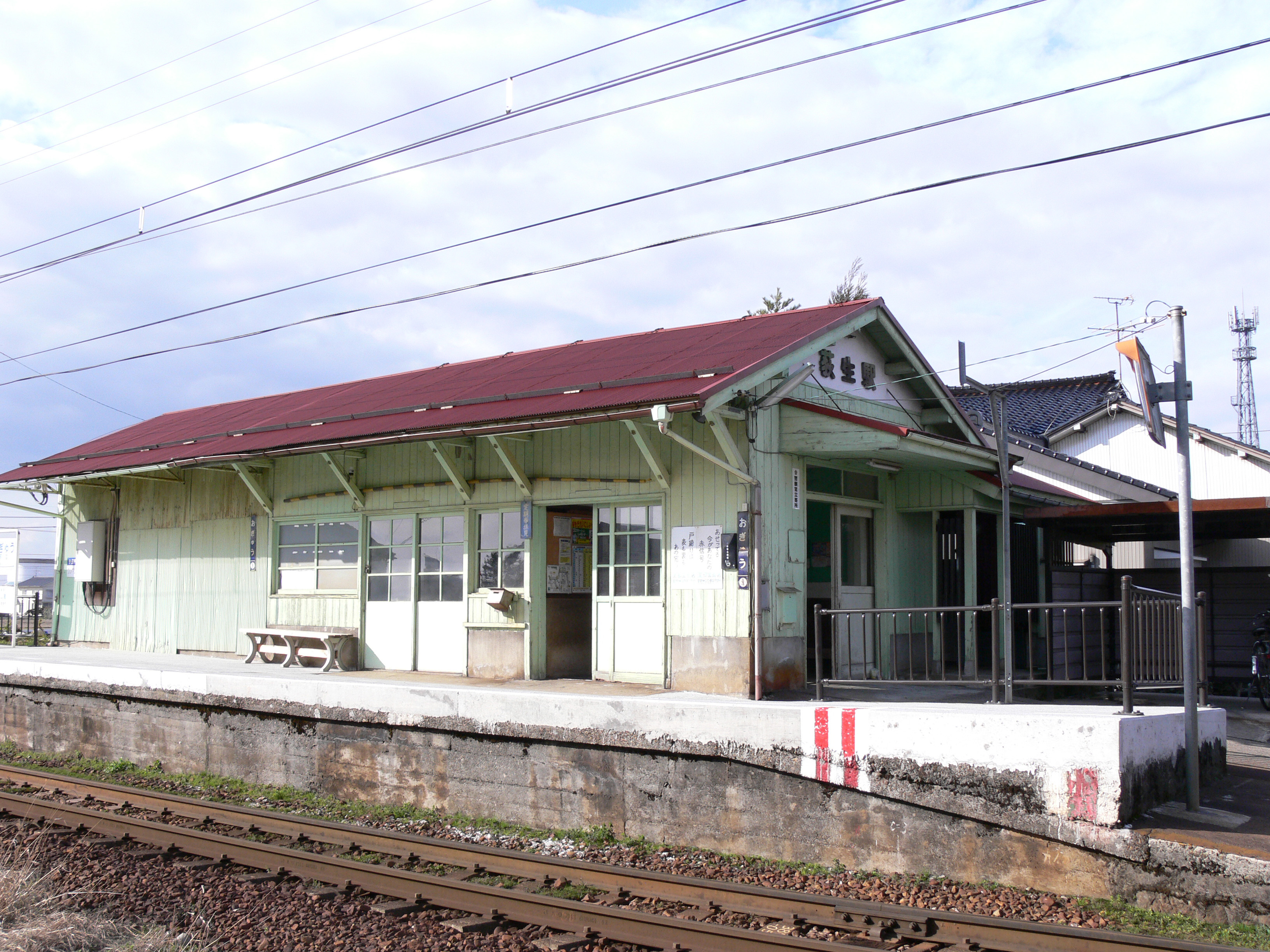
- Ogyū Station in April 2009

General information
- Location: 5276 Ogyū, Kurobe-shi, Toyama-ken 938-0801; Japan
- Coordinates: 36.8751°N 137.4592°E
- Operator: Toyama Chihō Railway
- Line: ■ Toyama Chihō Railway Main Line
- Distance: 38.6 from Dentetsu-Toyama
- Platforms: 1 side platform
- Tracks: 1

Other information
- Status: Unstaffed
- Website: Official website

History
- Opened: 5 November 1922

Passengers
- FY2015: 84
Location
- Location within Japan

Ogyū Station (荻生駅, Ogyū-eki) is a railway station in the city of Kurobe, Toyama, Japan, operated by the private railway operator Toyama Chihō Railway.

== Lines ==
Ogyū Station is served by the Toyama Chihō Railway Main Line, and is 38.6 kilometers from the starting point of the line at Dentetsu-Toyama.

== Station layout ==
The station has one ground-level side platforms serving a single bi-directional track. The station is unattended.

== History ==
Ogyū Station was opened on 5 November 1922.

== Adjacent stations ==
«	Service	»
Toyama Chihō Railway Main Line
Limited Express: Does not stop at this station
Higashi-Mikkaichi	Rapid Express	Nagaya
Higashi-Mikkaichi	Express	Nagaya
Higashi-Mikkaichi	Local	Nagaya

== Passenger statistics ==
In fiscal 2015, the station was used by 84 passengers daily.

== Surrounding area ==
- Sakurai Junior High School

== See also ==
- List of railway stations in Japan
