= Kurobe-Unazukionsen Station =

Railway station in Kurobe, Toyama prefecture, Japan

Kurobe-Unazukionsen Station 黒部宇奈月温泉駅
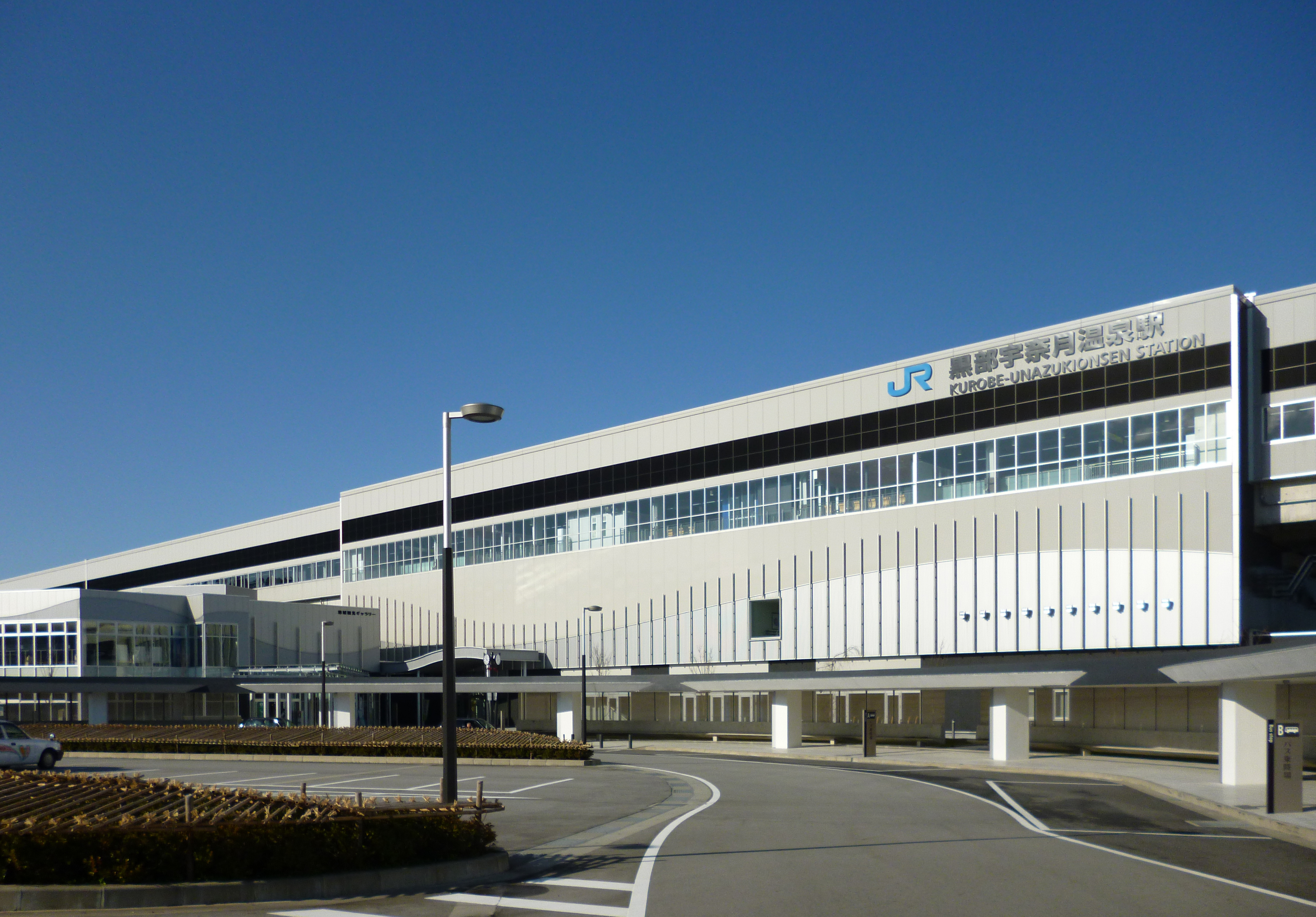
- The east side of Kurobe-Unazukionsen Station in January 2017

Japanese name
- Shinjitai: 黒部宇奈月温泉駅
- Kyūjitai: 黑部宇奈月溫泉驛
- Hiragana: くろべうなづきおんせんえき

General information
- Location: 3210-3 Wakaguri, Kurobe City, Toyama Prefecture; Japan
- Coordinates: 36°52′29″N 137°28′56″E
- Operator: JR West
- Line: Hokuriku Shinkansen
- Distance: 253.1 km (157.3 mi) from Takasaki
- Platforms: 2 side platforms
- Tracks: 2
- Connections: Shin-Kurobe Station

Other information
- Status: Staffed (Installation of Midori no Ticket Vending Machine Plus)
- Website: Official website

History
- Opened: 14 March 2015; 11 years ago

Services
Preceding station	JR West	Following station
Toyama towards Tsuruga	Hokuriku Shinkansen Hakutaka	Itoigawa towards Jōetsumyōkō
Location
- Location within Toyama Prefecture Location within Chubu region Location within Japan

Kurobe-Unazukionsen Station (黒部宇奈月温泉駅, Kurobe-Unazuki-onsen-eki) is a railway station on the high-speed Hokuriku Shinkansen line in Kurobe, Toyama, Japan, operated by West Japan Railway Company (JR West). Shin-Kurobe Station on the Toyama Chihō Railway Main Line is connected to the station by a walkway.

== Lines ==
Kurobe-Unazukionsen Station is served by the high-speed Hokuriku Shinkansen line from Tokyo to Kanazawa, and is located 253.1 km (157.3 mi) from the official starting point of the line at Takasaki. Only semi-fast Hakutaka Tokyo-to-Kanazawa services stop at Kurobe-Unazukionsen, with a roughly hourly service in each direction.

== Station layout ==
The station consists of elevated platforms for the Hokuriku Shinkansen, with exits located on the east, west, and south sides of the station building.

=== Platforms ===
The elevated shinkansen platforms consist of two 312 m long side platforms serving two tracks. The platforms are fitted with chest-high platform edge doors.

1	■ Hokuriku Shinkansen	for Nagano and Tokyo
2	■ Hokuriku Shinkansen	for Toyama, Kanazawa and Tsuruga

The departure melody used for the shinkansen platforms is "Kirameki: Mizu no Miyako kara" (煌～水の都から～), composed by singer-songwriter Kei Takahara, who was born in Toyama Prefecture.

=== Facilities ===
The station has a Midori no ticket vending machine plus". Toilets are located on the ground floor, and waiting rooms and smoking rooms are provided on both of the platforms.

== History ==
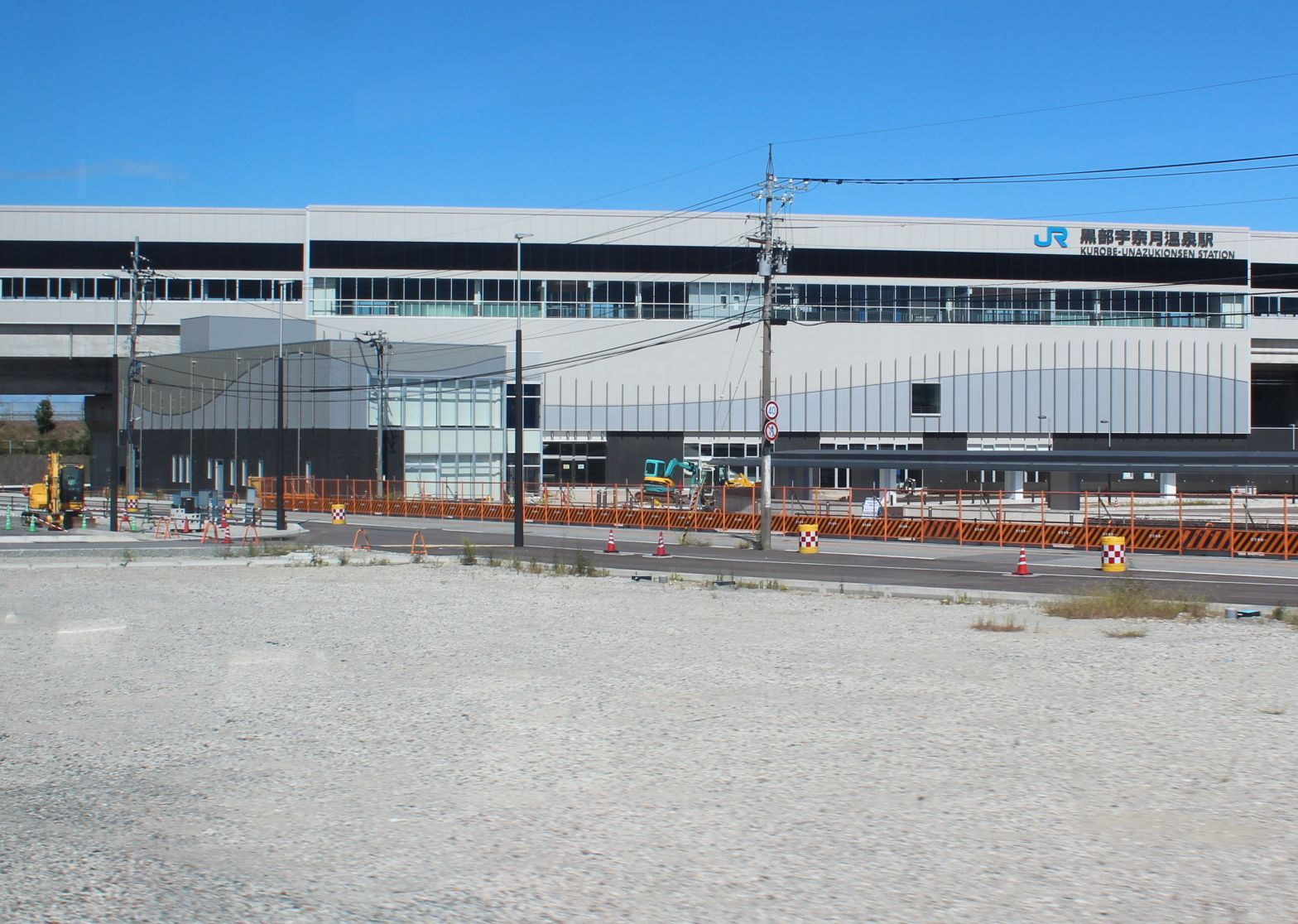
The station under construction in September 2014

Initially given the tentative name of Shin-Kurobe Station (新黒部駅; lit. "New Kurobe Station"), the station name of Kurobe-Unazukionsen was formally made public on 7 June 2013. The name combines the name of the city of Kurobe with Unazuki Onsen, a nearby hot spring resort, and the base to ride The Kurobe Gorge Railway.

Kurobe-Unazukionsen station opened for service on the Hokuriku Shinkansen on 14 March 2015.

== Surrounding area ==
- Shin-Kurobe Station on the Toyama Chihō Railway Main Line
- Hokuriku Expressway Kurobe Interchange
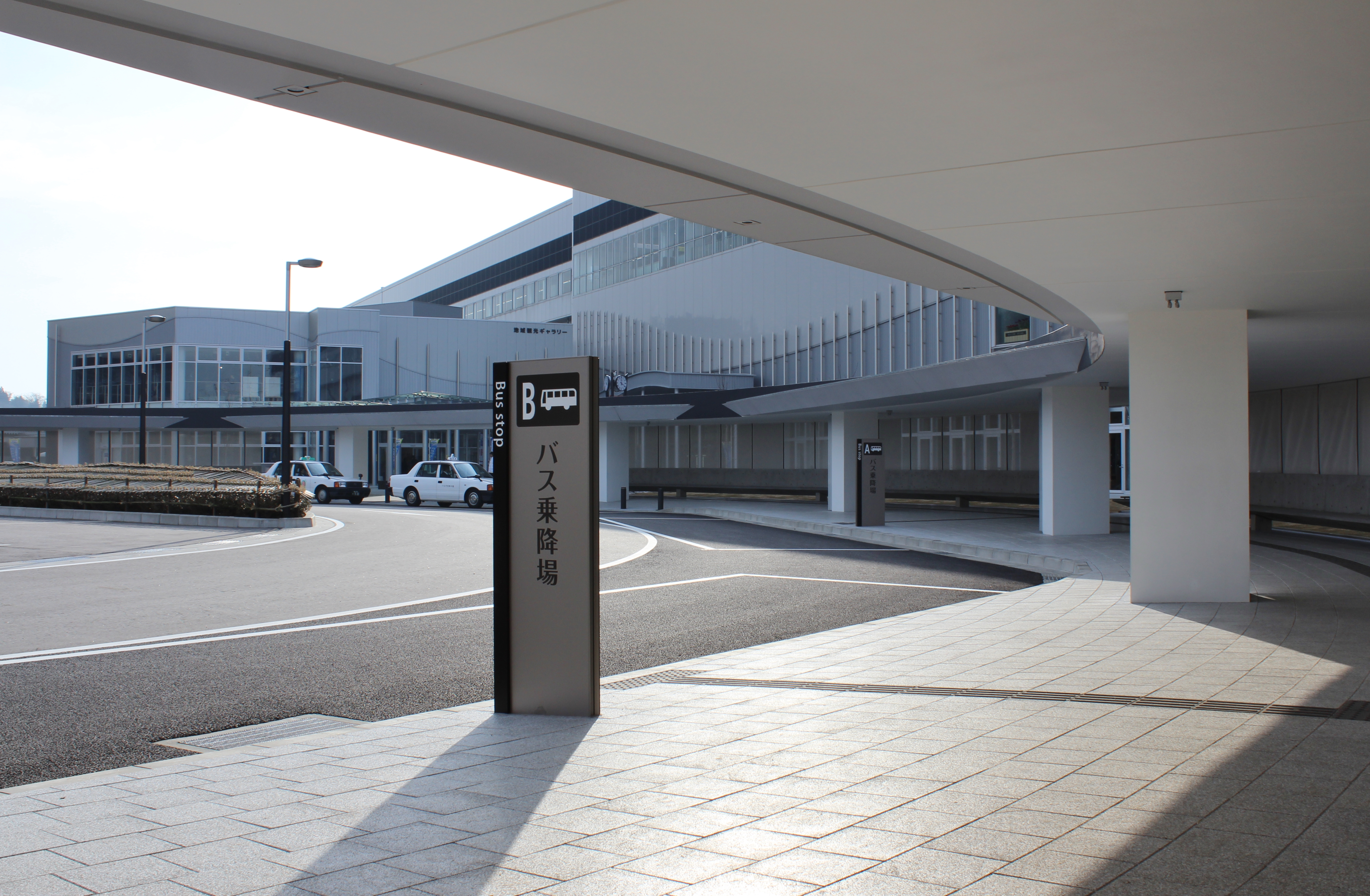
The station forecourt in March 2015

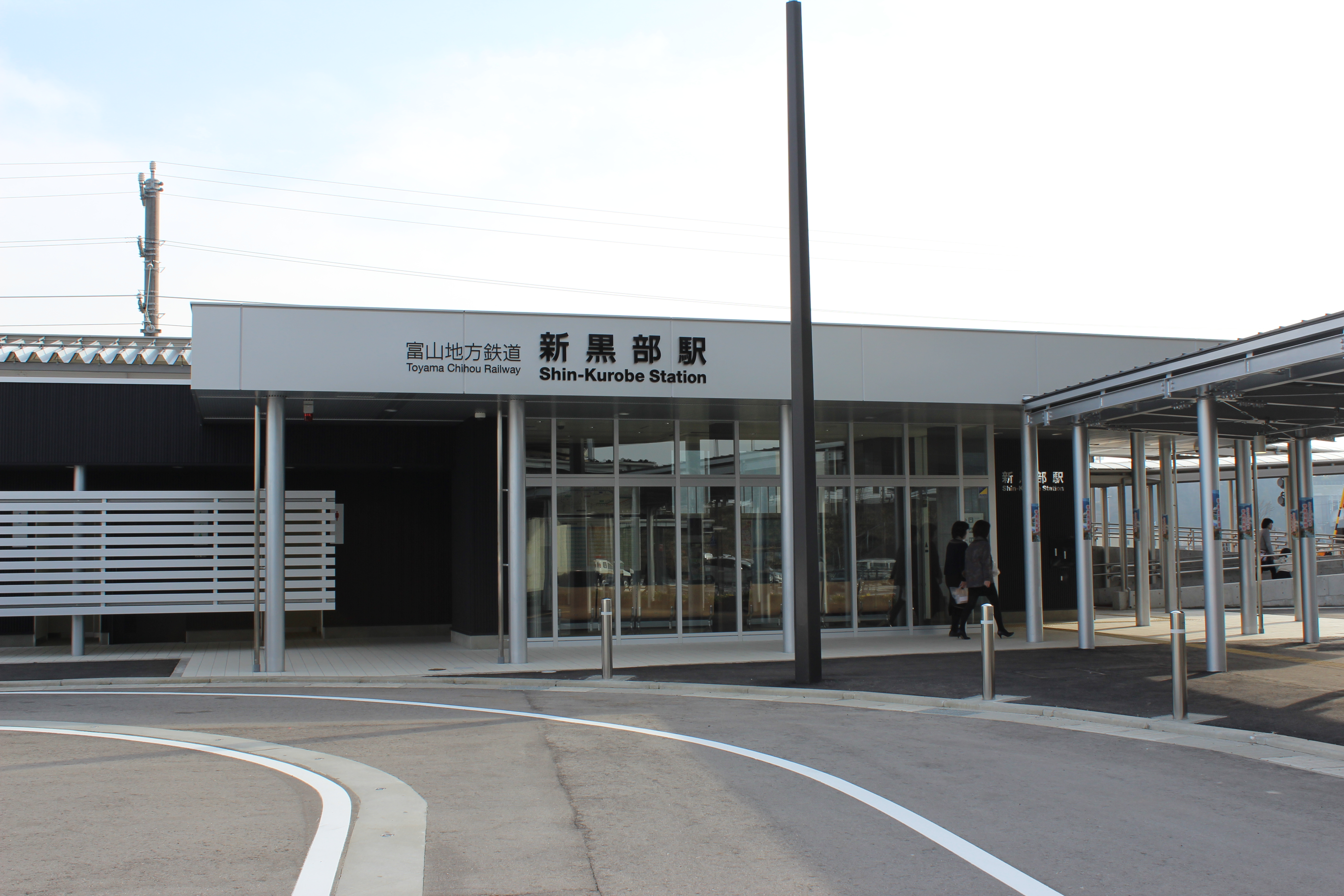
The adjoining Shin-Kurobe Station on the Toyama Chiho Railway in March 2015

== See also ==
- Kurobe Station
- List of railway stations in Japan
