= Shitayama Station =

Railway station in Kurobe, Toyama Prefecture, Japan

Shitayama Station 舌山駅
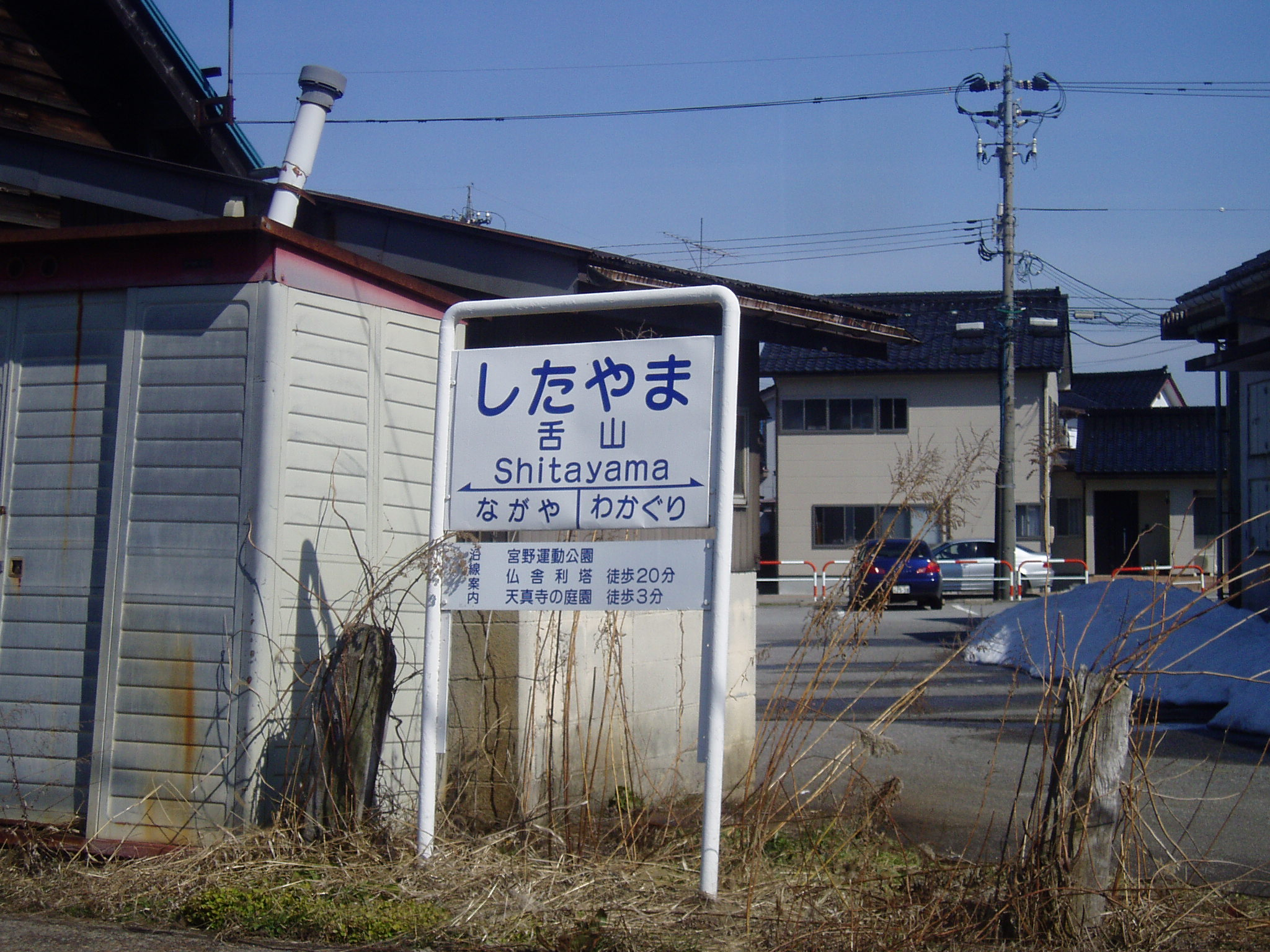
- Shitayama Station

General information
- Location: 4229 Wakaguri, Kurobe-shi, Toyama-ken 938-0802; Japan
- Coordinates: 36.8719°N 137.4861°E
- Operator: Toyama Chihō Railway
- Line: ■ Toyama Chihō Railway Main Line
- Distance: 41.0 from Dentetsu-Toyama
- Platforms: 2 side platforms
- Tracks: 2

Other information
- Status: Unstaffed
- Website: Official website

History
- Opened: 5 November 1922

Passengers
- FY2015: 74
Location
- Location within Japan

Shitayama Station (舌山駅, Shitayama-eki) is a railway station in the city of Kurobe, Toyama, Japan, operated by the private railway operator Toyama Chihō Railway.

== Lines ==
Shitayama Station is served by the Toyama Chihō Railway Main Line, and is 41.0 kilometers from the starting point of the line at Dentetsu-Toyama.

== Station layout ==
The station has two opposed ground-level side platforms connected by a level crossing. The station is unattended.

== History ==
Shitayama Station was opened on 5 November 1922.

== Adjacent stations ==
«	Service	»
Toyama Chihō Railway Main Line
Limited Express: Does not stop at this station
Shin-Kurobe	Rapid Express	Wakaguri
Shin Kurobe	Express	Wakaguri
Shin Kurobe	Local	Wakaguri

== Surrounding area ==
- Hokuriku Expressway

== See also ==
- List of railway stations in Japan
