= Nagaya Station =

Railway station in Kurobe, Toyama Prefecture, Japan

Nagaya Station 長屋駅
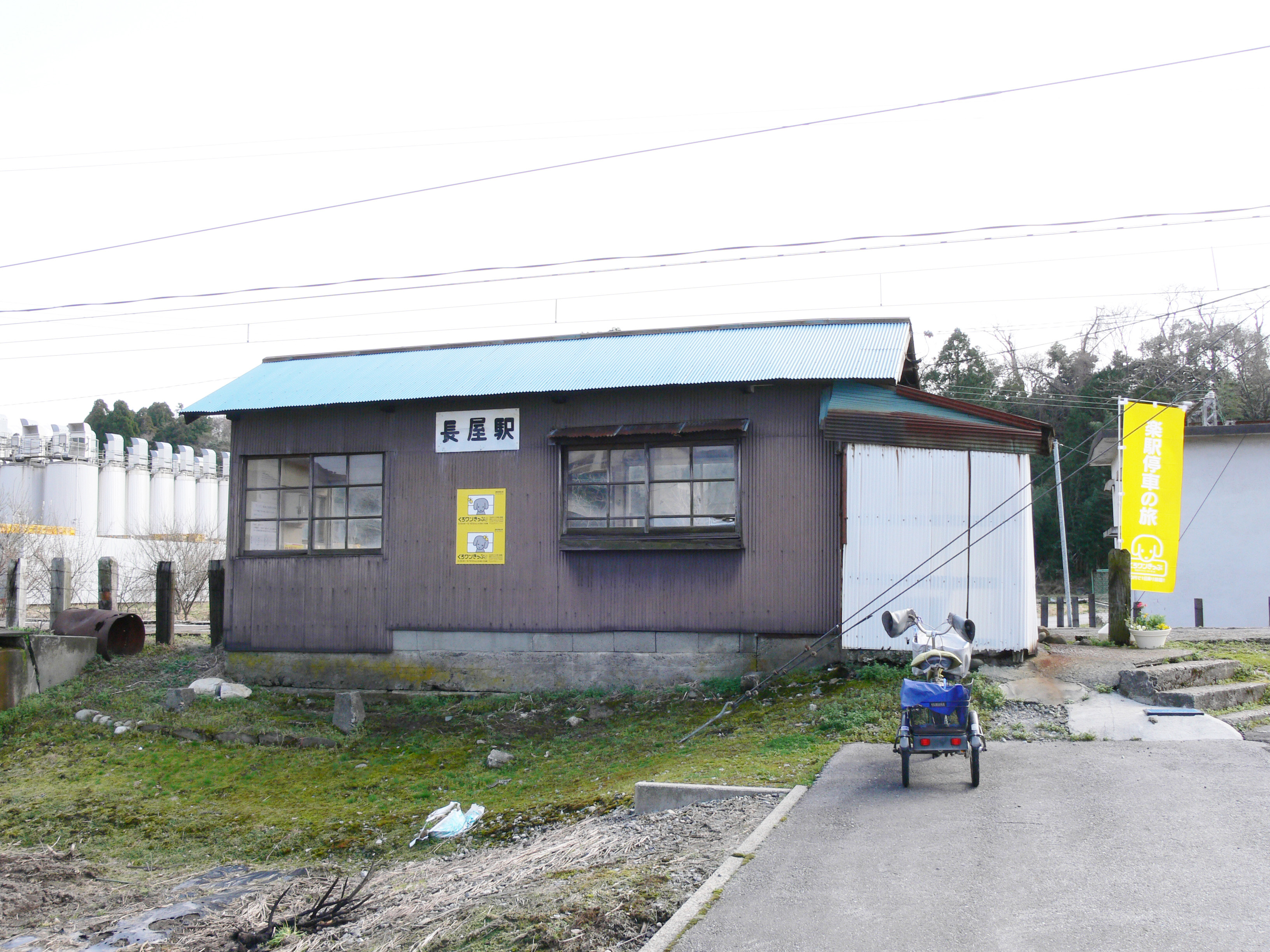
- Nagaya Station in March 2009

General information
- Location: 1382 Nagaya, Kurobe-shi, Toyama-ken 938-0801; Japan
- Coordinates: 36.8736°N 137.4706°E
- Operator: Toyama Chihō Railway
- Line: ■ Toyama Chihō Railway Main Line
- Distance: 39.6 from Dentetsu-Toyama
- Platforms: 1 side platform
- Tracks: 1

Other information
- Status: Unstaffed
- Website: Official website

History
- Opened: 5 November 1922

Passengers
- FY2015: 31
Location
- Location within Japan

Nagaya Station (長屋駅, Nagaya-eki) is a railway station in the city of Kurobe, Toyama, Japan, operated by the private railway operator Toyama Chihō Railway.

== Lines ==
Nagaya Station is served by the Toyama Chihō Railway Main Line, and is 39.6 kilometers from the starting point of the line at Dentetsu-Toyama.

== Station layout ==
The station has one ground-level side platform serving a single bi-directional track. The station is unattended.

== History ==
Nagaya Station was opened on 5 November 1922.

== Adjacent stations ==
| « | Service | » |
Toyama Chihō Railway Main Line
Limited Express: Does not stop at this station
| Ogyū | Rapid Express | Shin-Kurobe |
| Ogyū | Express | Shin Kurobe |
| Ogyū | Local | Shin Kurobe |

== Surrounding area ==
- Hokuriku Expressway

== See also ==
- List of railway stations in Japan
