= Kurobe =

Kurobe 黒部市
- City
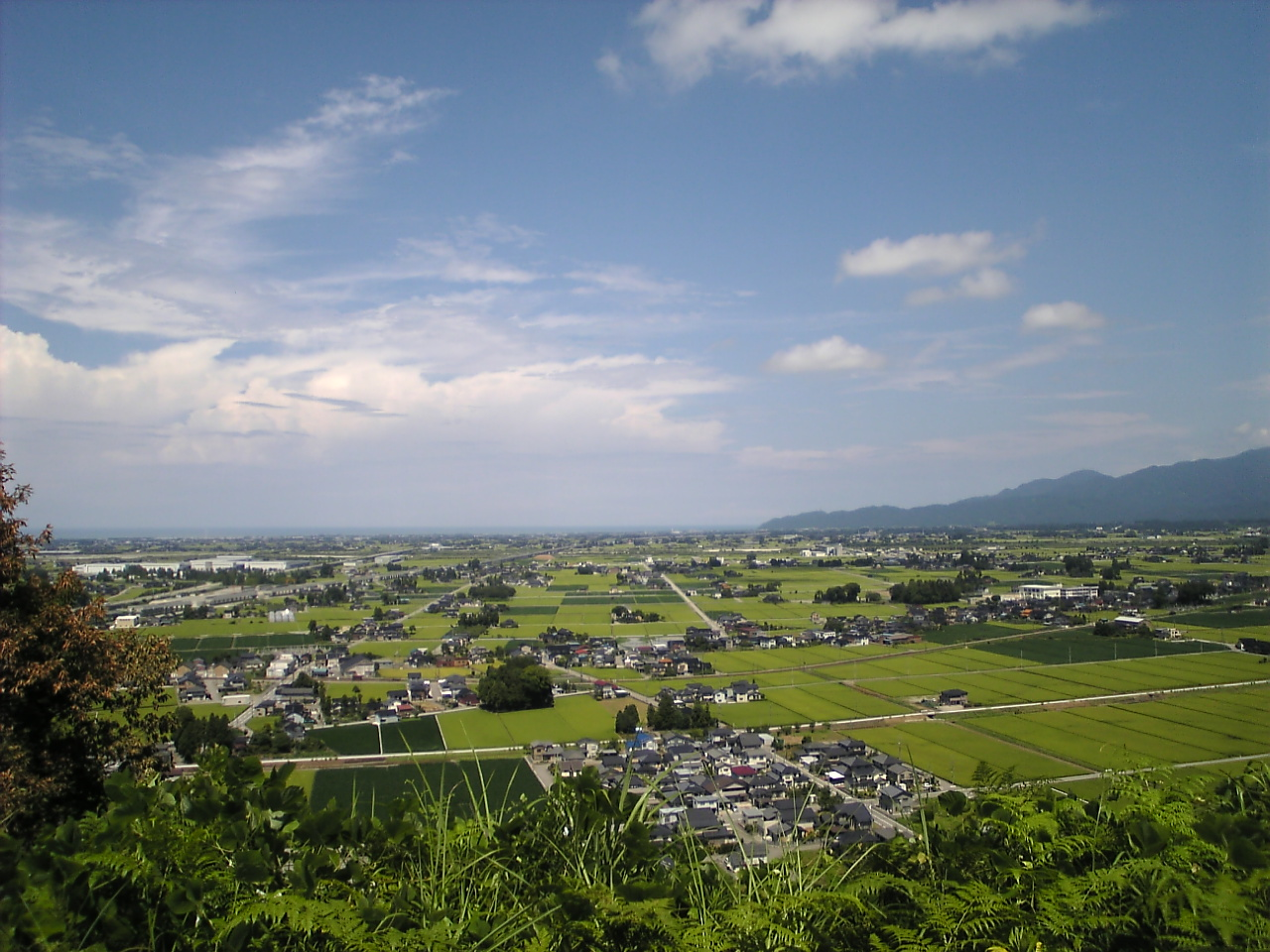
- Kurobe city skyline

- Flag Seal

- Location of Kurobe in Toyama Prefecture

- Coordinates: 36°52′N 137°27′E
- Country: Japan
- Region: Chūbu (Kōshin'etsu)
- Prefecture: Toyama
- City sttled ->: April 1, 1954

Government
  - - Mayor: Nobuhiro Kamisaka (上坂展弘) - from April 2026

Area
  - Total: 426.31 km^{2} (164.60 sq mi)

Population (February 2018)
  - Total: 41,564
  - Density: 95.8/km^{2} (248/sq mi)
- Time zone: UTC+9 (Japan Standard Time)
- Symbols
  - Tree: Tsuga sieboldii, Juglans
  - Flower: Cherry blossom, Camellia
- Phone number: 0765-54-2111
- Address: 725 Mikkaichi, Kurobe-shi, Toyama-ken 938-8555
- Website: kurobe.city.kurobe.toyama.jp

Kurobe (黒部市, Kurobe-shi) is a city in Toyama Prefecture, in the Chūbu region of Japan. As of 1 February 2018, the city had an estimated population of 41,564 in 15,387 households and a population density of 95.8 persons per km^{2}. Its total area was 426.31 square kilometres (164.60 sq mi).

== Geography ==
Kurobe is located in northeastern of Toyama Prefecture, with a topography ranging from sea level at Toyama Bay to the 3000 meter mountains of the Northern Alps on the border with Nagano Prefecture. The Kurobe River flows through the city. Kurobe has a humid subtropical climate (Köppen Cfa) characterized by mild summers and cold winters with heavy snowfall. The average annual temperature in Kurobe is 13.7 °C. The average annual rainfall is 2277 mm with September as the wettest month. The temperatures are highest on average in August, at around 26.2 °C, and lowest in January, at around 2.6 °C.

=== Surrounding municipalities ===
- Nagano Prefecture
  - Hakuba
  - Ōmachi
- Toyama Prefecture
  - Asahi
  - Kamiichi
  - Nyūzen
  - Tateyama
  - Uozu

== Demographics ==
Per Japanese census data, the population of Kurobe has remained relatively steady over the past 50 years.

Historical population
Year	Pop.	±%
1970	41,847	—
1980	43,096	+3.0%
1990	43,754	+1.5%
2000	43,084	−1.5%
2010	41,852	−2.9%
2020	39,638	−5.3%

== History ==
The area is home to the Aimotohimesha Shrine and also shares its name with Kurobe River, both of which form a central element in the local legend of a powerful serpent of Kurobe River.

The area of present-day Kurobe was part of ancient Etchū Province. The towns of Ikuji and Mikkaichi were created on April 1, 1889 with the establishment of the municipalities system. On April 1, 1954, the town of Ikuji merged with the town of Sakurai to form the city of Kurobe.

On March 31, 2006 the town of Unazuki (from Shimoniikawa District) was merged into Kurobe.

== Government ==
Kurobe has a mayor-council form of government with a directly elected mayor and a unicameral city legislature of 18 members.

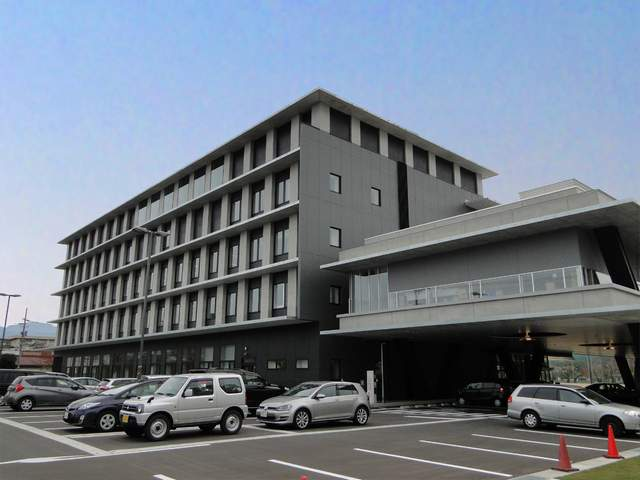
Kurobe city hall

== Economy ==
Kurobe is the world headquarters of YKK.

== Education ==
Kurobe has nine public elementary schools and four public junior high schools. The city has one public high school operated by the Toyama Prefectural Board of Education. The prefecture also operates one special education school.

== Transportation ==
=== Railway ===
- West Japan Railway Company (JR West) – Hokuriku Shinkansen
  - Kurobe-Unazukionsen
- Ainokaze Toyama Railway
  - Kurobe - Ikuji
- Toyama Chihō Railway
  - Dentetsu-Ishida - Dentetsu Kurobe - Higashi-Mikkaichi - Ogyū - Nagaya - Shin-Kurobe - Shitayama - Wakaguri - Tochiya - Urayama - Oritateguchi - Oritate - Aimoto - Uchiyama - Otozawa - Unazuki Onsen
- Kurobe Gorge Railway

=== Highway ===
- National Route 8

== International relations ==
- Sneek, Friesland, Netherlands, since September 10, 1970
- Macon-Bibb, Georgia, United States, since May 10, 1977
- Samcheok, Korea, friendship city

== Local attractions ==
- Kurobe Gorge
- Unazuki Onsen

== Notable people from Kurobe ==
- Susumu Kurobe, actor
- Mitsuhiro Miyakoshi, politician
