= Higashi-Mikkaichi Station =

Railway station in Kurobe, Toyama Prefecture, Japan

Higashi-Mikkaichi Station 東三日市駅
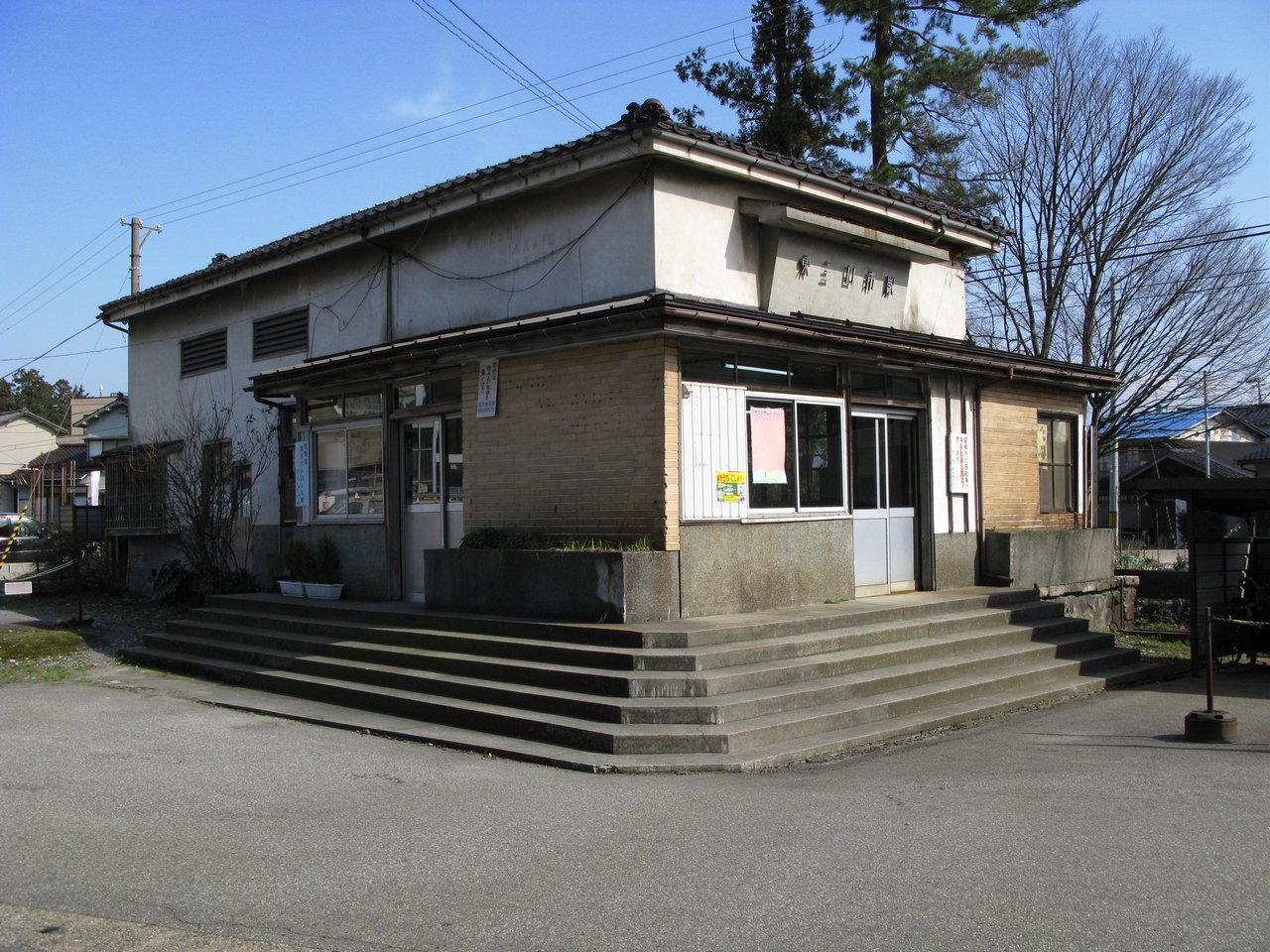
- Higashi-Mikkaichi Station in March 2008

General information
- Location: 2894-3 Sakai-Mikkaichi, Kurobe-shi, Toyama-ken 938-0031; Japan
- Coordinates: 36.8747°N 137.4507°E
- Operator: Toyama Chihō Railway
- Line: ■ Toyama Chihō Railway Main Line
- Distance: 37.8 from Dentetsu-Toyama
- Platforms: 1 side platform
- Tracks: 1

Other information
- Status: Staffed
- Website: Official website

History
- Opened: 5 November 1922

Passengers
- FY2015: 414
Location
- Location within Japan

Higashi-Mikkaichi Station (東三日市駅, Higashi-Mikkaichi-eki) is a railway station in the city of Kurobe, Toyama, Japan, operated by the private railway operator Toyama Chihō Railway.

== Lines ==
Higashi-Mikkaichi Station is served by the Toyama Chihō Railway Main Line, and is 37.8 kilometers from the starting point of the line at Dentetsu-Toyama.

== Station layout ==
The station has one side platform serving a single bi-directional track. The station is attended.

== History ==
Higashi-Mikkaichi Station was opened on 5 November 1922.

== Adjacent stations ==
«	Service	»
Toyama Chihō Railway Main Line
Dentetsu-Kurobe	Limited Express	Shin-Kurobe
Dentetsu-Kurobe	Rapid Express	Ogyū
Dentetsu-Kurobe	Express	Ogyū
Dentetsu-Kurobe	Local	Ogyū

== Passenger statistics ==
In fiscal 2015, the station was used by 414 passengers daily.

== Surrounding area ==
- Kurobe City Hall
- Sakurai High School

== See also ==
- List of railway stations in Japan
