= Shin-Kurobe Station =

Railway station in Kurobe, Toyama Prefecture, Japan

Shin-Kurobe Station 新黒部駅
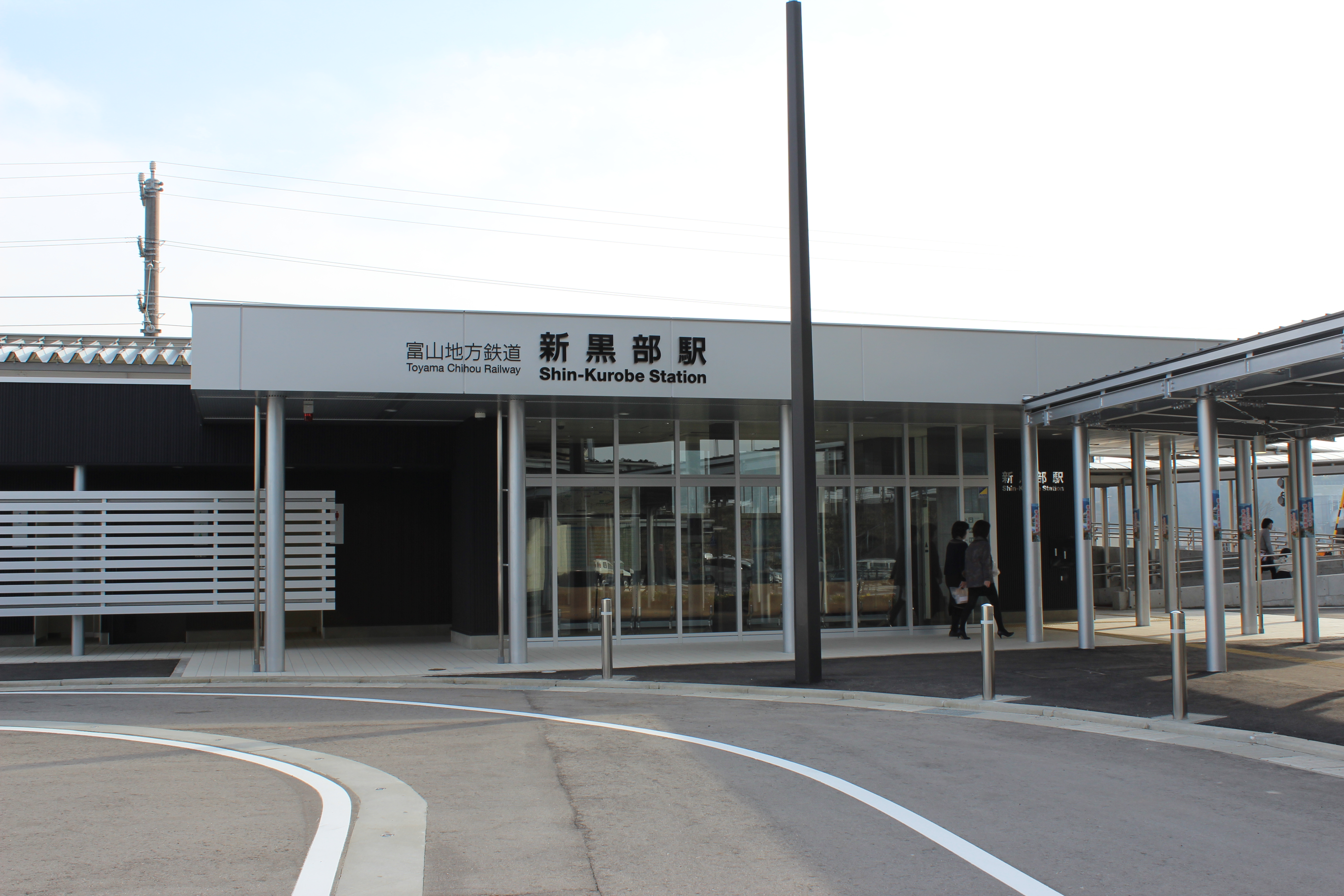
- The station exterior in March 2015

General information
- Location: 2787 Wakaguri, Kurobe-shi, Toyama-ken 938-0802; Japan
- Coordinates: 36°52′23.3″N 137°28′51.5″E
- Operator: Toyama Chihō Railway
- Line: ■ Toyama Chihō Railway Main Line
- Distance: 40.7 km from Dentetsu-Toyama
- Platforms: 1 side platform
- Tracks: 1
- Connections: Kurobe-Unazukionsen Station

Other information
- Status: Staffed
- Website: Official website

History
- Opened: February 26, 2015
Location
- Location within Japan

Shin-Kurobe Station (新黒部駅, Shin-Kurobe-eki) is a railway station on the Toyama Chihō Railway Main Line in the city of Kurobe, Toyama, Japan, operated by the private railway operator Toyama Chihō Railway.

== Services ==
Shin-Kurobe Station is served by the Toyama Chihō Railway Main Line, and is 40.7 kilometers from the starting point of the line at Dentetsu-Toyama.

Under the timetable effective from the opening of the station in February 2015, 66 trains on the Toyama Chihō Railway Main Line including limited express services stop at the station to serve an estimated 870 passengers per day. All shinkansen services at Kurobe-Unazukionsen Station connect with trains at Shin-Kurobe Station.

== Layout ==
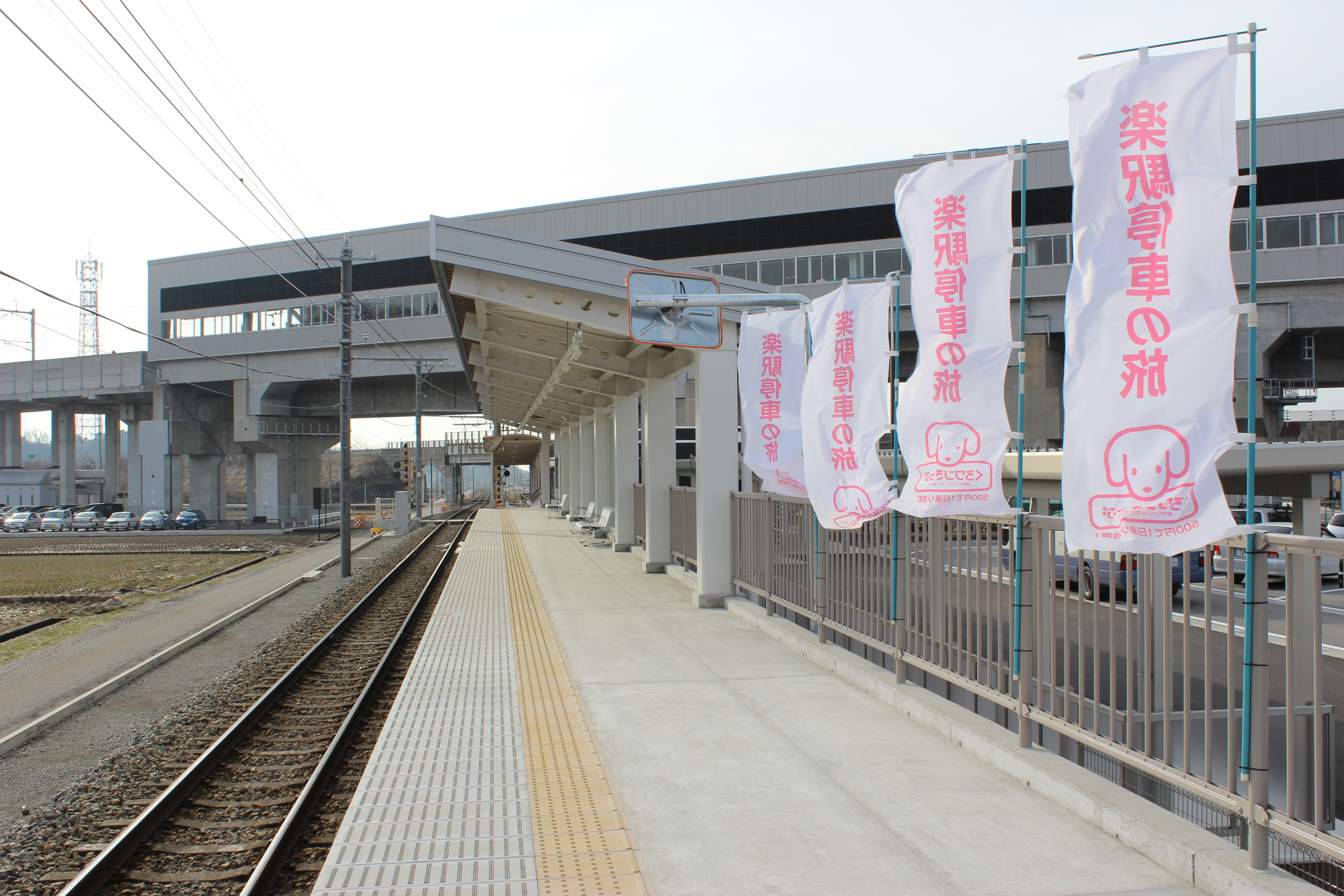
The platform in March 2015

The station has a wheelchair-accessible 85-meter-long (279 ft) side platform serving a single bi-directional track.

== Adjacent stations ==
| « | Service | » |
Toyama Chihō Railway Main Line
| Higashi-Mikkaichi | Limited Express | Urayama |
| Nagaya | Rapid Express | Shitayama |
| Nagaya | Express | Shitayama |
| Nagaya | Local | Shitayama |

== History ==
Construction of the station began on November 7, 2013.

The station opened on February 26, 2015, ahead of the opening of adjacent Kurobe-Unazukionsen Station on the Hokuriku Shinkansen.

== Surrounding area ==
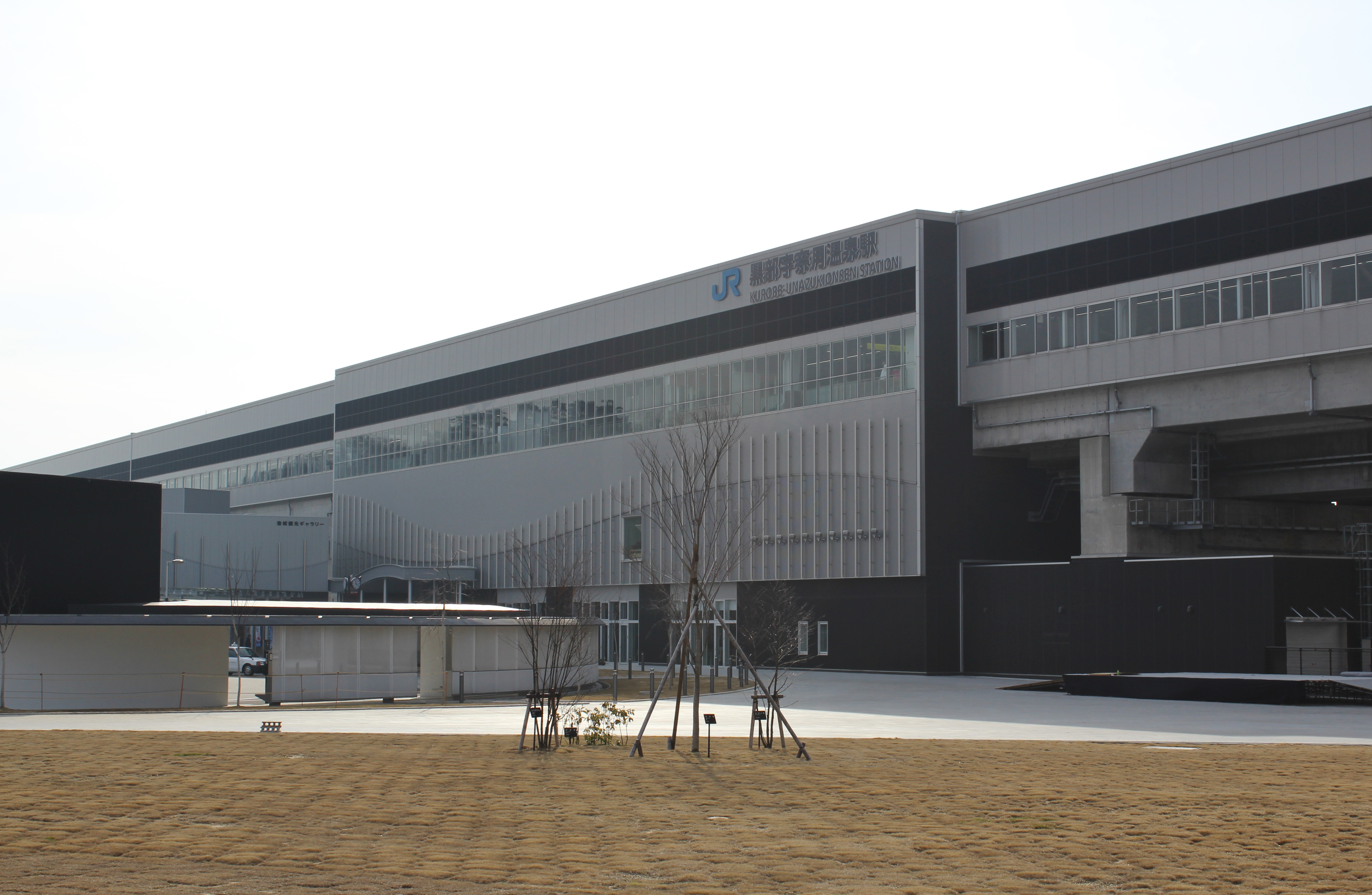
The adjacent Kurobe-Unazukionsen Station on the Hokuriku Shinkansen, March 2015

- Kurobe-Unazukionsen Station (on the Hokuriku Shinkansen)

== See also ==
- List of railway stations in Japan
