= Toyama Prefecture =

Prefecture of Japan

Toyama Prefecture 富山県
- Prefecture

Japanese transcription(s)
  - Japanese: 富山県
  - Rōmaji: Toyama-ken
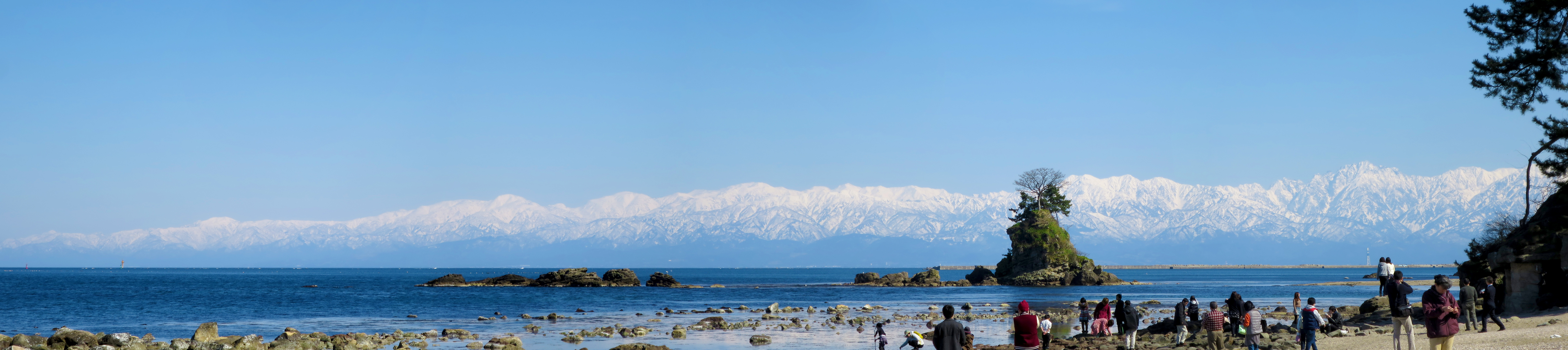
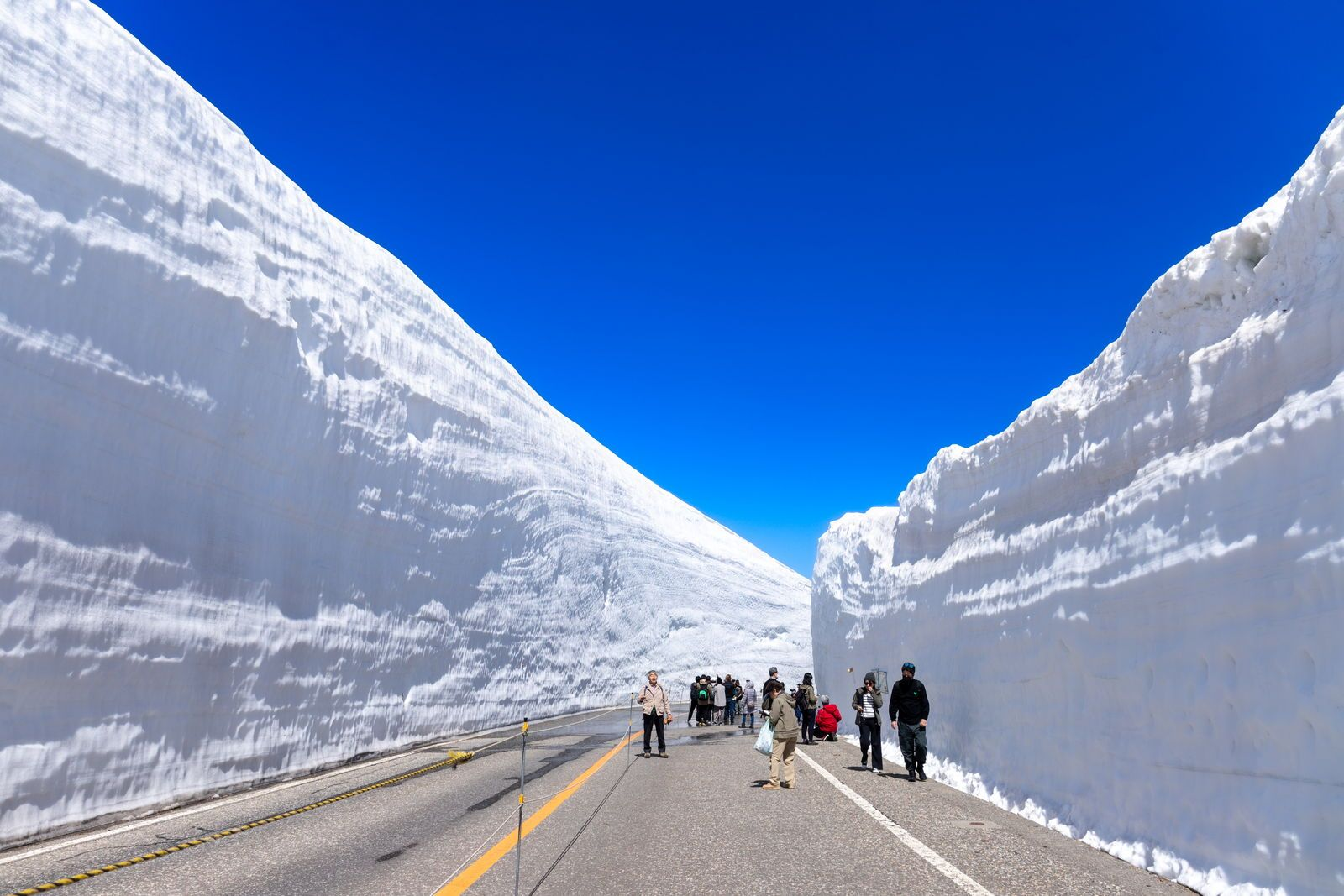
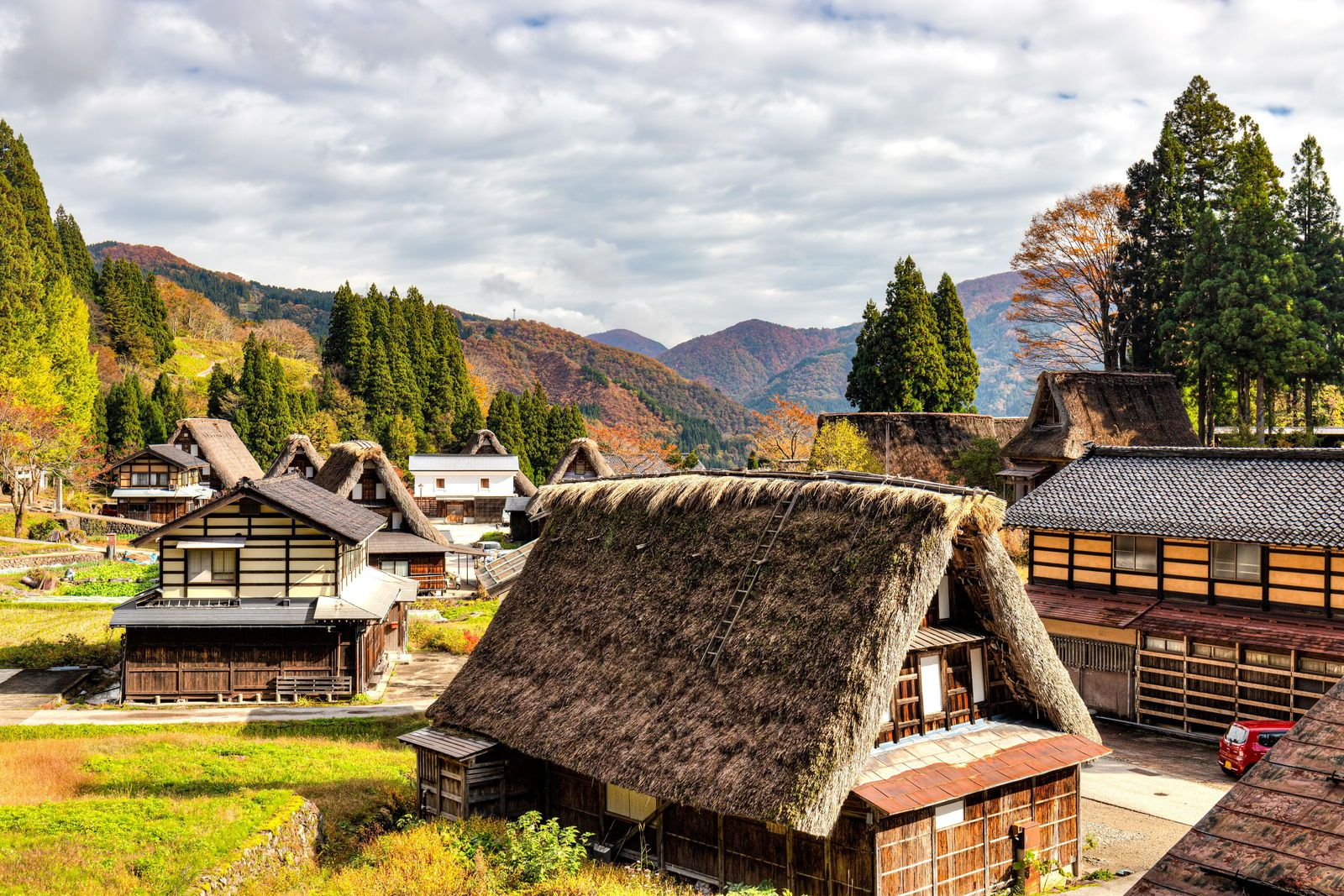
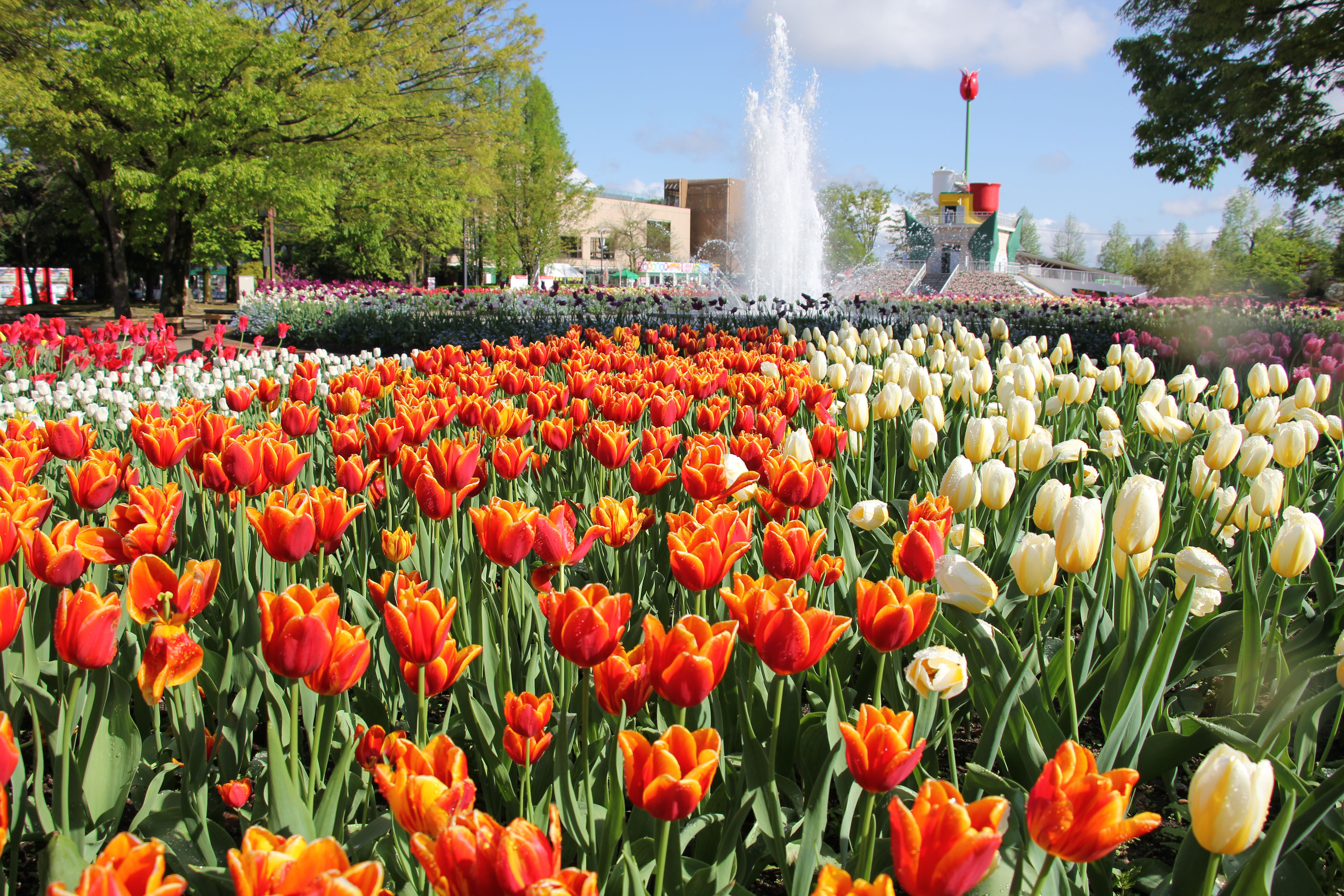
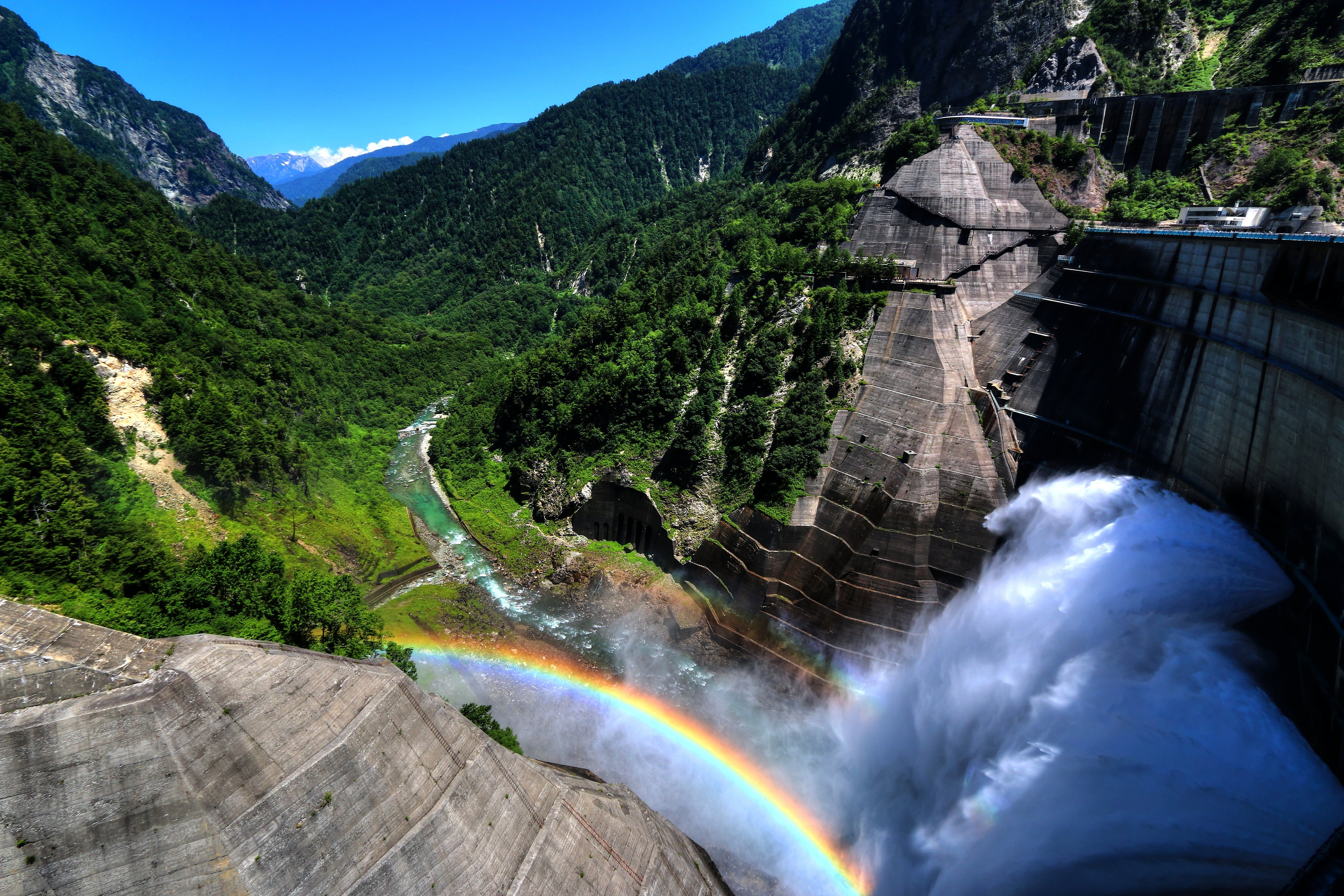
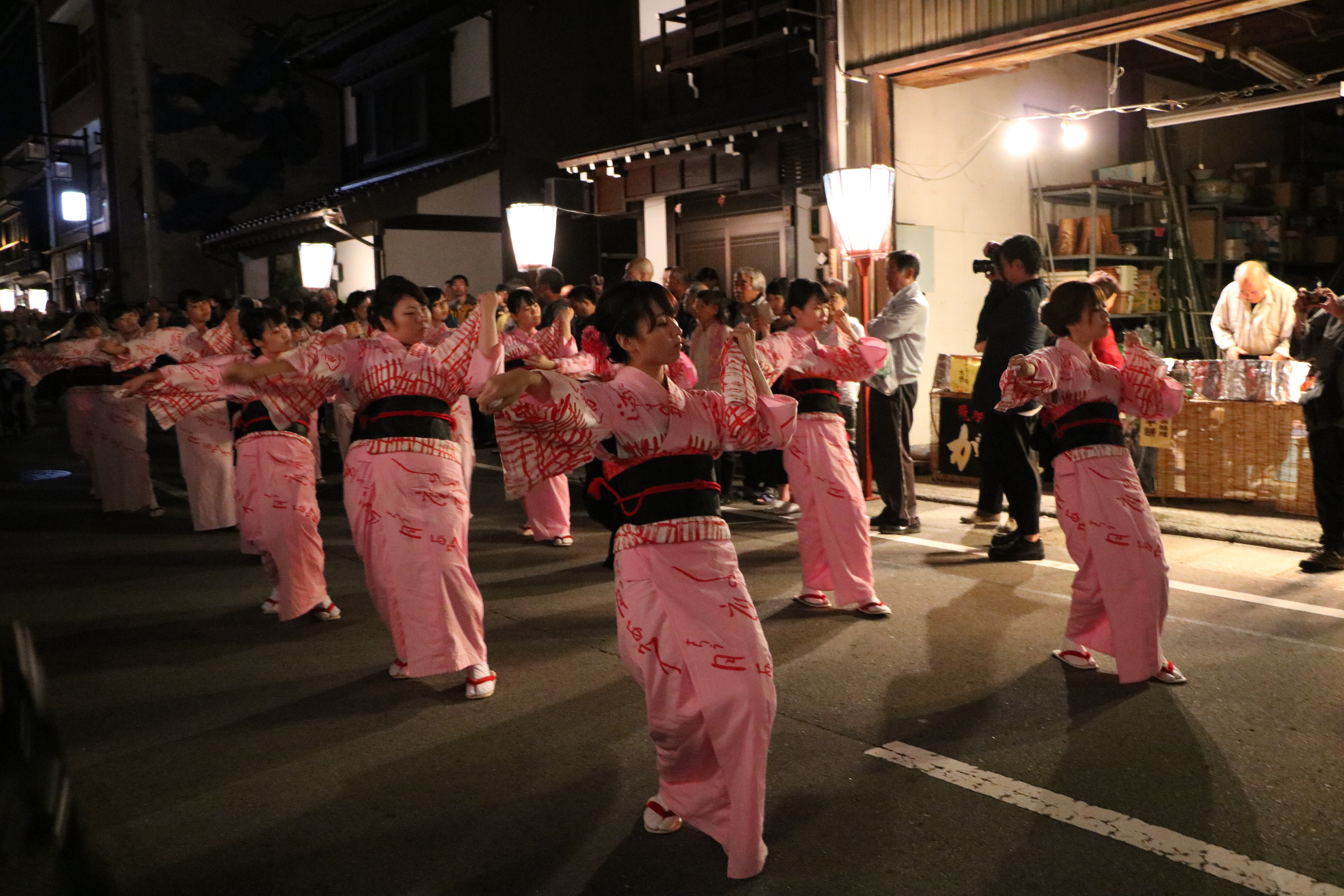
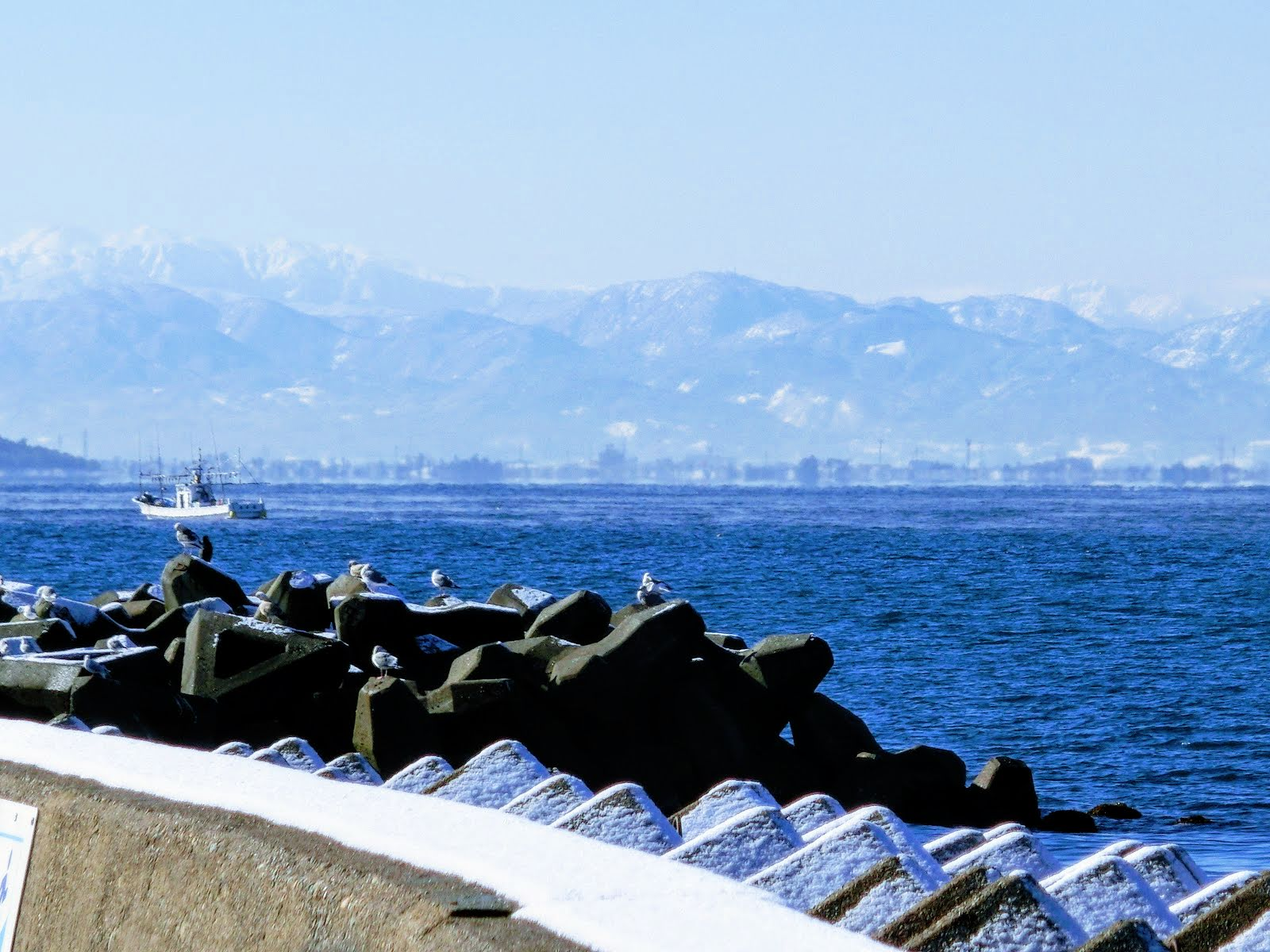
- Tateyama Mountain Range and Toyama Bay Snow wall in Tateyama Kurobe Alpine Route Gokayama Tonami Tulip Fair Kurobe Dam Bon Dance of Owara's Wind Winter mirage in Toyama Bay and Tateyama Mountain Range

- Flag Emblem
- Anthem: Toyama kenmin no uta
- Coordinates: 36°43′N 137°9′E
- Country: Japan
- Region: Chūbu (Hokuriku)
- Island: Honshu
- Capital: Toyama
- Subdivisions: Districts: 2, Municipalities: 15

Government
  - Governor: Hachiro Nitta

Area
  - Total: 4,247.61 km^{2} (1,640.01 sq mi)
  - Rank: 33rd

Population (June 1, 2019)
  - Total: 1,044,588
  - Rank: 37th
  - Density: 245.924/km^{2} (636.939/sq mi)

GDP
  - Total: JP¥ 4,927 billion US$ 36.4 billion (2022)
- ISO 3166 code: JP-16
- Website: pref.toyama.jp
- Symbols of Japan
- Bird: Ptarmigan
- Fish: Japanese amberjack Pasiphaea japonica Firefly squid
- Flower: Tulip (Tulipa)
- Tree: Tateyama Cedar (Cryptomeria japonica)

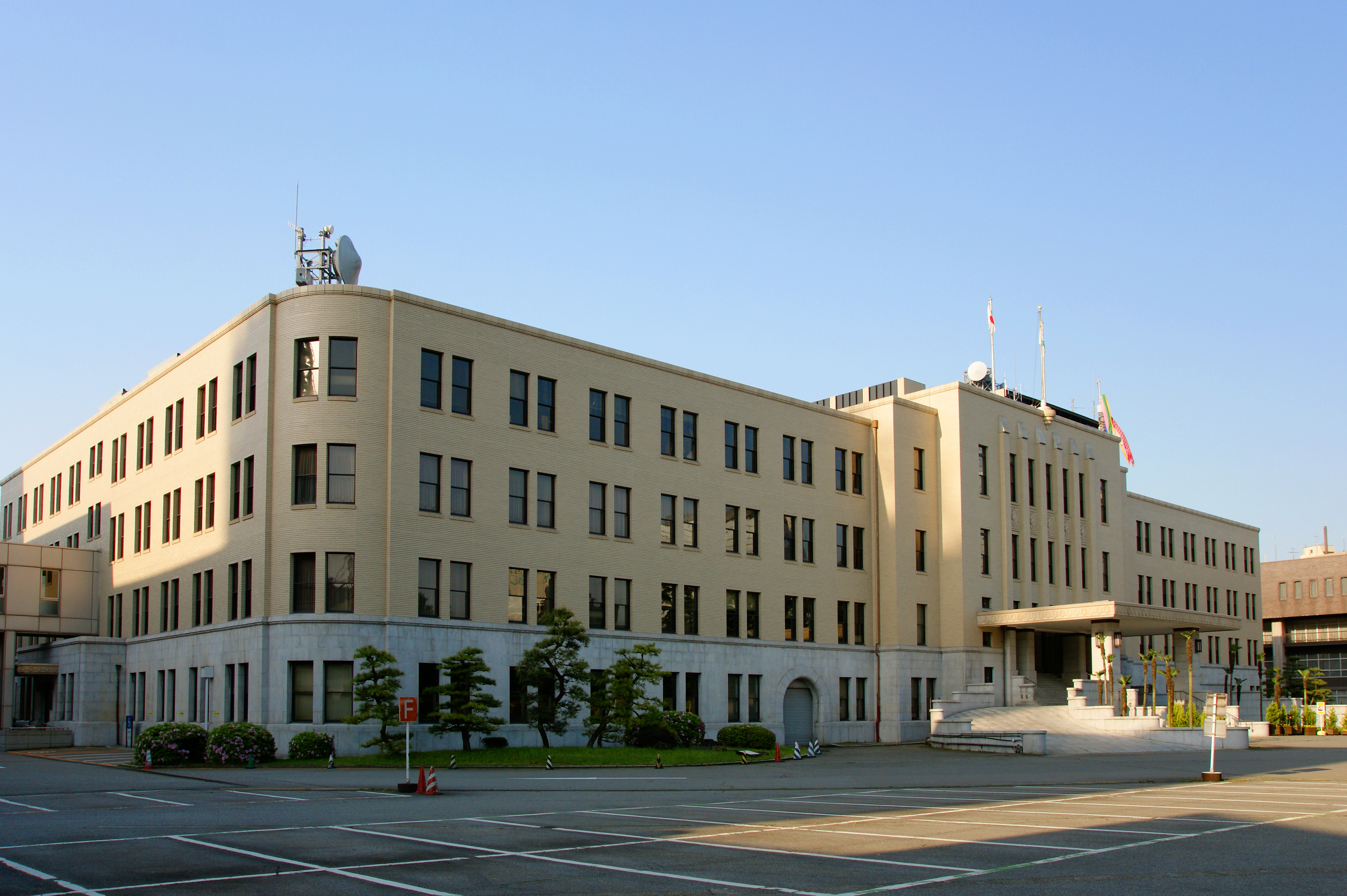
Toyama Prefectural Office Building

Toyama Prefecture (富山県, Toyama-ken; Japanese pronunciation: [tó̞.jä̀.mä̀, tò̞.jä́.mä́.kè̞ɴ̀]) is a prefecture of Japan located in the Chūbu region of Honshu. Toyama Prefecture has a population of 993,848 (1 January 2025) and has a geographic area of 4,247.61 km^{2} (1,640.01 sq mi). Toyama Prefecture borders Ishikawa Prefecture to the west, Gifu Prefecture to the south, Nagano Prefecture to the east, and Niigata Prefecture to the northeast.

Toyama is the capital and largest city of Toyama Prefecture, with other major cities including Takaoka, Imizu, and Nanto. Toyama Prefecture is part of the historic Hokuriku region, and the majority of the prefecture's population lives on Toyama Bay, one of the largest bays in Japan. Toyama Prefecture is the leading industrial prefecture on the Japan Sea coast and has the advantage of cheap electricity from abundant hydroelectric resources. Toyama Prefecture contains the only known glaciers in East Asia outside of Russia, first recognized in 2012, and 30% of the prefecture's area is designated as national parks.

== History ==
Historically, Toyama Prefecture was Etchū Province. Following the abolition of the han system in 1871, Etchū Province was renamed Niikawa Prefecture, but Imizu District was given to Nanao Prefecture. In 1872 Imizu District was returned by the new Ishikawa Prefecture.

In 1876, Niikawa Prefecture was merged into Ishikawa Prefecture but the merger was void in 1881 and the area was re-established as Toyama Prefecture.

The Itai-itai disease occurred in Toyama around 1950.

== Geography ==
Toyama Prefecture is bordered by Ishikawa Prefecture to the west, Niigata to the northeast, Nagano to the southeast, Gifu to the south and Sea of Japan to the north.

As of April 1, 2012, 30% of the total land area of the prefecture was designated as Natural Parks, namely the Chūbu-Sangaku and Hakusan National Parks; Noto Hantō Quasi-National Park; and six Prefectural Natural Parks.

== Municipalities ==
Due to the mergers in the 2000s, Toyama has the fewest municipalities of any prefecture in Japan with 10 cities, 2 districts, 4 towns, and 1 village (before the mergers took place, the prefecture had 9 cities, 18 towns, and 8 villages).

=== Cities ===
Ten cities are located in Toyama Prefecture.

Name		Area (km^{2})	Population	Map
Rōmaji	Kanji	Area (km^{2})	Population	Map
Himi	氷見市	230.56	43,995	
Imizu	射水市	109.43	90,807	
Kurobe	黒部市	426.31	41,564	
Namerikawa	滑川市	54.63	32,728	
Nanto	南砺市	668.64	47,976	
Oyabe	小矢部市	134.07	30,328	
Takaoka	高岡市	209.57	173,086	
Tonami	砺波市	127.03	48,659	
Toyama (capital)	富山市	1,241.77	415,844	
Uozu	魚津市	200.61	42,224	

=== Towns and villages ===
These are the towns and villages in each district:

Name		Area (km^{2})	Population	District	Map
Rōmaji	Kanji	Area (km^{2})	Population	District	Map
Asahi	朝日町	226.30	11,093	Shimoniikawa District	
Funahashi	舟橋村	3.47	3,304	Nakaniikawa District	
Kamiichi	上市町	236.71	20,827	Nakaniikawa District	
Nyūzen	入善町	71.25	23,875	Shimoniikawa District	
Tateyama	立山町	307.29	24,862	Nakaniikawa District	

Municipalities in Toyama Prefecture City Town Village

== List of governors of Toyama Prefecture (1947–present) ==
- Tetsuji Tachi (館 哲二) (19 April 1947 to 15 November 1947)
- Takekuni Takatsuji (高辻 武邦) (16 November 1947 to 30 September 1956)
- Minoru Yoshida (吉田 実) (1 October 1956 to 1 December 1969)
- Kōkichi Nakata (中田 幸吉) (30 December 1969 to 18 September 1980)
- Yutaka Nakaoki (中沖 豊) (11 November 1980 to 8 November 2004)
- Takakazu Ishii (石井 隆一) (9 November 2004 to 8 November 2020)
- Hachirō Nitta (新田 八朗) (9 November 2020 to present)

== Economy ==
=== Agriculture ===
In 2014 Toyama contributed approximately 2.5% of Japan's rice production and makes use of abundant water sources originating from Mount Tate. It also has many fisheries along its Sea of Japan coastline.

=== Manufacturing ===
Toyama is famous for its historical pharmaceutical industry which remains a top manufacturing industry in the prefecture in terms of manufacturing shipment value followed by electronic parts and devices (industrial robots, general machinery, etc.), and metal products (aluminum, copper etc.) manufacturing.

=== Energy ===
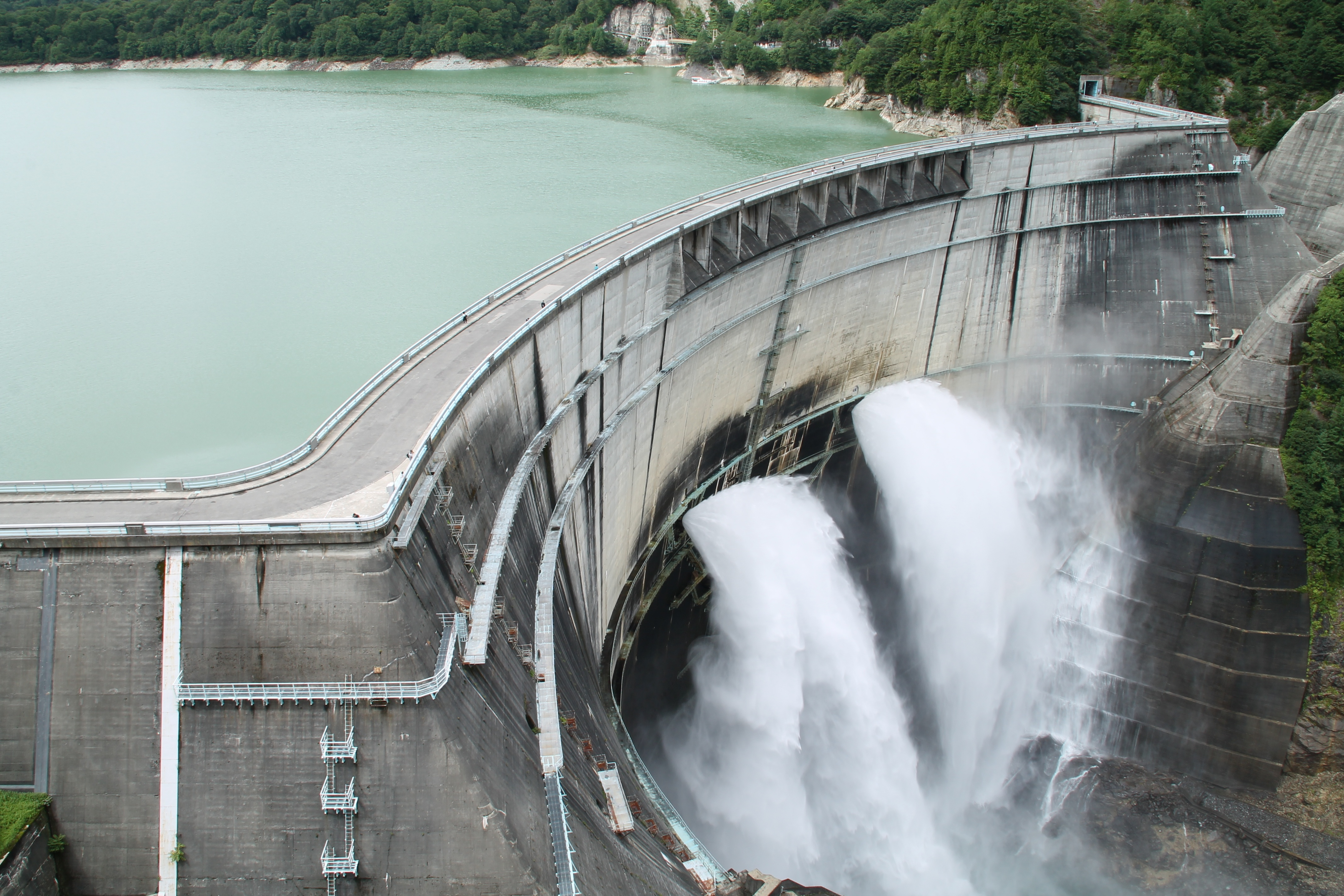
Kurobe Dam

Kurobe Dam generates electricity for the Kansai Electric Power Company. It is located on the Kurobe River in Toyama Prefecture.

== Demographics ==
Toyama prefecture population pyramid in 2020

Per Japanese census data, the population of Toyama has been relatively stable since 1950.

Historical population
Year	Pop.	±%
1920	724,276	—
1930	778,953	+7.5%
1940	822,569	+5.6%
1950	1,008,790	+22.6%
1960	1,032,614	+2.4%
1970	1,029,695	−0.3%
1980	1,103,459	+7.2%
1990	1,120,161	+1.5%
2000	1,120,851	+0.1%
2010	1,093,247	−2.5%
2020	1,034,814	−5.3%

== Transportation ==
=== Rail ===
- JR West
  - Hokuriku Shinkansen (Tokyo to Tsuruga via Kurobe, Toyama City and Takaoka)
  - Takayama Main Line (Inotani to Toyama City)
  - Himi Line
  - Jōhana Line
- JR Central
  - Takayama Main Line (Gifu to Inotani)
- Ainokaze Toyama Railway (Kurikara, Ishikawa to Ichiburi, Niigata via Takaoka and Toyama City)
- Manyōsen (Third-sector tram system in Takaoka)
  - Shinminatokō Line
  - Takaoka Kidō Line
- Toyama Chihō Railway
  - Main Line
  - Tateyama Line
  - Fujikoshi Line
  - Kamidaki Line
  - Toyama City Tram

=== Expressway ===
- Hokuriku Expressway
- Nōetsu Expressway
- Tōkai-Hokuriku Expressway

=== Air ===
- Toyama Airport (TOY)

==== Domestic ====
- Tokyo: 1 hr
- Sapporo: 1 hr 20 min

==== International ====
- Dalian: 2 hr 30 min via China Southern Airlines
- Shanghai: 2 hr 30 min via Shanghai Airlines

== Culture ==
=== Tourist sites ===
- Tateyama Kurobe Alpine Route
- Kurobe Gorge Railway
- Unazuki Onsen
- Gokayama (UNESCO World Heritage Site)
- Mitsui Outlet Park, Hokuriku Oyabe

==== UNESCO World Heritage Cultural Sites ====
- Gokayama Historical Village (Nanto City)

==== National Treasures of Japan ====
- Zuiryū-ji Temple (Takaoka City)

=== Festivals ===
==== Spring ====
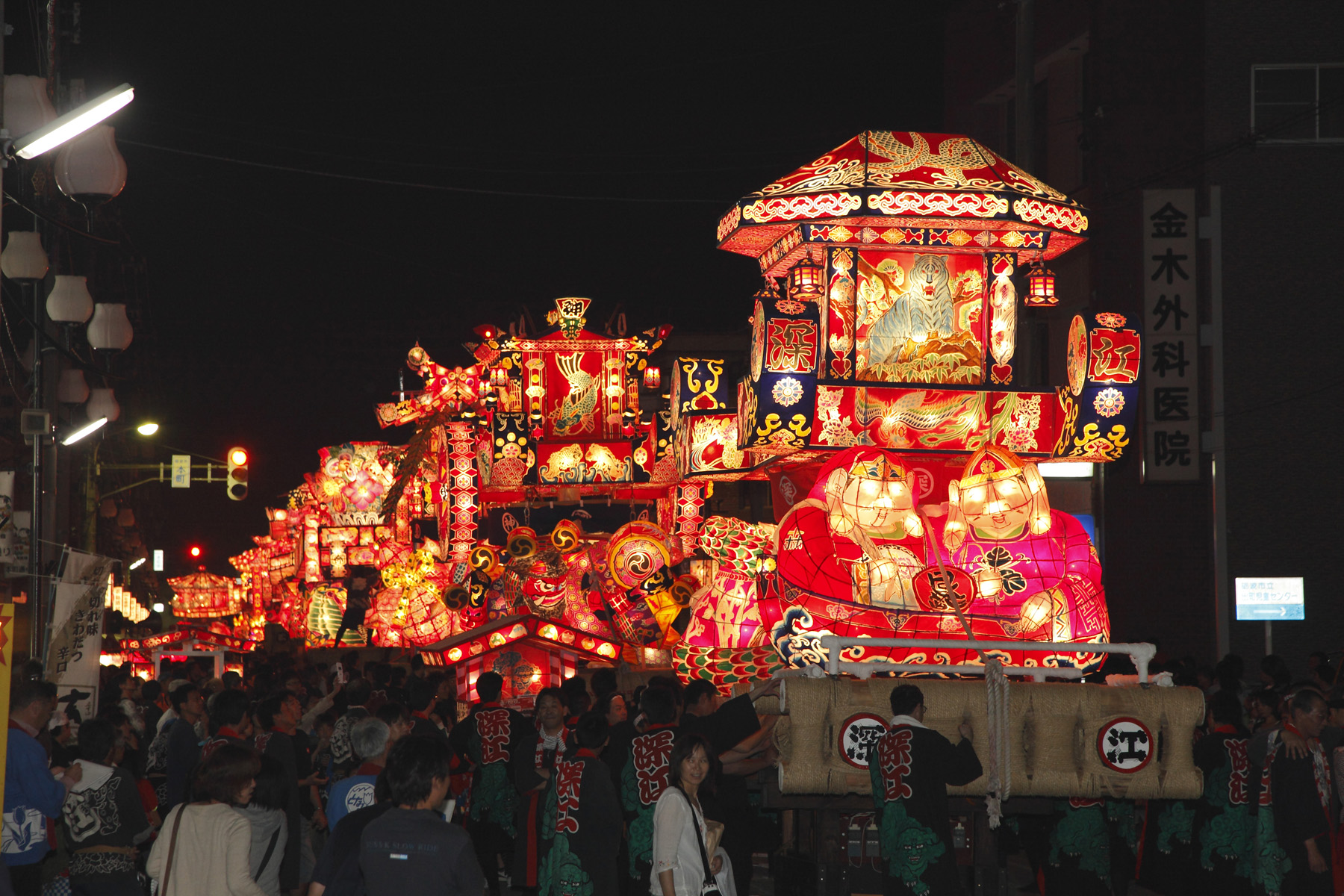
Tonami Yotaka Festival (June)

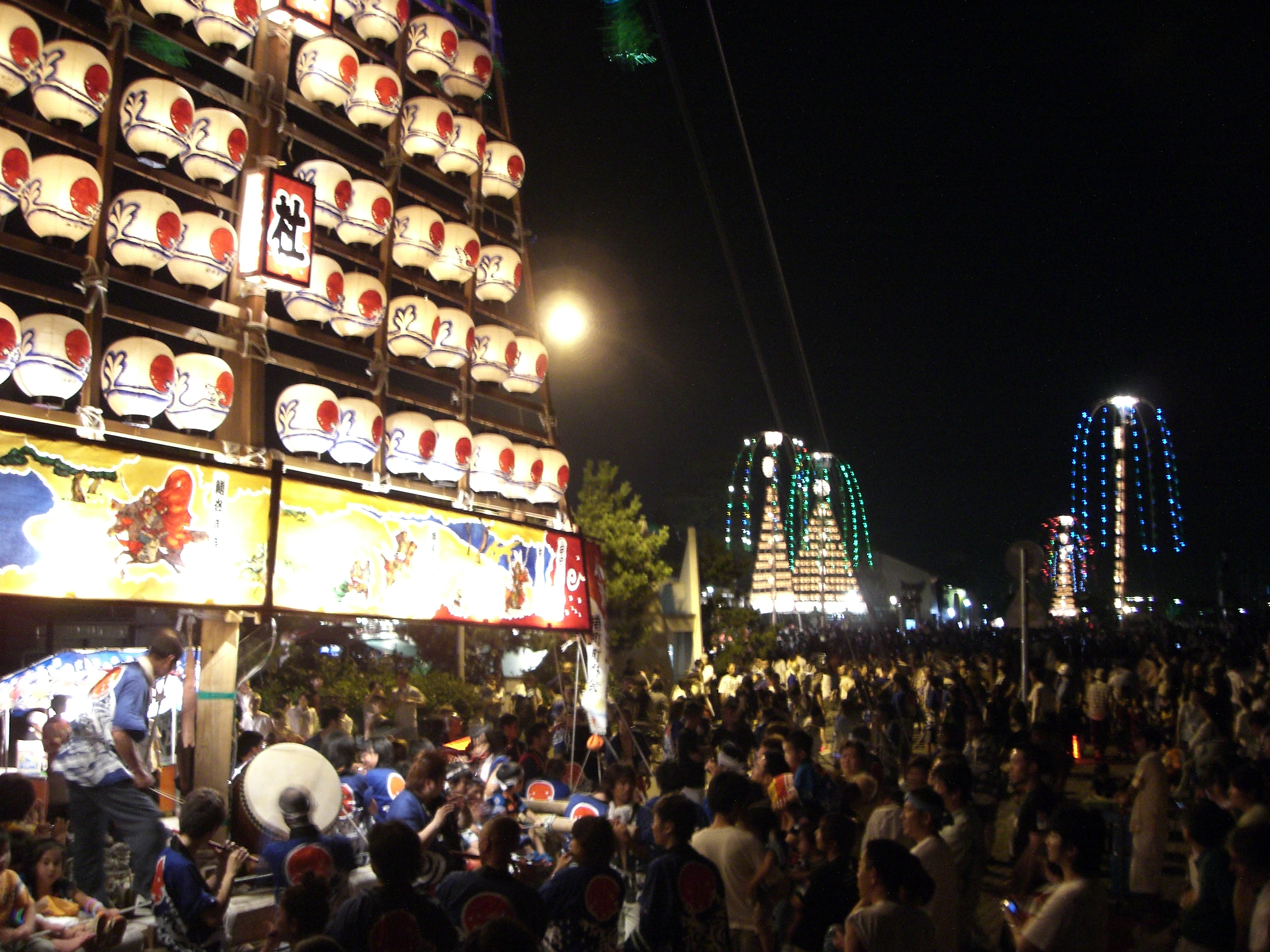
Uozu Tatemon Festival (August)

- All Japan Chindon Competition (Toyama City (Toyama Castle Park), Mid April
- Tonami Tulip Fair (Tonami City), May
- Marumage Festival (Himi City), May 17

==== Summer ====
- Sassa Narimasa Sengoku Era Festival (Toyama City), Late July
- Japan Wildlife Film Festival (Toyama Prefecture), Early August

==== Fall ====
- Toyama Festival (Toyama City), Sept. 1
- Owara Kaze no Bon (Toyama City (Yatsuo Area)), Sept. 1–3

==== Winter ====
- Nanto Toga Soba Festival (Nanto City (Toga Village Area)), Mid Feb.

=== Regional foods ===
- Trout Sushi (Masuzushi)
- White Shrimp (Shiro Ebi)
- Matured Yellow Tail (Buri)
- Firefly Squid (Hotaru Ika)
- Fish Paste (Kamaboko)

=== Regional sake ===
- Tateyama (立山)
- Narimasa (成政)
- Masuizumi (満寿泉)
- Sanshoraku (三笑楽)

== Sports ==
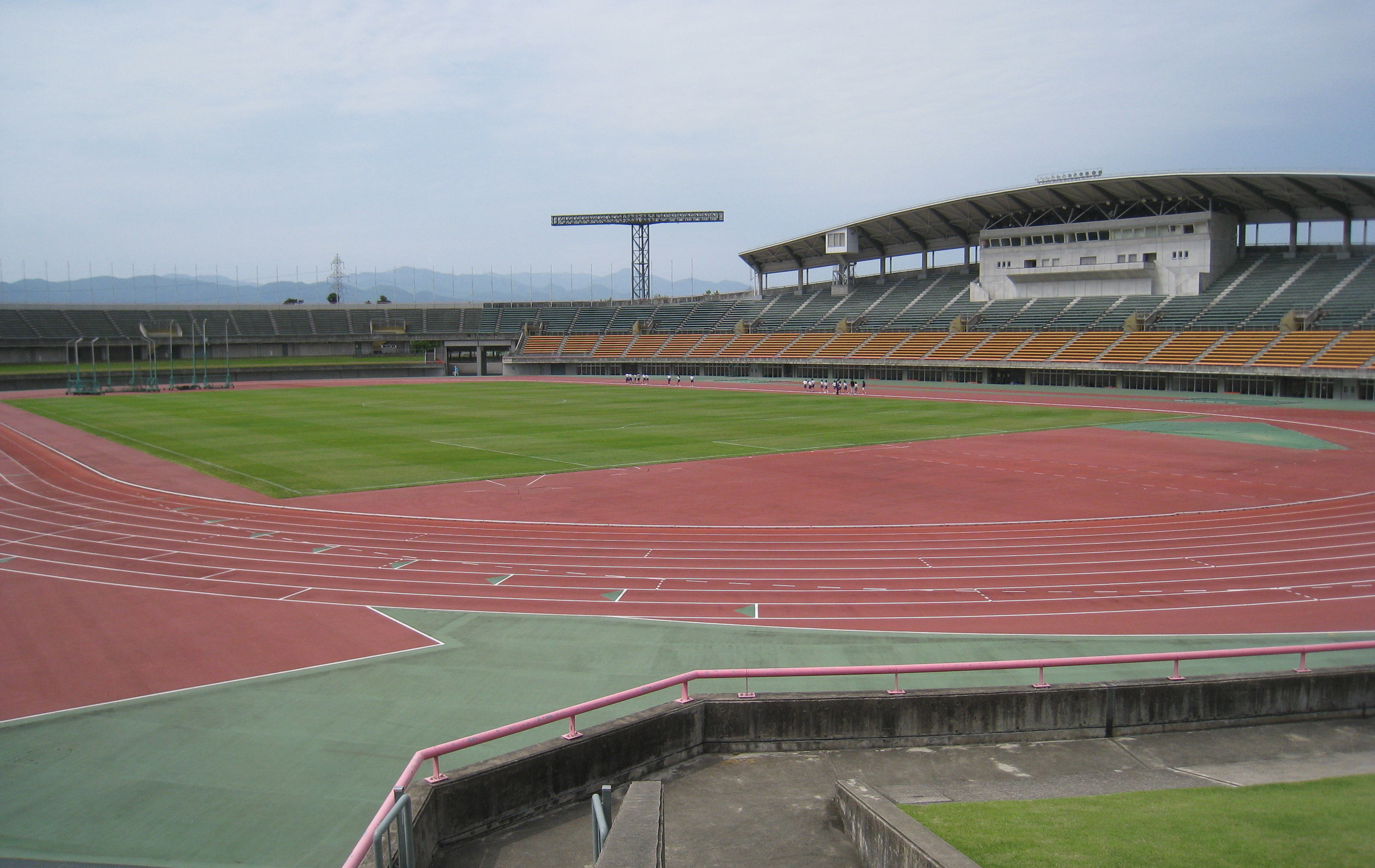
Toyama Stadium

The sports teams listed below are based in Toyama.

- Football: Kataller Toyama (Toyama City)
- Basketball: Toyama Grouses (Toyama City)
- Baseball: Toyama Thunderbirds (Toyama City)
- Rugby Union: Takaoka Mariners (Takaoka)

== International relations ==
- (China) Liaoning Province, since May 9, 1984
- (Brazil) São Paulo State, since July 18, 1985
- (United States) Oregon State, since October 19, 1991
- (Russia) Primorsky Region, since August 26, 1992
- (Switzerland) Basel-Stadt, since October 26, 2009
- (India) Andhra Pradesh State, since December 29, 2015
