= Nekomata (disambiguation) =

Nekomata are a kind of cat yōkai described in Japanese folklore.

Nekomata may also refer to:

- Nekomata Okayu, Japanese VTuber
- Nekomata Station, train station in Kurobe, Toyama

== See also ==
- Catgirl (disambiguation)
