= Scatman =

Scatman may refer to:

- Scatman John (1942–1999), American vocalist and musician
  - "Scatman (Ski-Ba-Bop-Ba-Dop-Bop)" and "Scatman's World" Scatman John's most famous songs
- Scatman Crothers (1910–1986), U.S. musician and actor

== See also ==
- Search for "Scatman"
- Scat (disambiguation)
  - Scot (disambiguation)
  - Skat (disambiguation)
- Atman (disambiguation)
- Catman (disambiguation)
  - Cat-Man (disambiguation)
