= Cat People =

Cat People may refer to:

- Cat People (1942 film), a horror film starring Simone Simon
- Cat People (1982 film), a remake of the 1942 film starring Nastassja Kinski
- "Cat People (Putting Out Fire)", a song by David Bowie and the title song from the 1982 film
- Cat People (TV series), a 2021 American Netflix documentary series
- Cat People (comics), a humanoid species from the Marvel Comics universe
- Cat people and dog people, personality types

== See also ==
- Catwoman (disambiguation)
- Catgirl (disambiguation)
- Catman (disambiguation)
- Cat lady (disambiguation)
- Cat (Red Dwarf), a fictional character in the sitcom Red Dwarf
- "Cat Person", 2017 short story in the New Yorker
- Cat Person (film), a 2023 psychological thriller film
- List of fictional catpeople
