= Nekomusume =

Nekomusume (猫娘) means "the daughter of a cat". The literal translation, however, is actually "cat daughter" or "cat girl"; "neko" means "cat" in Japanese and "musume" means "daughter" or "girl". Nekomusume can refer to:

- A specific transformation of the folkloric Bakeneko
- Catgirls, female fictional characters or cosplayers with nekomimi (cat ears) in Japanese popular culture
- Bannou Bunka Neko-Musume, a manga series with several on-screen adaptations
- Neko-Musume, a character in manga and anime series GeGeGe no Kitarō

== See also ==
- Catgirl (disambiguation)
