= SCATS (disambiguation) =

SCATS as an acronym may refer to:

- Sydney Coordinated Adaptive Traffic System, an urban traffic control system
- Southern Counties Agricultural Trading Society, an agricultural supplies and services company in England, functioning in the 1950s and until it became part of Mole Valley Farmers in 2002
- Study Centre for the Advancement of Technology and Social Welfare, a Sri Lankan voluntary organisation
- StapleCross Amateur Theatrical Society, a drama group

Scats may also refer to:

- Scatophagidae, a family of fish

== See also ==
- Scat (disambiguation)
