= Catgirl (disambiguation) =

Catgirl or "nekomusume" is a female character with cat ears or other traits on an otherwise human body.

Catgirl or Cat Girl may also refer to:

- Cat Girl, a 1957 British-American fantasy film
- Catgirl (DC Comics), a fictional character
  - Carrie Kelley in The Dark Knight Strikes Again
  - Kitrina Falcone, a Catwoman supporting character
  - Duela Dent, a Batman supporting character

== See also ==
- List of catgirls
- Catwoman (disambiguation)
- Nekomusume (disambiguation)
- Cat and Girl, a 1999 webcomic
- Bakeneko, a Japanese yōkai, a cat that has changed into a supernatural creature
  - Nekomata, a Japanese yōkai
