= Qian Tai Lang =

Qian Tai Lang may refer to following Japanese individuals whose name can be transliterated to Kanji pronounced by Hanyu pinyin:

- 浅太郎 (Qiǎntàiláng), a masculine Japanese given name
- 謙太郎 (Qiāntàiláng), 謙太朗 (Qiāntàilǎng), a masculine Japanese given name
