= Catman =

Catman or Cat-Man may refer to:

== In animation ==
- A recurring character in the Adult Swim cartoon Perfect Hair Forever
- A fictional superhero within the world of The Fairly OddParents portrayed by Adam West and parodying his portrayal of Batman.

== In comics ==
- Cat-Man and Kitten, a pair of superhero characters created by Charles M. Quinlan and Irwin Hasen
- Catman (DC Comics), a DC Comics character that has appeared in opposition to Batman and other characters
- Cat-Man (Marvel Comics), the name of three fictional characters in the Marvel Universe

== In films and videos ==
- A fictional character in several animated music videos for ska group The Planet Smashers
- US Catman, the hero of a series of martial arts films

== In literature ==
- "Catman", a 1974 short story by Harlan Ellison
- David J. Catman, the co-creator of the webtoon series Live with Yourself!

== In mythology and folklore ==
- Werecat, a feline therianthropic creature
- Hombre Gato (translated "Catman" in English), a half-man, half-cat creature in South American legend

== Nicknames ==
- Catman (musician), David Taieb (born 1971), French musician and producer
- Peter Criss or Eric Singer from the band, Kiss
- René Chartrand, "The Catman of the Hill", who takes care of the Canadian parliamentary cats
- Barry Green (hunter), Australian varmint hunter and wildlife conservationist
- Stalking Cat, a man who surgically altered his body to resemble that of a tiger
- Catmando, a cat who served as joint leader of Britain's Official Monster Raving Loony Party from 1999 to 2002
- Troy West, a Geelong Football Club mega fan known for wearing cat makeup and outfits to games
- Strange Catman, Kentaro Jin, Japanese and Australian Internet celebrity

== See also ==
- Cat People (disambiguation)
- Xatman
