= Cat lady (disambiguation) =

A cat lady is a cultural archetype of a woman who owns many cats

Cat Lady or Crazy Cat Lady may also refer to:

- Eleanor Abernathy (Crazy Cat Lady), a fictional character from the animated television series The Simpsons
- Crazy Old Cat Lady, a fictional character from the animated television series Codename: Kids Next Door
- The Cat Lady, a 2012 horror adventure video game
- "Childless cat ladies", a comment made by United States Senator JD Vance
- Crazy cat lady syndrome, a term coined by news organizations to describe toxoplasmosis

== See also ==
- Catwoman, a fictional character from DC Comics (most often Batman titles)
- Catgirl (disambiguation)
- Cat People (disambiguation)
