= Catwoman (disambiguation) =

Catwoman is a DC Comics character.

Catwoman may also refer to:

- Catwoman (film), a 2004 film based on the DC character
- Catwoman (video game), a video game based on the 2004 film
- DC Showcase: Catwoman, also titled as simply Catwoman, a 2011 short animated film
- Catwoman: Guardian of Gotham, a 1999 graphic novel by Doug Moench with art by Jim Balent published by DC Comics
- Catwoman: When in Rome, a 2004 DC Comics series
- Holly Robinson (character), a DC Comics character, ally of Selina Kyle, who temporarily replaced her as Catwoman
- Jocelyn Wildenstein, American socialite with extensive cosmetic surgery resulting in a cat-like appearance
- "Catwoman", a 1992 song by Shakespears Sister from the album Hormonally Yours

== Other uses ==
- Soo Catwoman, also known as Soo Lucas, a member of Britain's 1970s punk rock subculture
- Cat-Women of the Moon, an influential 1953 science fiction film
- Feline human–animal hybrids, fictional or mythical entities that incorporate elements from both humans and cats

== See also ==
- Catgirl (disambiguation)
- Catman (disambiguation)
- Cat People (disambiguation)
