= Kentarō =

- Gender: Male

Origin
- Word/name: Japanese
- Meaning: Different meanings depending on the kanji used

Kentarō, Kentaro, Kentarou or Kentaroh (written using such kanji as 健太郎, 健太朗, 憲太郎, 賢太郎, 建太郎, 拳太郎, 謙太郎 or 謙太朗) is a masculine Japanese given name. Notable people with the name include:

- DJ Kentaro (born 1982), Japanese DJ, remixer
- Kentaro Asahi (朝日 健太郎; born 1975), Japanese volleyball player
- Kentarō Haneda (羽田 健太郎; 1949–2007), Japanese composer, pianist
- Kentaro Hashimoto (橋本 健太郎; born 1980), Japanese baseball player
- Kentaro Hayashi (林 健太郎; born 1972), Japanese football player
- Kentarō Ishii (石井 健太郎; born 1992), Japanese shogi player
- Kentaro Ishikawa (石川 健太郎; born 1970), Japanese football player
- Kentarō Itō (伊藤 健太郎), Japanese voice actor
- Kentaro Jin, also known as Strange Catman, Australian and Japanese Internet celebrity
- Kentaro Kai (甲斐 健太郎; born 1994), Japanese football player
- Kentaro Kakoi (圍 謙太朗; born 1991), Japanese football player
- Kentaro Kawasaki (川崎 健太郎; born 1982), Japanese football player
- Kentaro Kawatsu (河津 憲太郎; 1914–1970), Japanese swimmer and Olympic medalist
- Kentarō Kobayashi (小林 賢太郎; born 1973), Japanese comedian, theatre director, manga artist
- Kentaro Minagawa (皆川 賢太郎; born 1977), Japanese alpine skier
- Kentaro Miura (三浦 建太郎; 1966-2021), Japanese manga artist
- Kentaro Moriya (森谷 賢太郎; born 1988), Japanese football player
- Kentaro Nakamoto (中本 健太郎; born 1982), Japanese runner
- Kentaro Nishimura (西村 健太朗; born 1985), Japanese baseball player
- Kentaro Oi (大井 健太郎; born 1984), Japanese football player
- Kentarō Ōtani (大谷 健太郎; born 1965), Japanese film director
- Kentaro Sakaguchi (坂口 健太郎; born 1991), Japanese model and actor
- Kentaro Sakai (栄井 健太郎; born 1975), Japanese football player
- Kentaro Sato (composer) (佐藤 賢太郎; born 1981), Japanese composer and conductor, also known as Ken-P
- Kentaro Sato (footballer) (佐藤 健太郎; born 1984), Japanese football player
- Kentaro Sawada (沢田 謙太郎; born 1970), Japanese football player
- Kentaro Seki (関 憲太郎; born 1986), Japanese football player
- Kentaro Sekimoto (関本 賢太郎; born 1978), Japanese baseball player
- Kentaro Shiga (志賀 賢太郎; born 1974), Japanese wrestler
- Kentaro Shigematsu (重松 健太郎; born 1991), Japanese football player
- Kentaro Shimizu (清水 健太郎; born 1952), Japanese actor and singer
- Kentaro Takada (高田 健太郎; born 1983), Japanese football player
- Kentaro Takahashi (高橋 健太郎; born 1995), Japanese volleyball player
- Kentaro Takekuma (竹熊 健太郎; born 1960), Japanese manga artist
- Kentaro Toyama, Japanese computer scientist
- Kentaro Uramoto (浦本 賢太郎; born 1982), Japanese football player
- Kentaro Wada (和田 健太郎; born 1996), Japanese football player
- Kentaro Yabuki (矢吹 健太朗; born 1980), Japanese manga artist
- Kentaro Yoshida (吉田 賢太郎; born 1980), Japanese footballer

== Fictional characters ==
- Mr. Kentaro Moto, character name of Mr. Moto in a series of films, portrayed him as a detective by Peter Lorre
- Kentaro Ichinose (一の瀬 賢太郎), character in the Maison Ikkoku series
- Kentaro Kyoutani (京谷 賢太郎), a character from Haikyu!! with the position of wing spiker from Aoba Johsai High
- Kentaro Osada (長田 健太郎), character in the Inubaka: Crazy for Dogs series
- Kentaro Saeki, character portrayed by Haruma Miura in the film The Eternal Zero
- Kentaro Sakata (坂田 健太朗), character in the anime of the Love Hina series
- Kentaro Tachibana (立花 健太郎), character in the Hanebado! series
- Kentaro Takaoka (高岡 拳太郎), character in the Tiger Mask series
