= Nekomata Station =

Train station in Toyama, Japan

Nekomata Station 猫又駅
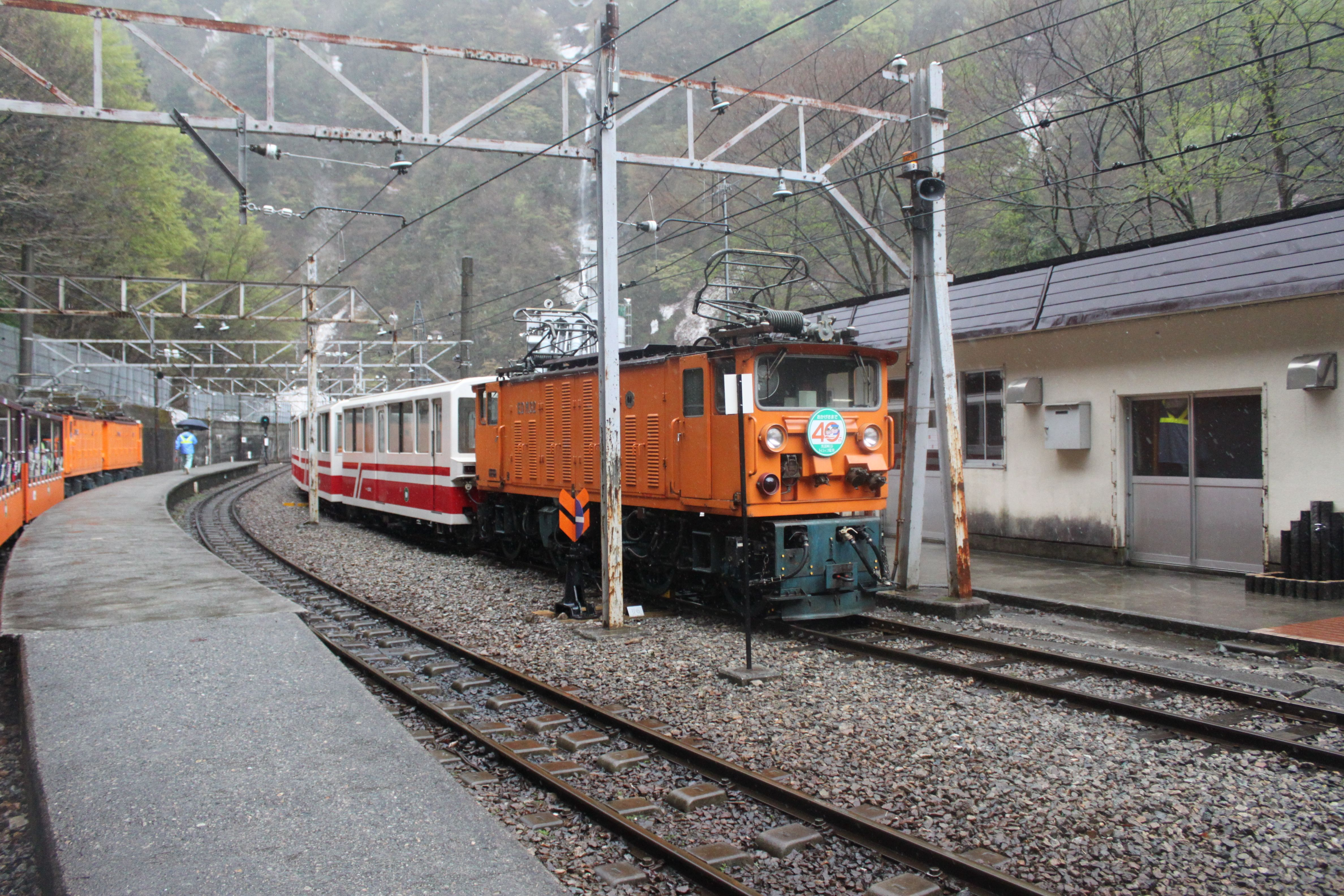
- Nekomata Station in 2011

General information
- Location: Kurobe, Toyama; Japan
- Coordinates: 36°44′59″N 137°38′31″E
- Elevation: 358 m (1,175 ft)
- Owner: Kurobe Gorge Railway
- Line: Kurobe Gorge Main Line
- Distance: 11.8 km from Unazuki Station
- Platforms: Island platform
- Tracks: Two

Other information
- Status: Operational; off-limit of the public

History
- Opened: October 23, 1926
Location
- Location within Toyama Prefecture Location within Chubu region Location within Japan

Nekomata Station (Japanese: 猫又駅, Hepburn: Nekomata-eki) is a railway station operated by Kurobe Gorge Railway in Kurobe, Toyama Prefecture, Japan.

It is the only station in Japan that has the Japanese word for "cat" in its name. The station is not accessible to the public, but following the 2024 Noto earthquake, Nekomata Station was open to the general public from October 2024 to September 2026.

== Etymology ==
Station signboard with the text "The only train station in Japan with "cat" in its name" (「猫」がつく、日本で唯一の駅)

There are two theories for why the station was named Nekomata (猫又). One suggests that it was derived from a local legend about a cliff where a mouse, unable to climb it while being pursued by a cat, found itself trapped. As a result, both the mouse and the cat were forced to turn back. Another is believed that the station name was derived from the Nekomata, a mythical cat yōkai. It is the only station in Japan that includes the word "neko" (猫; lit. 'cat').

== Location ==
The train station is located along the Kurobe River. It is situated 358 meters above sea level. Kansai Electric Power's Kurobe River No. 2 Power Plant is located across the river. It is about 50 minutes from Unazuki Station.

Due to its location, the train station is only accessible from April to the end of November.

== History ==
Nekomata Station started operation on October 23, 1926. The station was built for construction workers working at the Nekomata Dam. At the time it was the terminus of the Kurobe Private Railway. It was then used as an intermediate station for train operators and the maintenance and management crew of the Kurobe River No. 2 Power Plant.

After the 2024 Noto earthquake, Kanetsuri Bridge, part of the Kurobe Gorge Railway, was severely damage by falling rocks and the station was used as a turning station. The platform was reopened for general passengers on October 5, 2024. Following the opening of the station to general passengers and as an effort to make the station widely known, Kurobe Gorge Railway appointed a cat as the "honorary assistant" of the station.

In 2025, Kurobe Gorge Railway launched the mascot “Mata-nyan” for the station. On October 1, 2026, the Kurobe Gorge Railway returned into normal service and Nekomata Station was closed to general public.

== Structure ==
Nekomata Station has only one platform and two tracks. The platform is made of wood and was around 60 meters long before it was opened to general passengers; then it was extended to 100 meters. The station also has a temporary tourist information center, and an observation deck overlooking the Kurobe Gorge.

== See also ==
- Tama, a cat who was appointed honorary stationmaster of a railway station
