= Bakeneko yūjo =

Yōkai

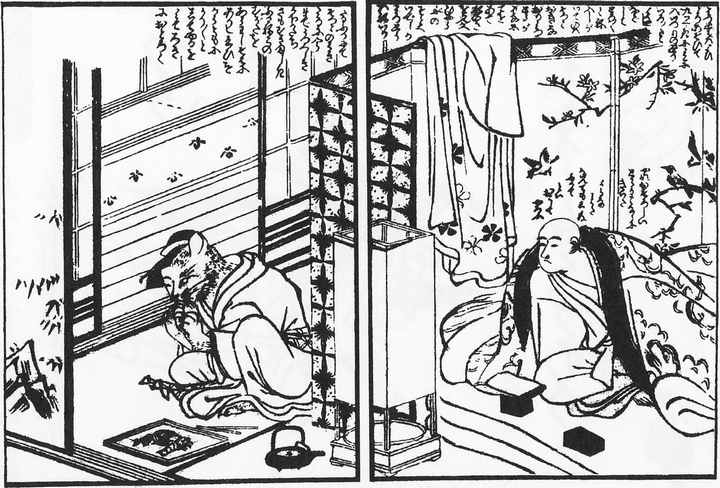
From Bakemono Yotsugi Hachinoki by Torii Kiyonaga. A scene where a courtesan transforms into a bakeneko late at night and gnaws on a shrimp.

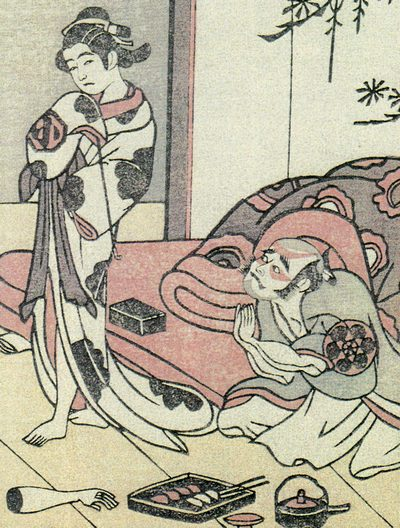
From Hanazumō Genji no Haridashi by Torii Kiyotsune. What appears to be a leftover human arm lies at the courtesan's feet.

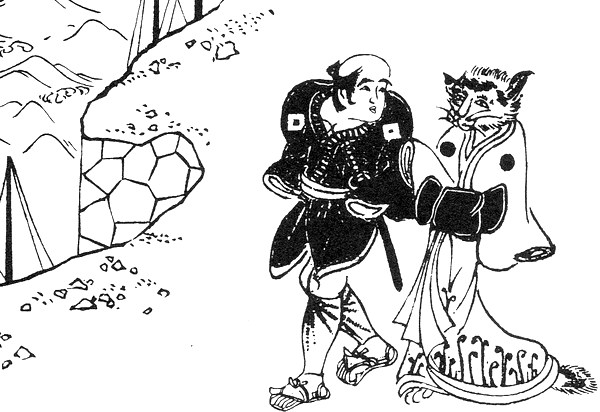
From Urikotoba by Isoda Koryūsai. A bakeneko courtesan walking near the sea in Shinagawa.

Bakeneko Yūjo (Japanese: 化猫遊女, lit. "Werecat Courtesan") is a type of character that gained popularity appearing in Japanese kibyōshi, sharebon, hanashibon (books of funny stories), and kabuki during the Edo period. It was a character created in fiction based on rumors circulating in Shinagawa-juku at the time that claimed "there are serving wenches (prostitutes) who are bakeneko." The character is depicted as a yūjo (courtesan) working in the red-light district who transforms into a bakeneko late at night.

== Overview ==
The typical depiction of a bakeneko yūjo involves a courtesan spending the night with a customer in the pleasure quarters. After the customer falls asleep, the courtesan secretly rises. When the customer notices and looks, the courtesan has transformed into a bakeneko with a cat's face and a human body, and is secretly eating food.

In the 1781 (Tenmei 1) kibyōshi Bakemono Yotsugi Hachinoki (化物世櫃鉢木), and the 1802 (Kyōwa 2) work Bakemono Ichidaiki (化物一代記)—which is a retitled compilation of the former and other books—there is a scene where a customer in a Shinagawa-juku brothel peeks into the courtesans' room late at night. He sees Ideno, a courtesan he is familiar with, transformed into a bakeneko and crunching on a shrimp, head and all. This bakeneko is described as a filial daughter who is undergoing shapeshifting training in order to inherit the house of her parents, who were killed by a hunter. Similarly, in the 1798 (Kansei 10) work Harakazumi Heso no Hanashi (腹鼓臍噺曲), there is a scene where a customer witnesses a courtesan transformed into a bakeneko gnawing on a shrimp. In the 1775 (An'ei 4) kabuki play Hanazumō Genji no Haridashi (花相撲源氏張胆), there is a scene where a bakeneko yūjo scatters and eats fish.

In addition to those that eat seafood, there are also dangerous bakeneko yūjo that eat humans. In the kyōgen picture book illustrating the aforementioned Hanazumō Genji no Haridashi from 1775 (An'ei 4), there is a scene where what appears to be a leftover human arm is lying at the courtesan's feet. In the 1796 (Kansei 8) kibyōshi Kosame Murasame Mikoshi no Matsu (小雨衆雨見越松毬) (Note: "Amashu" (雨衆) is originally a single character consisting of the rain radical (雨) over the character for multitude (衆). The notation "Amashu" (雨衆) references the "Aohon Gedaiharikomishū Saimoku" included in Sankō Shoshi Kenkyū Issue 9, edited by the Reference and Bibliography Department of the National Diet Library.), there is a scene where a customer looks into the courtesan's room and sees her gnawing on a human arm. However, in the latter example, the courtesan is drawn in human form rather than as a bakeneko, and the story has a punchline revealing that what looked like a human arm was simply a mistake for a sweet potato.

== Origins ==
The origin is said to be rumors that arose in the Edo period claiming there was a serving wench who was a bakeneko at an inn called "Iseya" in Shinagawa-juku. The 1776 (An'ei 5) hanashibon (book of humorous stories) titled Urikotoba contains two stories titled "Nekomata", and includes the phrase "These days, the nekomata rumors are creepy," suggesting that such rumors existed prior to 1775 (An'ei 4). The 1788 (Tenmei 8) sharebon Hitome Zutsumi also mentions, "The Monster Iseya is in the southern station (Shinagawa). The cat [eating] the arm/shin on the uplands of Kanda," (Note: Cited from Nobuhiro 1991, p. 72.) and the 1789 (Kansei 1) sharebon Mawashi Makura states, "There was an instance where an old tiger cat transformed into a courtesan at Kurata in Shinagawa." Thus, regardless of whether a bakeneko actually existed, it appears certain that such rumors themselves were real.

Shinagawa-juku was popular as a pleasure quarter for country samurai and monks, but as these rumors spread throughout Edo, the Iseya came to be called "Bakemono Iseya" (Monster Iseya) or "Obake Iseya" (Ghost Iseya). As evidenced by two establishments named "Iseya" being listed in the 1801 (Kyōwa 1) Shinagawa guide Bura Chōchin, "Iseya" was a common trade name. Therefore, names like "Bakemono Iseya" likely became established to distinguish it from other Iseyas. Even in the later historical novel Hanshichi Torimonocho, set in 1862 (Bunkyū 2), there is a line saying, "Iseya in Shinagawa... though I don't mean the famous Bake-Iseya," (Note: Cited from Nobuhiro 1991, p. 73.) and in the performance of Shinagawa Shinjū by Kokontei Shinshō (5th generation), it is mentioned: "There were good brothels in Shinagawa. Dozō-Sagami, Shimazaki, Obake-Iseya."

These rumors were turned into characters during the An'ei and Tenmei eras (from 1772 to 1788) appearing in kibyōshi and other works. Within these works, they came to be depicted in forms completely unrelated to the actual rumors in Shinagawa, eventually walking on their own as the character known as the bakeneko yūjo. In the aforementioned Bakemono Yotsugi Hachinoki, there is a scene where the customer who peeks at the bakeneko yūjo says, "It's just like the story I heard somewhere," indicating that such rumors existed in reality in Shinagawa. Because the names of the serving wenches at Iseya ended with the suffix "-no" (野), the names of bakeneko yūjo, such as Ideno in Bakemono Yotsugi Hachinoki, also often end in "-no".

Reasons suggested for why courtesans were likened to bakeneko include: courtesans were called by the alias "Neko" (a pun on "sleeping child" or "cat"); many courtesans actually kept cats; the brothel, isolated from the outside world, was a non-realistic space, making the courtesans inside seem like mysterious beings in a sense; the mysterious nature of cats as animals became linked to this image of the mysterious courtesan; the confined environment where women were locked away in brothels allowed gloomy emotions to accumulate, easily becoming the basis for yōkai folklore; and additionally, because it was considered rude for a courtesan to eat in front of a customer, they would eat secretly in corridors or the "lowly room" (the courtesans' dining room), and to anyone who accidentally witnessed such a scene, it would have appeared as an eerie spectacle. At Zōjō-ji temple, located very close to Shinagawa, there was an incident in 1852 (Kaei 5) where the head priest broke the precepts, disguised himself as a doctor, and frolicked with courtesans in the Yoshiwara pleasure quarters. Some view this as a link between the act of "transforming" (disguising) and the location of Shinagawa.

Furthermore, while bakeneko films from the Shōwa era onwards feature a typical scene where the cat "licks the oil of the andon lamp late at night," there is a theory that the figure of the bakeneko yūjo eating food late at night serves as the prototype for this.

== Footnotes ==
Notes

== Bibliography ==
- Adam Kabat (annotated by), ed. (2000). Ōedo Bakemono Hosomi (Great Edo Monster Details) (in Japanese). Shogakukan. ISBN 978-4-09-362113-7.
- Adam Kabat (2001). Yōkai Zōshi Kuzushiji Nyūmon (Introduction to Yōkai Storybooks Cursive Script) (in Japanese). Kashiwa Shobo. ISBN 978-4-7601-2092-5.
- Adam Kabat (2006). Momonga Tai Mikoshi-nyūdō: Edo no Bakemono-tachi (Momonga vs. Mikoshi-nyūdō: The Monsters of Edo) (in Japanese). Kodansha. ISBN 978-4-06-212873-5.
- Shinji Nobuhiro (1991). "Komon-zai Kōhen Komon Shinpō: Eiin to Chūshaku (5)". In Mamoru Takada (ed.). Edo Bungaku (Edo Literature) (in Japanese). Vol. 7. Perikansha. ISBN 978-4-8315-0535-4.
- Makoto Harada (2008). Nihon Bakemonoshi Kōza (Lecture on Japanese Monster History) (in Japanese). Gakkosha. ISBN 978-4-903063-17-1.
