= Catgirl =

Human female character with feline traits

A shōjo illustration of Wikipe-tan as a catgirl maid, with cat ears and a tail.

A catgirl (Japanese: 猫耳, Hepburn: nekomimi; lit. 'cat ear[s]') (Note: Also: nekomusume (猫娘; lit. 'cat girl')) or neko (Note: From Japanese neko (猫; lit. 'cat')) is a female character with feline traits, such as cat ears, a tail, or other feline characteristics on an otherwise human body. The equivalent male character is called a catboy. As a type of kemonomimi, catgirls are associated with Japanese anime and manga but may appear in other media.

Catgirls are descended from Edo and Shōwa period stories of villainous, shapeshifting cat monsters such as bakeneko or nekomata, whose cat traits signaled their villainous role to audiences. Postwar and more recent media have largely rehabilitated catgirls into docile, moe characters.

== Description ==
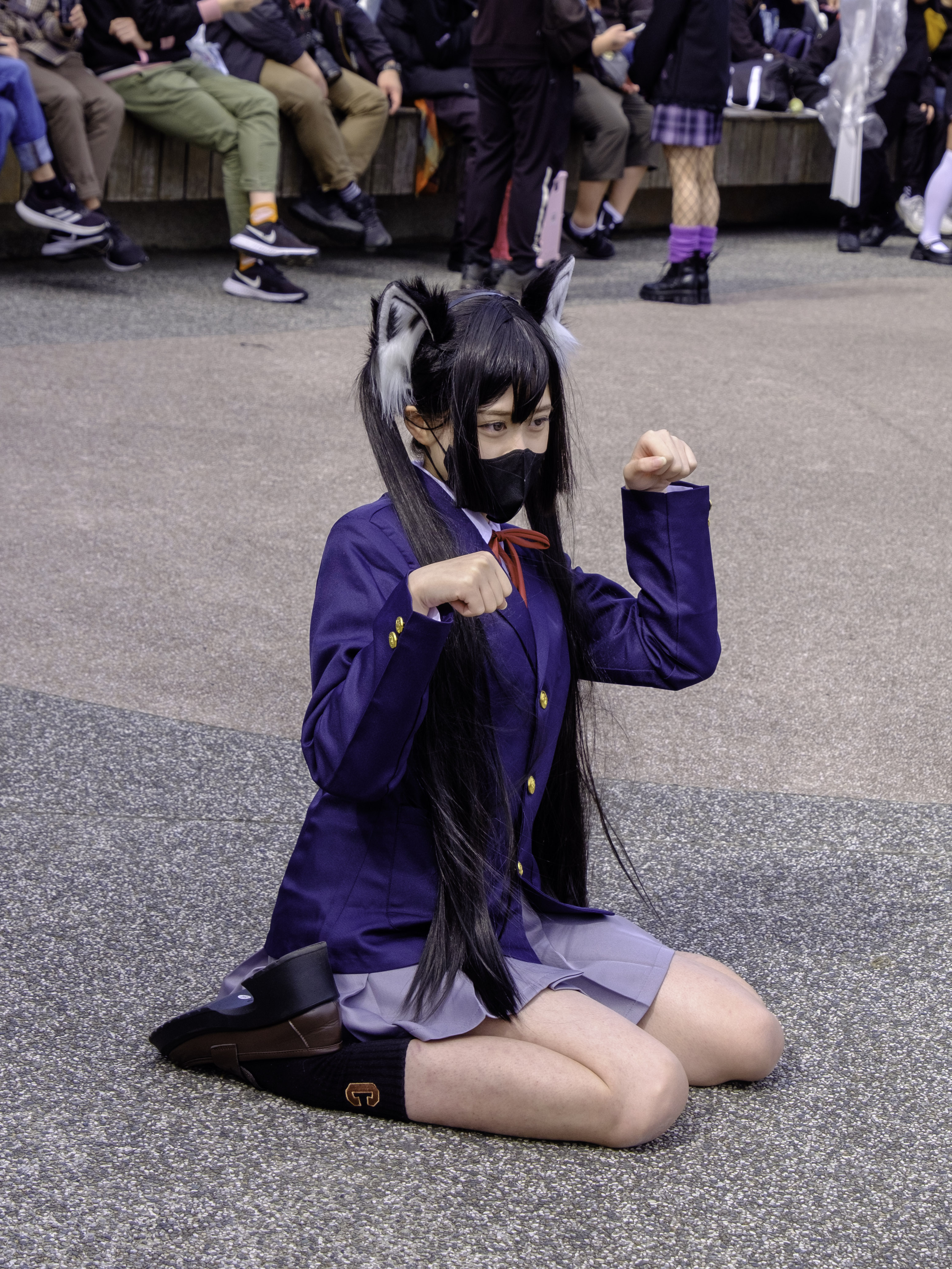
Catgirl cosplayers at fan conventions

The term catgirl is applied broadly to characters with some (often minor or superficial) cat physiology, and usually with at least one of either cat ears or a cat tail. Depending on the narrative, a catgirl may have cat-like mannerisms or verbal tics, or the ability to become a cat. A character who wears a cat ear headband, or who is momentarily depicted with cat ears to convey emotion, might also be called a catgirl within that context.

Whether a catgirl is correctly categorized as a furry, or whether a person who appreciates catgirls is considered kemonā, is hotly controversial amongst fans who do not wish to be associated with both furry and catgirl fandoms. This is further complicated by the loose definition of a catgirl as a character who may or may not possess certain cat traits, raising the question of which or how many such traits can be added before a character is better sorted as a furry.

== History ==
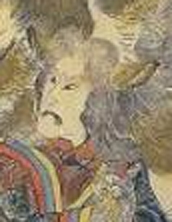
Actor Onoe Kikugorō III as a cat monster in Utagawa Kuniyoshi's The Fifty-three Stations of the Tōkaidō (1835)

The oldest mention of the term nekomusume (猫娘; lit. 'cat girl') comes from an 18th-century misemono in which a cat/woman hybrid was displayed. Stories of shapeshifting bakeneko prostitutes were popular during the Edo period. The ukiyo-e artist Utagawa Kuniyoshi (1798–1861) depicted the human forms of cat monsters as retaining cat ears, a trait that made them appear untrustworthy or frightening. The popularity of the nekomusume continued throughout the Edo and Shōwa periods, with many tales of cat/woman hybrids appearing in works such as the Ehon Sayoshigure (絵本小夜時雨) and Ansei zakki (安政雑記).

The villain in Kenji Miyazawa's 1924 work The 4th of Narcissus Month is the first example of a beautiful cat-eared woman in modern Japanese literature. In 1936, the nekomusume experienced a revival in kamishibai. Anime and manga such as Princess Knight (1953) and Star of Cottonland (1978) began to reimagine catgirls as cute and approachable characters rather than dangerous monsters, though these mediums can still cast antagonistic catgirls as in Dominion (1985) and Bakemonogatari (2009). In America, the DC Comics character Catwoman first appeared in 1940, and Cheetah first appeared in 1943.

By the 1990s, catgirls had become common in Japanese anime and manga. Catgirls have since been featured in various media worldwide. Enough of a subculture has developed for various themed conventions and events to be held around the world, such as Nekocon.

== As an aesthetic ==
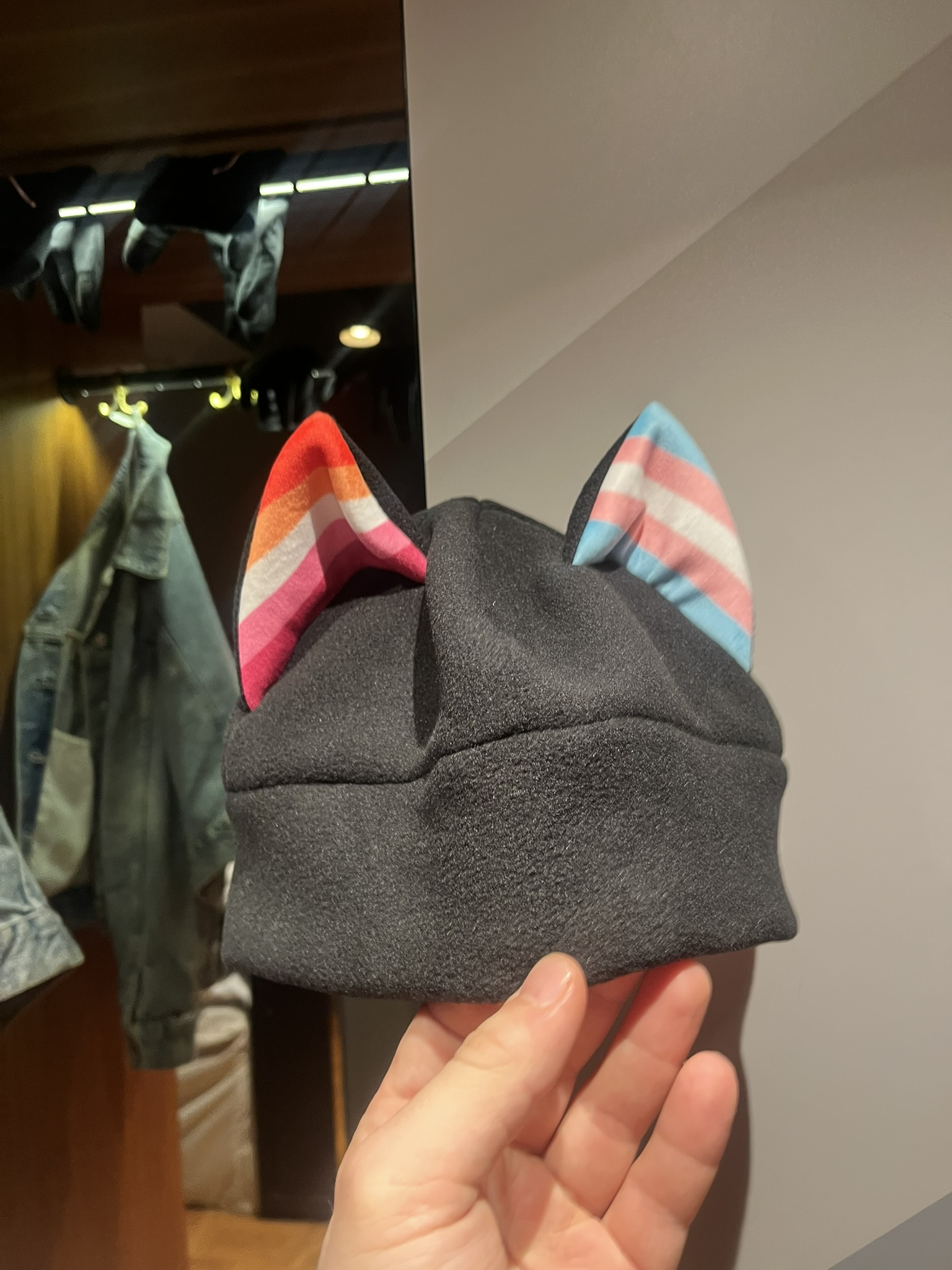
An example of cat ears used in queer clothing aesthetics – a tuque with sewn-on fleece cat ears in the patterns of the lesbian and trans flags.

In 1980s Japan, cat ears started to appear as a regular accessory in some youth, with limited continuing popularity. Recent cat ear headbands sometimes use motorized ears, which emote depending on the wearer's state of mind as determined from electroencephalography (EEG) electrodes.

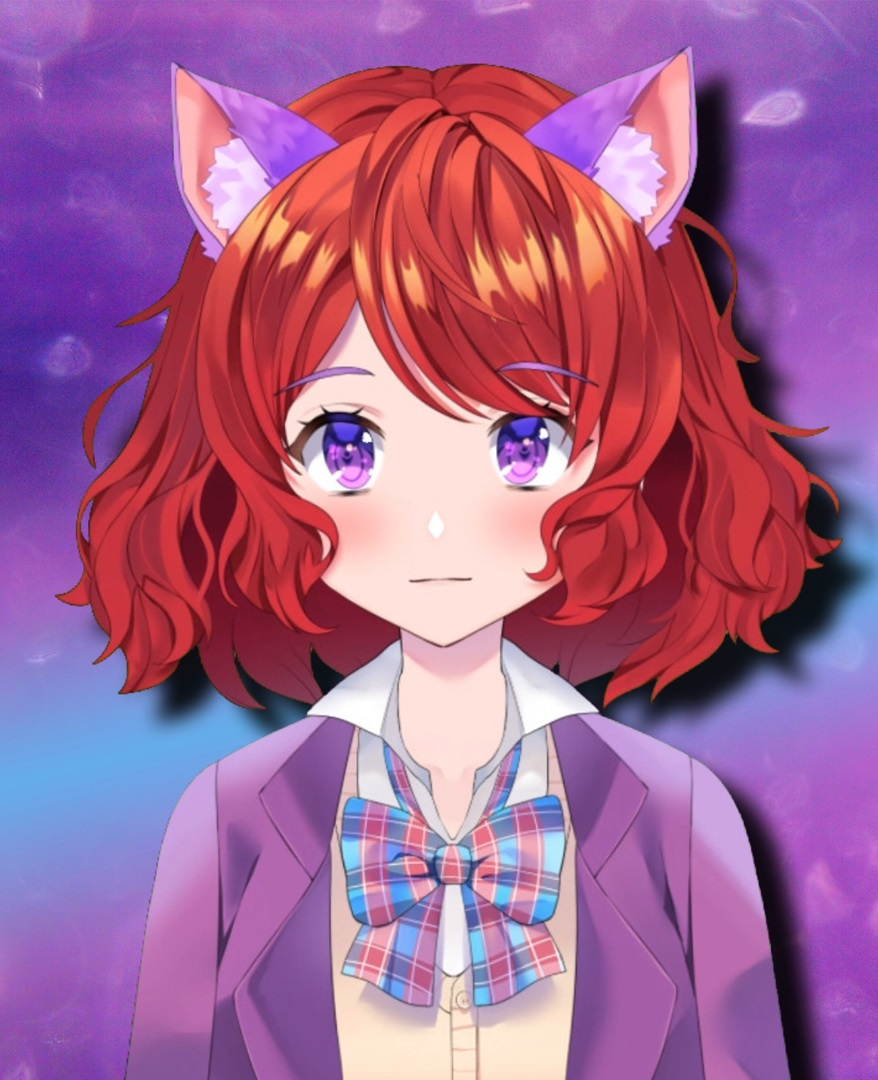
A VTuber catgirl avatar, featuring a transgender flag color pattern on the bowtie

Responsive cat ears may make it easier for audiences to discern a VTuber's expression. In 2024, four of the ten most subscribed VTubers were characters with animal ears. Some Japanese trains and train stations are also decorated with cat ears.

In the West, queer or transgender youth may adopt the catgirl as an ideal self, to be expressed on the Internet. In a 2022 survey of trans software engineers, 80.5% indicated they were "kinda" or "very" experienced with the catgirl concept. Some Internet memes flippantly advocate for genetically engineering catgirls, though this is entirely infeasible with current biomedical technology.

== Analysis ==
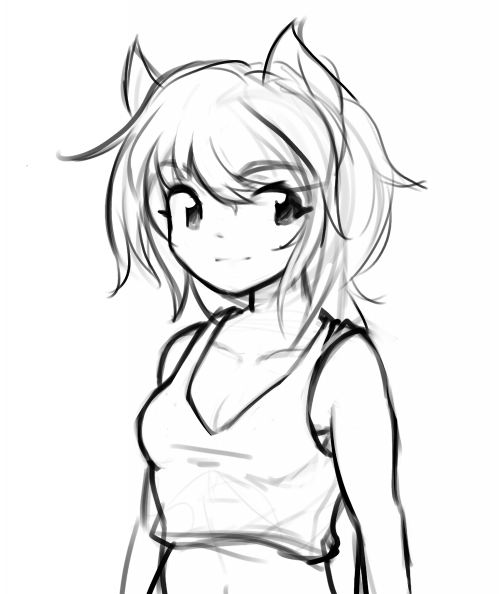
Minimal linework is needed to add cat ears to an existing character, which may have contributed to their popularity.

According to the Japanese magazine Da Vinci, the fact that cat ears can often be easily retrofitted to a character or costume without compromise has made the catgirl trope accessible and quickly popular. It is further suggested that the docile image created by cat ears stimulates the viewer's desire to protect cute animals. Japanese philosopher Hiroki Azuma has stated that catgirl characteristics such as cat ears and feline speech patterns are examples of moe-elements.

In a 2010 critique of the manga series Loveless, the feminist writer T. A. Noonan argued that, in Japanese culture, catgirl characteristics have a similar role to that of the Playboy Bunny in western culture, serving as a fetishization of youthful innocence. In a Games and Culture review of common oppressive tropes in fantasy video games, Heijman and Vervoort write that "catgirls exist to be wooed" just as "goblins exist to be slain".

== See also ==
- Animal roleplay
- Femboy
- Furry fandom
- Human–animal hybrid
- Kitsune
- List of fictional catpeople
- Nekomata
