= Dilman, Azerbaijan =

Dilman
- Municipality
- Location within Azerbaijan
- Coordinates: 40°43′51″N 48°30′28″E
- Country: Azerbaijan
- Rayon: Agsu

Population
  - Total: 905
- Time zone: UTC+4 (AZT)
  - Summer (DST): UTC+5 (AZT)

Dilman is a village and municipality in the Agsu Rayon of Azerbaijan. It has a population of 905. The municipality consists of the villages of Dilman, Xatman, and Hacıman.

The village is situated close to Shamakhy (previous capital of Azerbaijan during the Shirvanshah government). The village of Dilman has faced many conflicts throughout history, including the Persian wars with the Ottomans and Russians. The ethnic group of the village has preserved its Turkish roots through a long run of challenges.

The climate of Dilman is mysterious due its location around the Caucasian mountains and forests. Spring is the flower and strawberry season. Summer in Dilman is popular with tourists. Autumn is considered the romantic and hunting season. Winter is characterized by snow-based activities such as skiing and snow-cycling.

People of Dilman mostly work in Baku and in Shamakhy. In some areas surrounding Dilman, close to the river, there is a resort area as well as industrial plants for construction and wine producing.
