= List of fictional catpeople =

Popular depictions of catpeople

Wikipe-tan, an unofficial anthropomorphism of Wikipedia, as a catgirl

The following is a list of fictional catpeople, typically referred to as catgirls or catboys, characters with cat traits, such as cat ears, a cat tail, or other feline characteristics on an otherwise human body.

The list excludes humans who dress in cat costumes or otherwise identify as catpeople, anthropomorphic cats (e.g. Hello Kitty, Top Cat, The Cat in the Hat), and characters that fully transform between cat and human and not some in-between stage. It may include characters that wear a cat-themed costume, but only if there is strong recognition as a catgirl or catboy by news sources, as with Catwoman. For franchise characters, they are listed by their originating media, with ones in manga and anime listed separately from television and film.

== In anime and manga ==
Character(s)	Origin	Notes	Ref.
Felix/Ferris Argyle	Re:Zero	Crusch's knight and member of the Royal Guard, who is skilled in Water Magic, which includes healing, and refuses to use a sword. Despite having a feminine and cat-like appearance, Felix is a male.	
Beastfolk, including the protagonist Yaniko Sato	Chainsmoker Cat	Beastfolk is a humanoid cat race of alien whom appear almost entirely human except for cat tail(s) (some characters have more than one tail) and cat ears (with no human ears). Yaniko Sato is a female Beastfolk who lives in a small apartment building in modern-day Japan and is addicted to smoking, regardless of the damage to her environment, her psyche, or her family.	
Blair	Soul Eater	A black cat with exceptionally strong magic powers, including the power to transform into a young, alluring human woman among other spells, such as conjuring pumpkin-shaped explosions and summoning a giant flying pumpkin for transportation.	
Cat girl ninja	A Ninja and an Assassin Under One Roof	A ninja, and catgirl, who plans on murder Satoko but killed off in the middle of her transformation sequence.	
Cheshire Cat	Pandora Hearts	A chain that lives in a dimension created from Alice's memories. He resembles a human form of the Cheshire Cat from Alice's Adventures in Wonderland. Cheshire was actually Alice's pet cat from 100 years ago. The bell around his neck is the 'truth' from 100 years ago, later taken by Break. The Cheshire cat is a unique chain in that he does not need a contractor to leave the Abyss due to not residing there.	
Yuni/Cure Cosmo	Star Twinkle PreCure	A shapeshifting catgirl from Planet Rainbow whose people were petrified by Aiwarn's experiments. She maintains her cat ears and tail regardless of form.	
The Caitan race	Cat Planet Cuties	An alien race. They look and speak just like humans, except they have cat ears and tails.	
Dejiko	Di Gi Charat	Dejiko is a princess of a planet that is also called Di Gi Charat and she is also depicted as a catgirl which is highlighted by her ending each sentence with the cat sound 'nyo'.	
Fran	Reincarnated as a Sword	A 12-year-old Black Cat girl who fights with a powerful, legendary sword.	
Izutsumi	Delicious in Dungeon	A young tallman catgirl who was kidnapped and turned into a beast-man when she was six years old. She shares her form with the essence of a Big Cat, a monster resembling a large cat.	
Josette	From Bureaucrat to Villainess	A cat girl and apprentice maid at Grace's household. She at first fears Grace due to her cruelty, but starts to warm up to her after seeing her personality change.	
Kyaru	Princess Connect! Re:Dive	A catgirl and magic-user who can control monsters, and later joins the Gourmet Guild. She also appeared in the video game series of the same name.	
Leone	Akame ga Kill!	An assassin working for Night Raid for whom gathers intelligence and corroborates the mission requests.	
Mathilde	From Bureaucrat to Villainess	A cat girl maid who works for Grace. She can wield fire magic.	
Ichigo Momomiya	Tokyo Mew Mew	Series protagonist who transforms from a normal schoolgirl into a catgirl.	
Neferpitou	Hunter x Hunter	A kemonomimi-themed Chimera Ant and the firstborn of the Royal Guards. Pitou is one of the first Chimera Ants to fully utilize Nen with enough skill to be recognized by even Netero as a superior combatant.	
Nekos race	Nekopara	This is a race of catgirls who are still pets but can go on their own if they wear bells and pass a special training regimen. This includes protagonists Chocola, Vanilla, Maple, Cinnamon, Aazuki, and Coconut, among others. These characters also appear in a visual novel of the same name.	
Himari Noihara	Omamori Himari	Himari is a bakeneko, a shapeshifting demon cat, and the female protagonist of the series. She is known to other ayakashi as the Crimson Blade of Noihara (野井原の緋剣, Noihara no Hiken) due to her expert swordsmanship, and refers to herself as the "sword that protects" (護り刀, mamorigatana) Yuto.	
Panther Devas	Inuyasha	Consists of Tōran, Karan, Shunran, and Shūran from Inuyasha episode 75.	
Pondeli	I've Been Killing Slimes for 300 Years and Maxed Out My Level	An undead catgirl who died 40 years prior after becoming so lazy from boredom that she forgot to eat. After rising from death, Pondeli becomes a graveyard security guard, but is lonely without anyone keeping her company.	
Puma Sisters	Dominion: Tank Police	Two androids who resemble catgirls and were created as sex dolls, but rebelled against their programming and became criminals.	
Natsuki Sasahara	Hyper Police	Half-human half-nekomata who was born to a cat-demon mother and a normal human father.	
Schrödinger (Hellsing)	Hellsing	Resembling a young, teenage blond boy in a Hitler Youth uniform with cat ears and a perpetual smirk, Schrödinger shares The Major's love for war and bloodshed while serving mainly as his envoy for Millennium.	
Kyo Soma	Fruits Basket	He is cursed by the cat, an animal not in the Chinese zodiac, but which legend says would have been if it had not been tricked by the Rat into missing the induction feast.	
Sailor Tin Nyanko	Sailor Moon	The Materials Collection states she has several cat traits including her eyes, her nine lives, mouth, etc.	
Koneko Toujou/Shirone	High School DxD	A white-haired two-tailed humanoid nekomata raised by a devil, Shirone (白音) has to witness her master being killed in self-defense at the hands of Kuroka, who becomes a stray devil.	
Yoru	Shugo Chara!	The cat-like guardian of Ikuto Tsukiyomi, who represents his desire for freedom.	
Yoruichi Shihōin	Bleach	A woman with the ability to transform into a black cat. Her cat form gives her a deep voice, which leads many characters to initially believe she is male.	

== In animation ==
Character(s)	Origin	Notes	Ref.
Blake Belladonna	RWBY	A character of the Faunus race and a huntress who attends Beacon Academy. She later becomes Yang Xiao Long's girlfriend in the ninth volume of RWBY	
Catra	She-Ra: Princess of Power	A Force-Captain of Hordak's Evil Horde who has minor sorcery abilities. She wields a magical mask which gives the ability to transform into a purple panther-like creature and telepathically command other felines.	
Catra	She-Ra and the Princesses of Power	A Force-Captain of Hordak's Evil Horde who possesses cat-like features, including a tail, large furry ears, a mane, and claws. She is a more complex figure than the original series, serving as an antagonist before ultimately redeeming herself and becoming Adora's girlfriend.	
Kit	Gameoverse	The series protagonist whose home world was destroyed when she won her game. She travels between game worlds trying to stop the hero from beating the game to save the residents from destruction.	
M'Ress	Star Trek: The Animated Series	A Caitian communications officer who serves on the USS Enterprise under command of James T. Kirk.	
Olive	High Guardian Spice	A catgirl working for the Triumvirate and a skilled assassin, with a cat friend named Kino. She later helps the protagonists fight Mandrake. She is based on the series creator's cat of the same name, as is her cat friend.	
Ortensia the Cat	Mickey Mouse universe	Girlfriend of Oswald the Lucky Rabbit, appearing in the Oswald shorts starting with "The Banker's Daughter" (1927), replacing Oswald's former love interest, a much more feminine and sultry rabbit named Fanny in production materials.	
Sword Brave	Brave Animated Series	A swordswoman catgirl brave who fights using a katana.	
T'Ana	Star Trek: Lower Decks	A Caitian doctor and head of medical team aboard the USS Cerritos.	
ThunderCats	ThunderCats franchise	An alien race of feline humanoids, including Lion-O, Panthro, Cheetara, Tygra, and Snarf.	

== In literature and comics ==
Character(s)	Origin	Notes	Ref.
C'Mell	"The Ballad of Lost C'Mell"	A woman created from cat DNA.	
Catreece	Reality Check!	A cat who takes the form of a catgirl when she is connected to the virtual reality VIS.	
Catwoman	DC Comics	A villain who dresses in a cat-suit and is recognized as a catgirl.	
Cheetah	DC Comics	The name of several villains who are enemies of Wonder Woman. The first two Cheetahs, Priscilla Rich and Deborah Domaine, wear cat-themed suits, while the third and fourth Cheetahs, Barbara Minerva and Sebastian Ballesteros, are mystically empowered werecats.	
Kitrina Falcone	DC Comics	The main DC universe Catgirl and a protégée of Catwoman.	
Carrie Kelley	DC Comics	Superheroine who also adopts the Catgirl moniker.	
Nepeta Leijon	Homestuck	A troll who likes cat-related lusii and enjoys roleplaying, dressing, having her typing quirk and strife specibus like so, without mentioning her horns and mouth being shaped to resemble as those of a cat.	
Nyara	Mercedes Lackey's Valdemar book series	A human who was transformed into a catgirl by her father's magical experiments	
Pandora	Pandora's Tale	She is a trans woman who imprinted on Isabelle Monday, another trans woman who became her mentor and guardian.	
Pururin	Welcome to the N.H.K.	A catgirl named Puru Puru Pururin, a show-within-a-show in the novel.	
Tigra	Marvel Comics	A feline hero with superpowers and a variety of gadgets. Initially a human, Tigra was given the ability to transform into a humanoid cat by the Cat People, a mystical cat-like species.	
(Unnamed)	Venus and the Cat	An ancient story famously reflected Jean de La Fontaine's fable "The cat changed into a woman", has a catgirl protagonist. She is usually a cat turned into a normal-looking woman but retaining feline characteristics.	

== In film ==
Character(s)	Origin	Notes	Ref.
Baron Humbert von Gikkingen	The Cat Returns	A cat figure who originally appeared in Whisper of the Heart, where he was a fictional character created by Shizuku Tsukishima. Given life by the work of his artist, the Baron travels to the Cat Kingdom with Haru Yoshioka.	
Kitty	Monkeybone	Played by Rose McGowan, she is a catgirl waitress who protagonist Stuart "Stu" Miley befriends.	
Tigris Snow	The Hunger Games film series	Appearing throughout the Hunger Games franchise, including in the books Mockingjay and The Ballad of Songbirds and Snakes, she is a former Hunger Games stylist who works in a small shop specializing in fur-trimmed underwear. Her face has been altered into a "semi-feline mask" through many surgical operations.	

== In live-action television series ==
Character(s)	Origin	Notes	Ref.
The Cat	Red Dwarf	A descendant of Dave Lister's pregnant pet house cat Frankenstein, whose descendants evolved into a humanoid form over three million years while Lister was in stasis (suspended animation). He is vain and aloof, and loves to dress in extravagant clothing. He is simply referred to as "Cat" in lieu of not having a real name.	
Alek Petrov	The Nine Lives of Chloe King	One of the descendants of the Mai race and Jasmine's cousin who reveals himself to Chloe to protect her.	
Jasmine	The Nine Lives of Chloe King	One of the descendants of the Mai race who seeks to protect Chloe, the savior of their race.	
Chloe King	The Nine Lives of Chloe King	Part of the Mai, an ancient cat-like race descended from Bast, believed to be the savior of the Mai race, with extra abilities and the gift of nine lives, making her a warrior in a prophecy that states that she must save the world and both the Mai and Human races, and stop their war.	
Dr. Katherine "Kat" Manx	Power Rangers S.P.D.	Played by Michelle Langstone, she is a feline alien, close friend of Doggie Cruger, and S.P.D.'s chief technologist.	
Valentina	The Nine Lives of Chloe King	Jasmine's mother, and the leader of all the Mai in San Francisco.	

== In video games ==
Character(s)	Origin	Notes	Ref.
Chen	Touhou Project series	(debuted in Touhou Youyoumu〜Perfect Cherry Blossom) A nekomata who is the shikigami of kitsune Ran Yakumo. She is able to use sorcery when possessed as a shikigami.	
Cipher	Honkai Star Rail	A cat-girl character from Amphoreus, a Chrysos Heir representing the titan of Trickery.	
Diona	Genshin Impact	A Kätzlein bartender who works at the Cat's Tail.	
Felicia	Darkstalkers franchise	Also known as Ferishia, Felicia dreams of being a famous singer and dancer in Las Vegas. She eventually runs an orphanage, as a nun.	
Gormotti	Xenoblade series	A species from the Titan Gormott who resemble humans with cat ears. Two of the series' playable characters — Nia in Xenoblade Chronicles 2 and Mio in Xenoblade Chronicles 3 — are Gormotti.	
Mike Goutokuji	Touhou Project series	(debuted in Touhou Kouryuudou〜Unconnected Marketeers) A maneki-neko originating from the Outside World. She intended to train to become a maneki-neko of Gōtoku-ji in Tokyo, but she was bullied and chased out of the temple by other trainees due to her calico fur. She found refuge in Gensōkyō, but due to her incomplete training, she is only able to invite either money or people for business, often driving away the other.	
Ms. Fortune	Skullgirls	Ms. Nadia fortune is a feline Feral who belonged to the Fishbone Gang, she was rendered undying when she swallowed the Life Gem she stole. She also has the ability to remove her head and limbs at whim.	
Rin Kaenbyou (Orin)	Touhou Project series	(debuted in Touhou Chireiden〜Subterranean Animism) A kasha who is tasked with carrying away corpses to be used as fuel for the Remains of Blazing Hell, where she resides under her master Satori Komeiji's (satori) Palace of Earth Spirits. She is able to communicate with and control spirits, including by means of reanimating corpses. She can shift between a cat form and a humanoid form. More commonly known as Orin.	
Kirara	Genshin Impact	A two-tailed nekomata who works as a courier at Komaniya Express.	
Miqo'te	Final Fantasy XIV	They are a race with bestial traits, but can be male or female, unlike the Mithra race.	
Mithra	Final Fantasy XI	A race of hunters who live alongside the Tarutaru in Windurst and known for their energy, curiosity, and their penchant for causing playful mischief. Due to a gender imbalance in their race males are a rarity, and so only female mithra leave the home, making females the only playable gender.	
Niko	OneShot	The protagonist of the puzzle-adventure game OneShot. Often described as a 'cat-child', Niko possesses distinct feline traits, including glowing yellow eyes with slit pupils and a hat resembling cat ears, despite their repeated denials of being a cat.	

== See also ==
- List of fictional felines
