= Hacıman =

Hajiman
- Azerbaijani: Hacıman
- Location within Azerbaijan
- Coordinates: 40°44′N 48°30′E
- Country: Azerbaijan
- District: Agsu
- Municipality: Dilman
- Time zone: UTC+4 (AZT)
  - Summer (DST): UTC+5 (AZT)

Hacıman (also, Hajiman) is a village in the Agsu District of Azerbaijan. The village forms part of the municipality of Dilman.
