= Kentaro Hashimoto =

Japanese baseball player (born 1980)

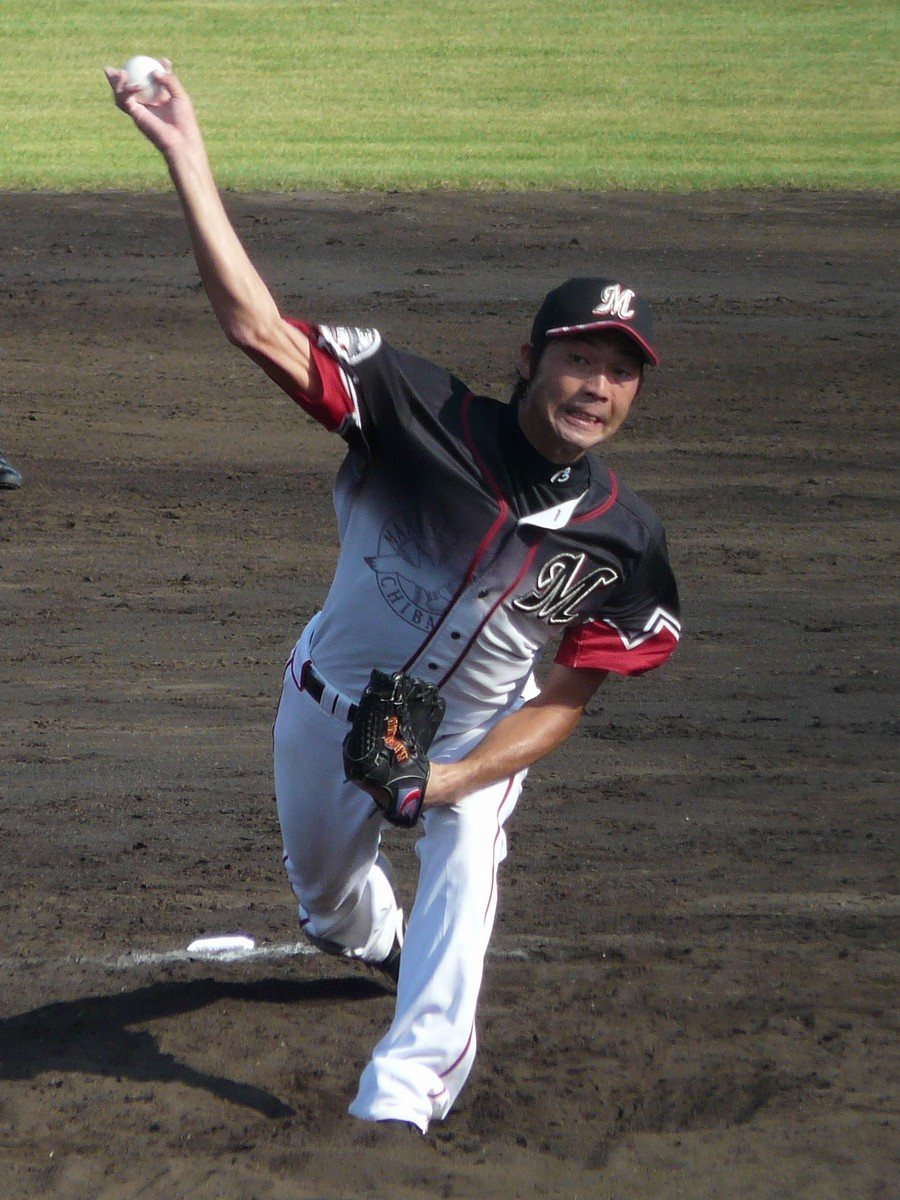
- Pitcher
- Born: April 28, 1980 (age 45); Yao, Osaka
- Bats: Right Throws: Right

debut
- 2005, for the Hanshin Tigers

Career statistics (through 2012 season)
- WHIP: 1.400
- ERA: 4.20
- SO: 12

Teams
- Hanshin Tigers (2005–2008); Chiba Lotte Marines (2009–2010, 2012).

Kentaro Hashimoto (橋本 健太郎, Hashimoto Kentarō; born April 28, 1980) is a Japanese professional baseball pitcher. He was born in Yao, Osaka. He is currently playing for the Chiba Lotte Marines of the NPB.
