= Xatman =

- Location within Azerbaijan
- Coordinates: 40°44′N 48°29′E
- Country: Azerbaijan
- Rayon: Agsu
- Municipality: Dilman
- Time zone: UTC+4 (AZT)
  - Summer (DST): UTC+5 (AZT)

Xatman (also, Khatman) is a village in the Agsu Rayon of Azerbaijan. The village forms part of the municipality of Dilman.
