= Hombre Gato =

Legendary creature

The Hombre Gato, or Catman, is a legendary creature that possesses both feline and human features. This South American folk tale is particularly popular in Argentina, especially in rural and less populated areas.

Much like the werewolf, the catman is thought to come out at night, roaming neighborhoods and preying on both people and animals. There are those who believe in his existence, claiming to have heard or even encountered him, but the majority of people who relate this story describe it as fictional.

The Hombre Gato has also made its way into Hispanic literature, becoming the subject of many short stories and science fiction tales. There is also a documentary (La Leyenda del Hombre Gato) made in Navarro, a rural town of Buenos Aires.

== See also ==
- Werecat
