= Skat =

Skat may refer to:

== Organisations ==
- SKAT (tax agency), the Danish tax authority
- SKAT (television) (Bulgarian: Национална телевизия Скат), a Bulgarian national cable television company, with the channels Skat and Skat+
- Skat media (Russian: Скат медиа), a Russian independent online media; see Vesna (Russia)
- Surya Kiran Aerobatic Team, an aerobatics display team of the Indian Air Force.
- Savanoriškoji krašto apsaugos tarnyba, former name of the Lithuanian National Defence Volunteer Forces

== Transport ==
- Skat (yacht), a luxury yacht launched in 2001
- Skagit Transit, a bus system in Skagit County, Washington
- Mikoyan Skat, a Russian unmanned combat air vehicle (UCAV)

== Card games ==
- Skat (card game), Germany's national card game
- Skat (cards), a stack of undealt cards used during game play

== Other uses ==
- Skat (river), a river in Bulgaria
- Skat (song), a song by Canadian singer Tory Lanez
- Skat, the IAU-approved proper name for the star Delta Aquarii

== See also ==
- Scat (disambiguation)
