= Scat =

Scat or SCAT may refer to:

== Education ==
- School and College Ability Test also known as SCAT
- Shrewsbury College of Arts & Technology was previously referred to as SCAT
- Somerset College of Arts and Technology is referred to as SCAT

== Games ==
- Skat (card game), Germany's national card game, historically known as Scat
- Scat, a card game also known as Thirty-One
- Scat (cards), a packet of cards dealt to the table which may be exchanged with
- S.C.A.T.: Special Cybernetic Attack Team, a video game for the Nintendo Entertainment System by Natsume

== Music ==
- Scat singing, a kind of vocal improvisation common in jazz
- Scat Records, a record label
- Scatman John, a singer
- Scatman Crothers, U.S. musician and actor

== Transportation ==
- SCAT Airlines, an airline based in Kazakhstan
- SCAT (automobile) an Italian automobile manufacturer
- Sarasota County Area Transit, a public transportation system in Florida
- Seoul Station City Airport Terminal, a city airport terminal at Seoul Station, Seoul for Incheon International Airport
- South Coast Area Transit, a public transportation system in California
- South Pacific Combat Air Transport Command, a joint command of U.S. forces in World War II
- Space Coast Area Transit, a public transportation system in Florida
- Suffolk County Accessible Transportation, a paratransit service of Suffolk County Transit, Suffolk County, New York
- Sydney Coordinated Adaptive Traffic System, a traffic network operating system in Australia

== Other ==
- Scat is an alternate term for feces, particularly of wild carnivores
  - Scatophilia, a sexual paraphilia involving feces
- Scanning Acoustic Tomography, a research process using focused sound
- Somerville Community Access Television, a local television station in Somerville, Massachusetts
- Special Crimes Action Team, a fictional California state police task force in BJ and the Bear
- Scat (novel), a novel for young adults written by Carl Hiaasen
- Social Change Assistance Trust, a South African non-profit organisation.
- SHARE Compiler-Assembler-Translator, early assembler for IBM 700/7000 series computers

== See also ==
- Skat (disambiguation)
