= Strange Catman =

Japanese and Australian Internet personality

Kentaro Jin
- Born: 1998 or 1999 (age 26–27); Japan
- Other name: Strange Catman
- Occupation: Construction worker
- Known for: Walking from Carnarvon, Western Australia to Sydney

Kentaro Jin (born 1998 or 1999), known online as Strange Catman, is an Internet personality who is walking from the west coast to the east coast of Australia. Jin's walk comprised about 6,400 kilometres (4,000 mi).

Jin is walking to raise money for childhood cancer charities and wants to spread happiness.

On Instagram, Jin has more than 850,000 followers.

Prior to embarking on his walk across Australia, Jin was a construction worker in Japan.

== Journey ==
Jin has walked from Carnarvon, Western Australia since November 2023. His aim was to experience a unique view of Australia. His ultimate goal was to reach Sydney. He achieved his goal of walking to the Sydney Opera House on 14 March 2026. He walked for 10 kilometres each day.

The reason for Jin embarking on this long walk is because he broke up with his girlfriend in Japan, from which he initially felt despair but decided to embark on this long-held dream.

Jin chose the name "Catman" because of his previous farming job's requirement to use a wheelbarrow and the Japanese name for wheelbarrow being literally translated to "cat car". He was inspired by cross-country YouTubers such as Joe Bloggs and has cited a desire to do something not many people do.

Jin has taken breaks from walking to work jobs at a fish and chip store in Albany, Western Australia, as a construction worker in Perth and as a car washer in Esperance, Western Australia.

Over his journey, Jin raised more than $50,000 for childhood cancer research. On video, he always used a cat mask and costume.
