= Bakeneko =

Type of Japanese yōkai

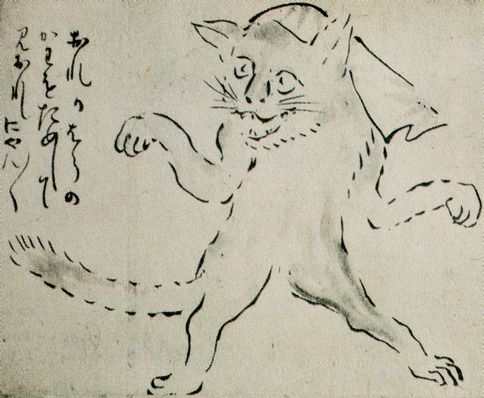
The Bakeneko of the Sasakibara Family (猫) from the Buson Yōkai Emaki by Yosa Buson. It depicts a cat in Nagoya that would wear a napkin on its head and dance. Unlike nekomata which have two tails, the bakeneko has only one tail.

The bakeneko (ばけ猫, "changed cat") is a type of Japanese yōkai, or supernatural entity; more specifically, it is a kaibyō, or supernatural cat. It is often confused with the nekomata, another cat-like yōkai. The distinction between them is often ambiguous, but the largest difference is that the nekomata has two tails, while the bakeneko has only one.

There are legends of bakeneko in various parts of Japan, but the tale of the Nabeshima Bakeneko Disturbance in Saga Prefecture is especially famous.

== Origin ==
The reason that cats are seen as yōkai in Japanese mythology is attributed to many of their characteristics: for example, the pupils of their eyes change shape depending on the time of day, their fur can seem to cause sparks when they are petted (due to static electricity), they sometimes lick blood, they can walk without making a sound, their wild nature that remains despite the gentleness they can show, they are difficult to control, their sharp claws and teeth, nocturnal habits, and their speed and agility.

Many other animals appear as yōkai in old tales and display similar attributes: the deep tenacity of snakes, the ability of foxes (kitsune) to shapeshift into women, and the brutality of bake-danuki in eating humans depicted in the Kachi-kachi Yama folktale from the Edo period. However, cats figure in a great number of tales and superstitions because they live with humans yet retain their wild essence and air of mystery.

One folk belief about the bakeneko is that they lick lamp oil. In the Edo period encyclopedia Wakan Sansai Zue, it is said that a cat licking this oil is an omen of an impending strange event. People in the early modern period used cheap fish oils in lamps, e.g. sardine oil; that could explain cats wanting to lick them. Also, at that time the Japanese diet was based on grains and vegetables, and while the leftovers were fed to the cats, as carnivores, the cats would have lacked for protein and fat and therefore been even more attracted to lamp oils. Moreover, the sight of a cat standing on its hind legs to reach a lamp, its face lit with anticipation, could have seemed eerie and unnatural, like a yōkai. The stealing of household objects is commonly associated with many Japanese ghosts, and thus the disappearance of lamp oil when a cat was present helped to associate the cat with the supernatural.

The mysterious air that cats possess was associated with prostitutes who worked in Edo-period red-light districts. This was the origin of a popular character in kusazōshi (among other publications), the bakeneko yūjo.

== Folk legends ==
As with the nekomata, another cat-like yōkai which is said to evolve from a cat whose tail split into two when it grew old, there are folk beliefs across Japan about aged cats turning into bakeneko. There are tales of cats that became bakeneko after being raised for twelve years in Ibaraki Prefecture and Nagano Prefecture, and for thirteen years in Kunigami District, Okinawa Prefecture. In Yamagata District, Hiroshima Prefecture, it is said that a cat raised for seven years or longer will kill the one that raised it. There are also many regions where, due to this superstition, people decided in advance for how many years they would raise a cat. Depending on the area, there are stories in which cats that were brutally killed by humans would become bakeneko and curse that human. Bakeneko stories are not only about aged cats, but also sometimes about revenge against cruel humans.

The abilities attributed to bakeneko are various, including shapeshifting into humans, wearing a towel or napkin on the head and dancing, speaking human words, cursing humans, manipulating dead people, possessing humans, and lurking in the mountains and taking wolves with them to attack travelers. As an unusual example, on Aji island, Oshika District, Miyagi Prefecture and in the Oki Islands, Shimane Prefecture, there is a story of a cat that shapeshifted into a human and wanted to engage in sumo.

The legend that cats could speak may have arisen from misinterpreting the cat's meowing as human language; for this reason some would say that the cat is not a type of yōkai. In 1992 (Heisei 4), in the Yomiuri newspaper, there was an article that argued that when people thought they had heard a cat speak, upon listening a second time, they realized that it was simply the cat's meowing and that it was only coincidence that it resembled a human word.

In the Edo period (1603–1867), there was a folk belief that cats with long tails like snakes could bewitch people. Cats with long tails were disliked, and there was a custom of cutting their tails. It is speculated that this is the reason that there are so many cats in Japan with short tails now, natural selection having favored those with short tails.

Folk beliefs that cats can cause strange phenomena are not limited to Japan. For example, in Jinhua, Zhejiang, in China, it is said that a cat that had been raised by humans for three years would start bewitching them. Because cats with white tails are said to be especially good at this, refraining from raising them became customary. Since their ability to bewitch humans is said to come from taking in the spiritual energy of the Moon, it is said that when a cat looks up at the Moon, it should be killed on the spot, whether its tail has been cut or not.

=== The tale of Takasu Genbei ===
One famous bakeneko story is about a man named Takasu Genbei, whose mother's personality changed completely after his pet cat went missing for many years. His mother avoided the company of friends and family and would take her meals alone in her room. When the family peeked in on her, they saw a cat-like monster in the mother's clothes, chewing on animal carcasses. Takasu, still skeptical, slew what looked like his mother, and after one day his mother's body turned back into his pet cat that had been missing. Takasu then tore up the floorboards of his mother's room to find her skeleton hidden there, her bones gnawed clean of all flesh.

== Writings and literature ==
=== Nabeshima bakeneko disturbance ===
There is a bakeneko legend that takes place in the time of Nabeshima Mitsushige, the second daimyō of the Saga Domain, Hizen Province. Mitsushige's retainer Ryūzōji Matashichirō, who served as the daimyō's opponent in the game of Go, displeased Mitsushige and was put to the sword. Ryūzōji's mother, while recounting her sorrows to her cat, committed suicide. The cat licked the mother's blood, became a bakeneko, went into the castle, and tormented Mitsushige every night until his loyal retainer Komori Hanzaemon finally killed it and saved the Nabeshima family.

Historically, the Ryūzōji clan was older than the Nabeshima clan in Hizen. After Ryūzōji Takanobu's death, his assistant Nabeshima Naoshige held the real power, and after the sudden death of Takanobu's grandchild Takafusa, his father Masaie also committed suicide. Afterwards, since the remnants of the Ryūzōji clan created disturbances in the public order near the Saga castle, Naoshige, in order to pacify the spirits of the Ryūzōji, built Tenyū-ji (now in Tafuse, Saga). This has been considered the origin of the disturbance and it is thought that the bakeneko was an expression of the Ryūzōji's grudge in the form of a cat. Also, the inheritance of power from the Ryūzōji clan to the Nabeshima clan was not an issue, but because of Takanobu's death, and Nabeshima Katsushige's son's sudden death, some point out that this kaidan (ghost story) arose from a dramatization of this series of events.

This legend was turned into a shibai (play). In the Kaei period (1848–1854), it was first performed in Nakamura-za as Hana Sagano Nekoma Ishibumi Shi (花嵯峨野猫魔碑史). The "Sagano" in the title is a place in Tokyo Prefecture, but it was actually a pun on the word saga. This work became very popular throughout the country, but a complaint from the Saga domain brought the performances to a quick stop. However, since the machi-bugyō (a samurai official of the shogunate) who filed the complaint for the performances to be stopped was Nabeshima Naotaka of the Nabeshima clan, the gossip about the bakeneko disturbance spread even more.

After that, the tale was widely circulated in society in the kōdan Saga no Yozakura (佐賀の夜桜) and the historical record book Saga Kaibyōden (佐賀怪猫伝). In the kōdan (a style of traditional oral Japanese storytelling), because Ryūzōji's widow told of her sorrow to the cat, it became a bakeneko, and killed and ate Komori Hanzaemon's mother and wife. It then shapeshifted and appeared in their forms, and cast a curse upon the family. In the historical record book, this was completely unrelated to the Ryūzōji event, however, and a foreign type of cat, which had been abused by Nabeshima's feudal lord Komori Handayū, sought revenge and killed and ate the lord's favorite concubine, shapeshifted into her form, and caused harm to the family. It was Itō Sōda who exterminated it.

In the beginning of the Shōwa period (1926–1989), kaidan films such as Saga Kaibyōden (佐賀怪猫伝) and Kaidan Saga Yashiki (怪談佐賀屋敷) became quite popular. Actresses like Takako Irie and Sumiko Suzuki played the part of the bakeneko and became well known as "bakeneko actresses."

=== Other ===
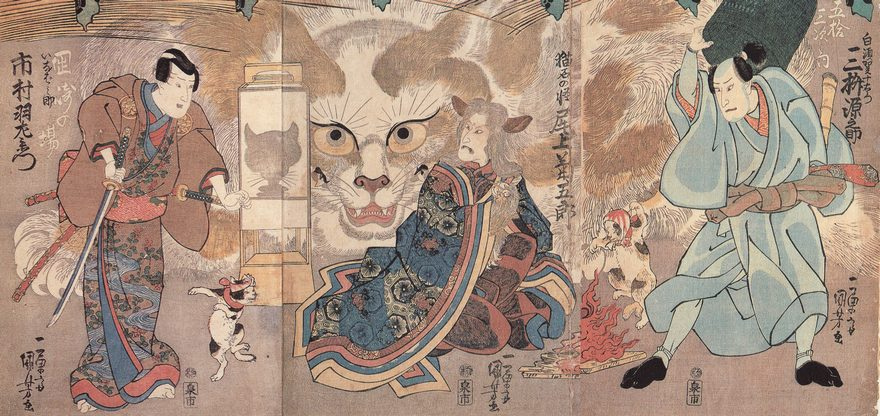
Ume no Haru Gojūsantsugi (駅) by Utagawa Kuniyoshi. A kabuki play that was performed in 1835 (Tenpo 6) in Ichimura-za. It depicts a cat that has shapeshifted into an old woman, a cat wearing a napkin and dancing, and the shadow of a cat licking a lamp.

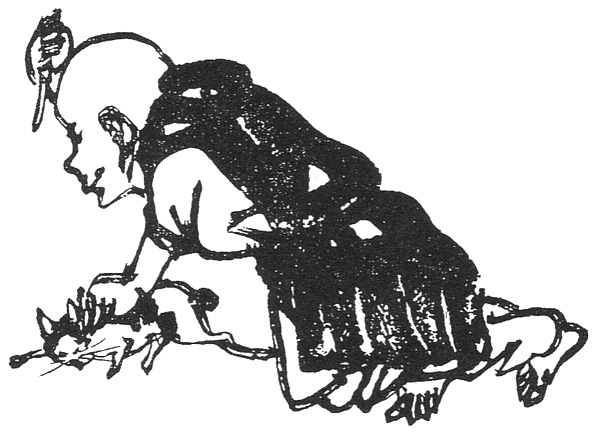
"Shōzan Chomon Kishū" by Miyoshi Shōzan. Here, a man who has become suspicious of a cat attempts to kill it because it speaks in human language.

Cats as yōkai in literature date back to the Kamakura period (1185–1333). In the collection of setsuwa (oral tradition of folktales before the 14th century), the Kokon Chomonjū, from this period, there can be seen statements pointing out cats that do strange and suspicious things, noting that "these are perhaps ones that have turned into demons." Old stories about bakeneko from that time period are often associated with temples, but it is thought that the reason for this is that when Buddhism came to Japan, in order to protect the sutras (sacred texts) from being chewed on by rats, cats were brought along too.

During the Edo period (1603–1867), tales about bakeneko began to appear in essays and kaidan collections in various areas. Tales of cats transforming into humans and talking can be seen in publications like the Tōen Shosetsu (兎園小説), the Mimibukuro (耳嚢), the Shin Chomonjū (新著聞集), and the Seiban Kaidan Jikki (西播怪談実記). Similarly, tales of dancing cats can be seen in the Kasshi Yawa (甲子夜話), and the Owari Ryōiki (尾張霊異記). In the fourth volume of "Mimibukuro", it is stated that any cat anywhere that lives for ten years would begin to speak as a human, and that cats born from the union of a fox and a cat would begin speaking even before ten years had passed. According to tales of cats that transform, aged cats would very often shapeshift into old women. The Edo period was the golden age for kaidan about bakeneko, and with shibai like the "Nabeshima Bakeneko Disturbance" being performed, these became even more famous.

In Makidani, Yamasaki, Shisō District, Harima Province (now within Shisō, Hyōgo Prefecture), a tale was passed down about a person in Karakawa who was a bakeneko. The same kind of tale was also found in Taniguchi, Fukusaki village, Jinsai District, of the same province, where it is said that in Kongōjō-ji, a bakeneko who troubled a villager was killed by someone from the temple. This bakeneko was protected from arrows and bullets by a chagama's lid and an iron pot. These, like the legend of Susanoo's extermination of Yamata no Orochi, have a commonality in that the local old families of the area played a role.

In 1909, articles about cats that broke into dance in tenement houses in the Honjo neighbourhood of Tokyo were published in newspapers such as the Sports Hochi, the Yorozu Chōhō, and the Yamato Shimbun.

== Landmarks ==
Myōtaratennyo – Yahiko-jinja, Niigata Prefecture
The origin of this landmark is in the Bunka period (1804–1818) essay Kidan Hokkoku Junjōki (記), which contains passages about strange events concerning cats. In this book, giving the character "猫" the reading "myō", it was written as "女". According to another tale in the setsuwa of the Hokuriku region, the tale of the yasaburo-baba or mountain witch, a cat killed and ate an old woman and then became that old woman in her place, but later had a change of heart and became worshipped as a deity, the Myōtaraten. In Hokkaido and the northern Ōu region among other places, similar tales are passed down throughout the country.

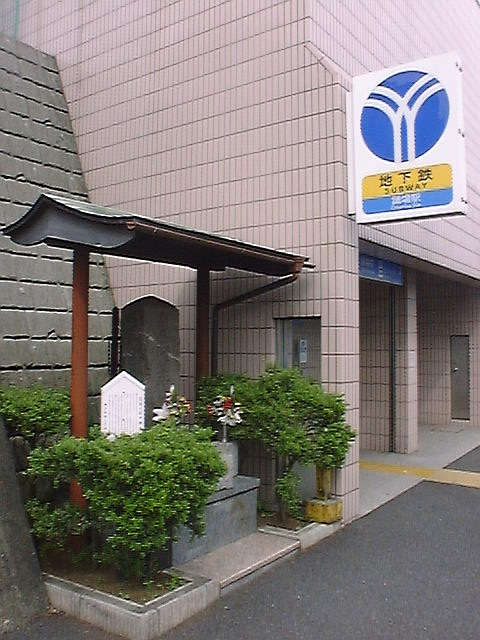
A stone monument Odoriba Station, Yokohama Municipal Subway engraving the origin of the station's name

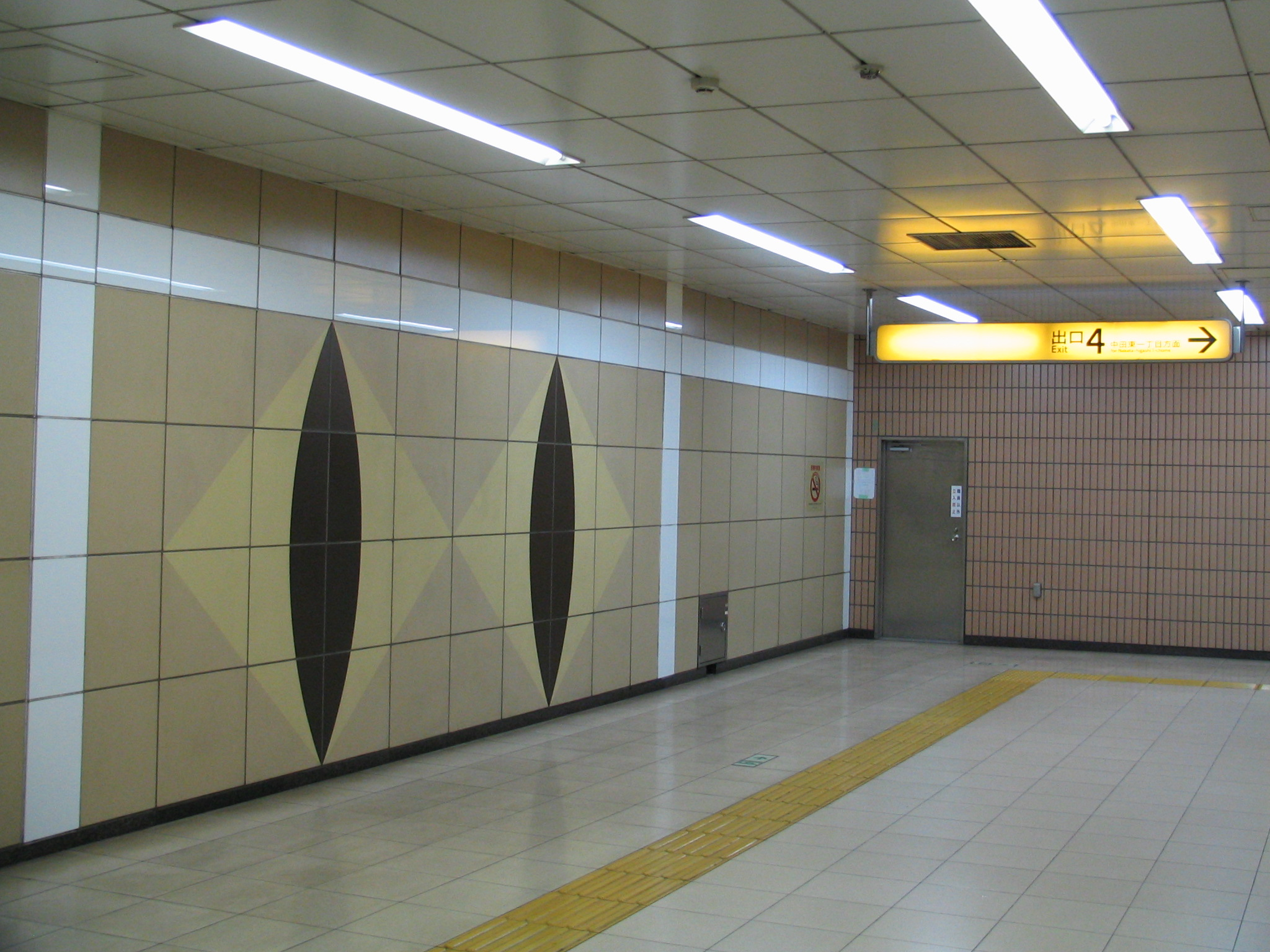
A monument in the entry passageway 4 of Odoriba station

Neko no Odoriba – Izumi-ku, Yokohama City, Kanagawa Prefecture
It is said that in a soy sauce shop long ago, in Totsuka-juku of the 53 Stations of the Tōkaidō (now Totsuka-ku, Yokohama, Kanagawa Prefecture), it sometimes happened that napkins would disappear in the night one by one. One night, when the proprietor of the soy sauce shop went out on a job, he heard some bustling music from a place where there should have been no people around. When he looked, there were several cats gathered, and there in the center was a strange sight: the shopkeeper's pet cat, wearing a napkin on its head and dancing. That explained why his napkins had been going missing.
The place where this cat is said to have danced is called Odoriba (踊場, meaning "dancing place"), and it left behind its name afterwards in places like the Odoriba intersection, as well as the Odoriba Station in the Yokohama Municipal Subway. In 1737 (Genbun 2), at the Odoriba intersection, a memorial tower was built in order to pacify the spirit of the cat, and the Odoriba station was decorated all over with the motif of a cat.
Omatsu Daigongen – Kamo Town, Anan, Tokushima Prefecture
This landmark derives from the following legend: In the early part of the Edo period, the village headman of Kamo Village (now Kamo Town) borrowed money from a wealthy man in order to save the village when their crops failed. Although he repaid the debt, the wealthy man plotted against him and falsely accused him of not paying. In despair, the village headman died of an illness. The land which had been collateral for the debt was then confiscated by the wealthy man. When the village headman's wife, Omatsu, attempted to complain to the bugyō (magistrate)'s office, the bugyō gave an unfair judgement because the wealthy person bribed him. Then, when Omatsu tried to complain directly to the daimyō, she failed again and was executed. The calico cat that Omatsu had raised became a bakeneko, and caused the wealthy person and the bugyō's families to come to ruin.
At Omatsu Daigongen lies the grave of Omatsu, where the loyal wife who put her life on the line for justice is deified. The calico cat that destroyed Omatsu's foes is also deified, as the "Neko-tsuka" ("cat mound"), and on the grounds there is a komainu (guardian statue) of a cat which is very unusual. Because the legend says that the cat sought revenge for an unfair judgement, it is supposed to grant favors in matters of competition or chance, and in testing season, many test-takers would pray for success in school here.
Neko Daimyōjin Shi – Shiroishi, Kishima District, Saga Prefecture
This is a landmark that comes from a tale concerning the Nabeshima clan, similar to the "Nabeshima Bakeneko Disturbance." In this story, the bakeneko took the shape of Nabeshima Katsushige's wife and sought Katsushige's life, but his retainer, Chibu Honuemon, slew it. However, after that the Chibu family was unable to produce a male heir because of the cat's curse. It is said that the bakeneko was deified at the shrine of Shūrinji (now Shiroishi Town) as a daimyōjin. At this shrine, a seven-tailed cat with its fangs bared has been engraved.
Historically, Hide Isemori of the Hide clan who once ruled Shiroishi, despite having befriended the Nabeshima clan, was suspected of being Christian, and was brought to ruin. Since the remnants of the Hide clan resented and fought against the Nabeshima clan at the Shūrinji, the secret maneuvers of one party of the Hide clan were compared to those of a bakeneko, and it is theorized that this became the prototype for the story of the "Nabeshima Bakeneko Disturbance."

=== In film ===
Bakeneko have appeared in Japanese films—including more specifically the subgenre of horror films known as "monster cat" or "ghost cat" films (kaibyō eiga or bake neko mono), a subgenre derived primarily from the repertoire of kabuki theatre. In such films, the bakeneko is often depicted as a vengeful spirit that manifests itself in the form of a cat-like woman.

== See also ==
- Kaibyō
- Maneki-neko
- Werecat
