= Nekomata =

Kind of cat monster in Japanese folklore

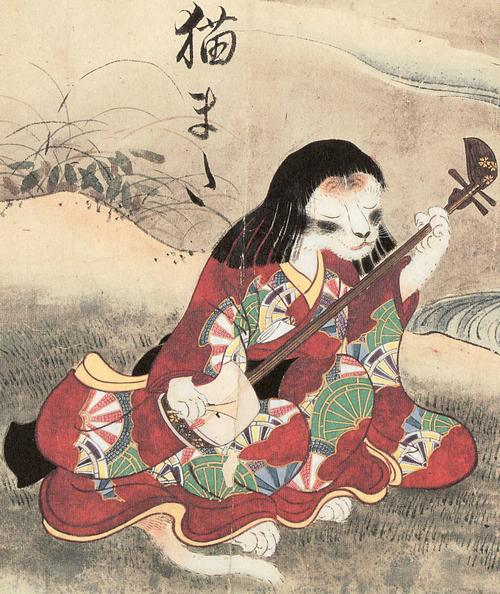
"Nekomata (猫また)" from the Hyakkai Zukan by Sawaki Suushi

Nekomata (original form: 猫また, later forms: 猫又, 猫股, 猫胯) are a kind of cat yōkai described in Japanese folklore, classical kaidan, essays, etc. There are two very different types: those that live in the mountains and domestic cats that have grown old and transformed into yōkai.

Nekomata are often confused with bakeneko. Nekomata have multiple tails, while bakeneko have one. Additionally, while bakeneko are often seen as mischievous and playful, nekomata are considered far more malicious in their behaviour.

== Mountain nekomata ==
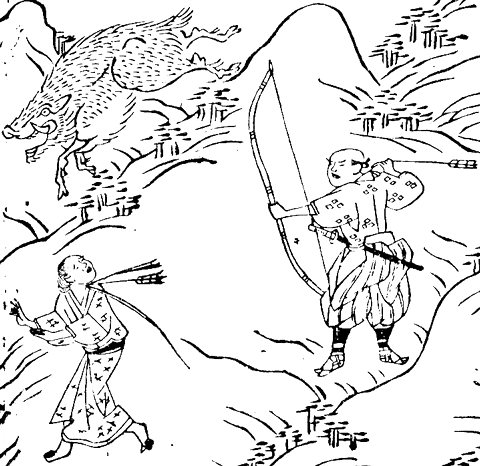
"Nekomata to Ifu Koto (ねこまたといふ事)" from the "Tonoigusa" by Ogita Ansei (1660). A scene of a hunter shooting a nekomata that has shapeshifted into the hunter's mother.

Nekomata appear in stories even earlier than in Japan. In the Sui dynasty, the words 猫鬼 and 金花猫 described mysterious cats. In Japanese literature, the nekomata first appeared in the Meigetsuki by Fujiwara no Teika in the early Kamakura period: in the beginning of Tenpuku (1233), August 2, in Nanto (now Nara Prefecture), a nekomata (猫胯) was said to have killed and eaten several people in one night. The nekomata was described as a mountain beast: according to the Meigetsuki, "They have eyes like a cat, and have a large body like a dog." An essay in Yoshida Kenkō 's 1331 Tsurezuregusa asserts, "In the mountain recesses, there are those called nekomata, and people say that they eat humans... (奥山に、猫またといふものありて、人を食ふなると人の言ひけるに……)."

Many people question whether the nekomata was originally a cat monster. Since people are said to suffer an illness called "nekomata disease" (猫跨病), some interpret the nekomata to be a beast that has caught rabies.

Even in the kaidan collections, the "Tonoigusa" (宿直草) and the "Sorori Monogatari" (曾呂利物語), nekomata conceal themselves in mountain recesses. There are stories that deep in the mountains they shapeshift into humans. In folk religion there are many stories of mountainous nekomata. In later literature, the mountain nekomata tend to be larger. In the "Shin Chomonjū" (新著聞集), nekomata captured in the mountains of Kii Province are as large as a wild boar; in the "Wakun no Shiori" (倭訓栞) of 1775 (Anei 4), their roar echoes throughout the mountain, and they can be seen as big as a lion or leopard. In the "Gūisō" (寓意草) of 1809 (Bunka 6), a nekomata that held a dog in its mouth was described as having a span of 9 shaku and 5 sun (about 2.8 meters).

At Mount Nekomata (猫又山, Nekomatayama) in Etchū Province (today Toyama Prefecture), nekomata were said to devour humans. Legends are sometimes named after their associated mountains, such as Mount Nekomadake. There are indeed large cats at Mount Nekomata that attack humans.

== Domestic cat nekomata ==
At the same time, in the setsuwa collection Kokon Chomonjū, in the story "Kankyō Hōin (観教法印)", an old cat raised in a villa on a mountain precipice held a secret treasure, a protective sword, in its mouth and ran away. People chased the cat, but it disguised itself. In the aforementioned Tsurezuregusa, aside from nekomata that conceal themselves in the mountains, there are descriptions of pet cats that grow old, transform, and eat and abduct people.

Since the Edo period, it has become generally believed that domestic cats turn into nekomata as they grow old, and mountainous nekomata have come to be interpreted as cats that have run away to live in the mountains. As a result, throughout Japan, a folk belief developed that cats should not be kept for long periods.

In the "Ansai Zuihitsu" (安斎随筆), the courtier Sadatake Ise stated, "A cat that is several years of age will come to have two tails, and become the yōkai called nekomata." The mid-Edo period scholar Arai Hakuseki stated, "Old cats become 'nekomata' and bewilder people." and indicated that at that time it was common to believe that cats become nekomata. Even the Edo-period Kawaraban reported this strange phenomenon.

In the book Yamato Kaiiki (大和怪異記, 'Mysterious stories from Japan'), written by an unknown author in 1708, one story speaks of a rich samurai's haunted house where the inhabitants witnessed several poltergeist activities. Attempting to end those events, the samurai called upon countless shamans, priests and evokers; but none of them could locate the source of the terror. One day, one of the most loyal servants saw his master's aged cat carrying in its mouth a shikigami with the samurai's name imprinted on it. Immediately shooting a sacred arrow, the servant hit the cat in its head; and as it lay dead on the floor, everyone could see that the cat had two tails and therefore had become a nekomata. With its death, the poltergeist activities ended. Similar eerie stories about encounters with nekomata appear in books such as Taihei Hyakumonogatari (太平百物語, 'Collection of one hundred fairy tales'), written by Yusuke (祐佐, also Yūsa) in 1723, and in Rōō Chabanashi (老媼茶話, 'Tea-time gossip of old ladies'), written by Misaka Daiyata (三坂大彌) in 1742.

It is generally said that the "mata" (又) of "nekomata" refers to their having two tails, but from the perspective of folkloristics, this appears questionable. Since nekomata transform as they age, mata "repetition" is postulated. Alternatively, since they were once thought to be mountain beasts, there is a theory that "mata" (爰) refers to monkeys since nekomata can come and go freely among the mountain trees. There is also a theory that the term derives from how cats that grow old shed the skin off their backs and hang downwards, making it appear that they have two tails.

In Japan, cats are often associated with death, and this particular spirit is usually blamed. Far darker and more malevolent than most bakeneko, the nekomata is said to have powers of necromancy and, upon raising the dead, will control them with ritualistic dances, gesturing with paw and tail. These yōkai are associated with strange fires and other inexplicable occurrences. The older and more abused a cat is before its transformation, the more power the nekomata is said to have. To gain revenge against those who wronged it, the spirit may haunt humans with visitations from their deceased relatives. Some tales state that these demons, like bakeneko, assume human appearances, usually appearing as older women, misbehaving in public, and bringing gloom and malevolence wherever they travel. Due to these beliefs, sometimes kittens' tails were cut off based on the assumption that if the tails could not fork, the cats could not become nekomata.

From this discernment and strange characteristics, nekomata have been considered devilish from time immemorial. Due to fears and folk beliefs such as the dead resurrecting at a funeral or that seven generations would be cursed due to killing a cat, it is thought that the legend of the nekomata was born. Also, in folk beliefs cats and the dead are related. As carnivores, cats have a keen sense of detecting the smell of rot, so it was believed that they had a habit of approaching corpses; with this folk belief sometimes the kasha, a yōkai that steals corpses are seen to be the same as the nekomata.

Also in Japan there are cat yōkai called bakeneko; and since nekomata are the yōkai of transformed cats, sometimes nekomata are confused with bakeneko.

== Yōkai depictions ==
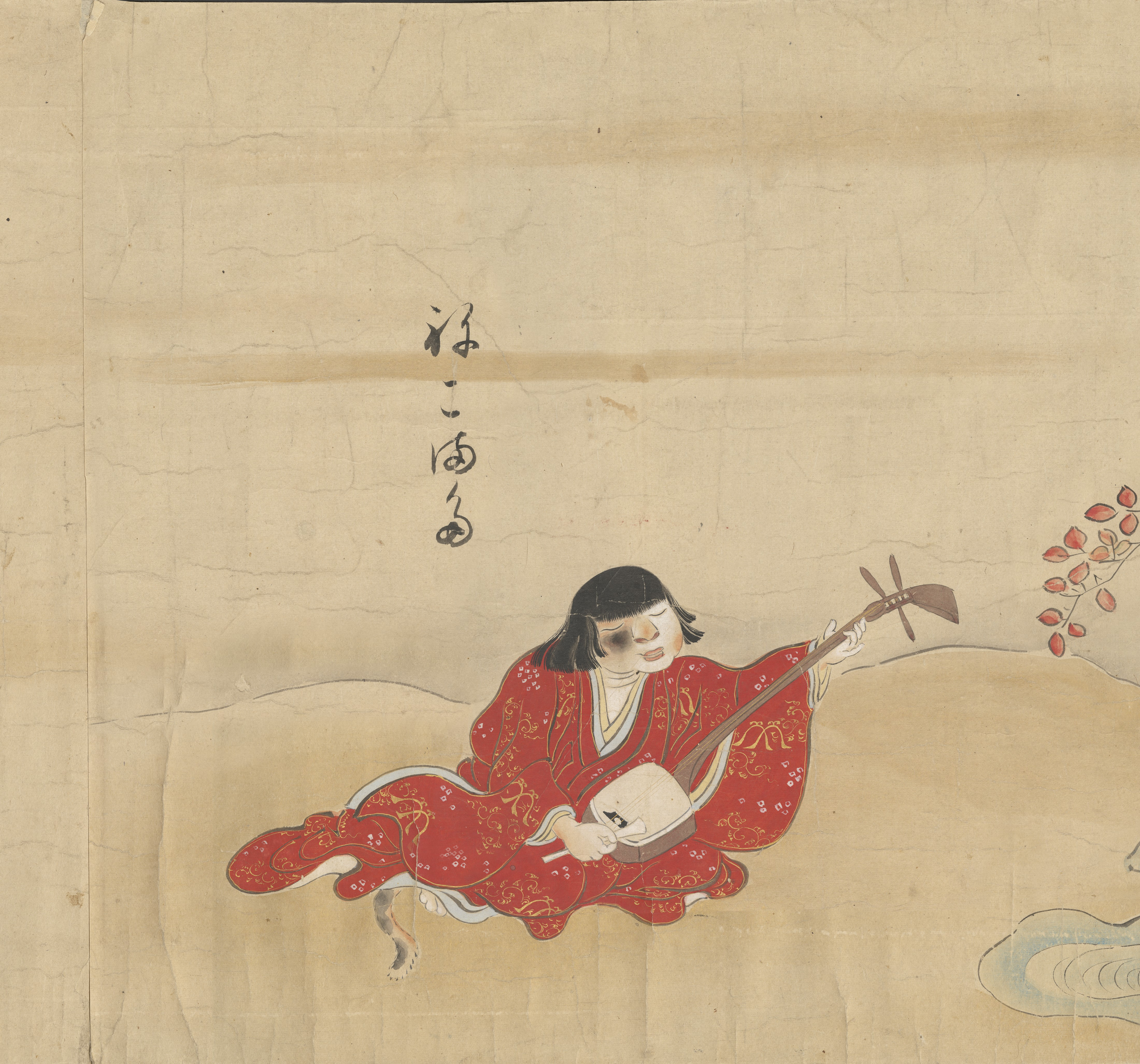
Nekomata (猫また) from Bakemono no e (化物之繪, c. 1700), Harry F. Bruning Collection of Japanese Books and Manuscripts, L. Tom Perry Special Collections, Harold B. Lee Library, Brigham Young University.

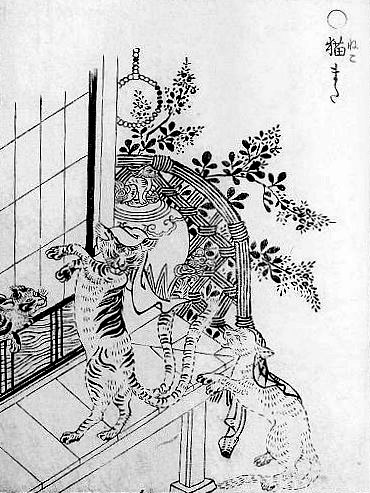
Nekomata (猫また) from the Gazu Hyakki Yagyō by Sekien Toriyama

In the Edo period many books illustrating and describing yōkai were published (yōkai emaki), with nekomata frequently depicted. The Hyakkai Zukan, published in 1737 (Genbun 2), includes an illustration of a nekomata assuming the appearance of a woman playing a shamisen, the first image on this page. Since Edo-period shamisen frequently used cat skins, that particular nekomata sang a sad song about its species as it plucked the strings. Understandably, the image has been interpreted as ironic. As for the nekomata's wearing geisha clothing, sometimes nekomata and geisha are considered related since geisha were once called "cats" (neko).

The Gazu Hyakki Yagyō of 1776 (An'ei 5) depicts a cat with its head protruding from a shōji screen, a cat with a handkerchief on its head and its forepaw on the veranda, and a cat wearing a handkerchief and standing upright, in the image to the right. The less experienced cat has difficulty standing on its hind legs. The older cat can do so: this is showing the process by which a normal cat ages and transforms into a nekomata. In the Bigelow ukiyo-e collection at the Museum of Fine Arts, Boston, the Hyakki Yagyō Emaki includes a similar composition, leading some scholars to see a relationship between the books.

== Senri ==
In Chinese lore, there is a cat monster called the xiānlí (仙狸, Japanese: senri; cf. Chinese 狸, 'leopard cat'). In this telling, leopard cats that grow old gain a xian (divine spiritual power), shapeshift into a beautiful man or woman, and suck the spirit out of humans. Some theorize that the Japanese nekomata legends derive from Chinese xiānlí tales.

== See also ==
- Kasha
- Kaibyō
- Kuroneko — a 1968 horror film featuring vengeful cat spirits
- Maneki-neko
