= Trolleybuses of Roma–Condesa =

Art projects in Mexico City

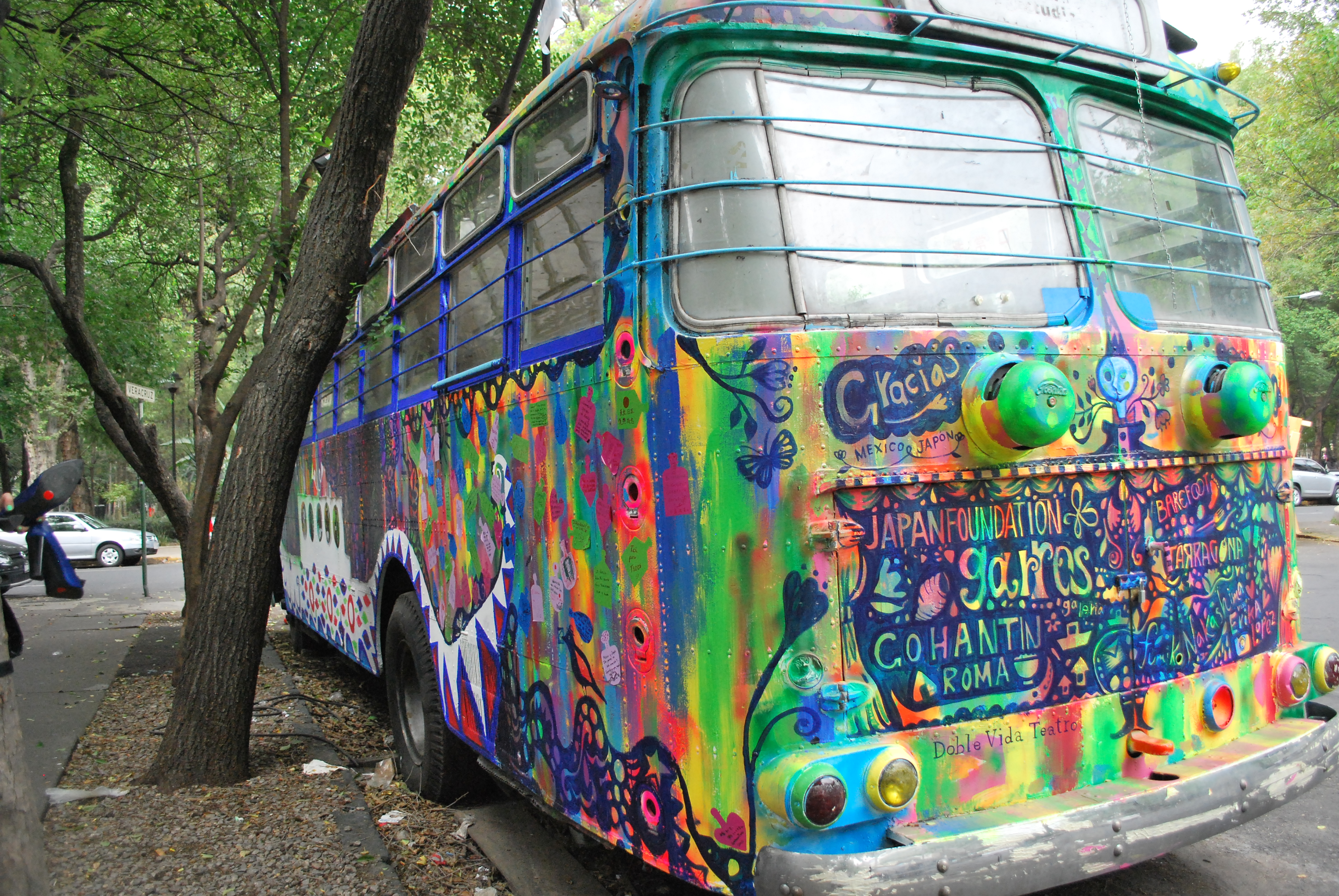
One of the buses painted by artist Fumiko Nakashima entitled Doble Vida.

The trolleybuses of Roma Condesa are permanently parked trolleybuses in the Roma and Condesa neighborhoods of Mexico City that were used for art and other projects. Most were Japanese buses that were donated to Servicio de Transportes Eléctricos by the Kansai Electric Power Company in Japan in 1994, for possible operation, which never came to fruition, and in 2000 they were repurposed by Cuauhtémoc borough in a programme to create educational centers. However, the Trolebuses Educativos programme lasted only a few months. Some of the trolleybuses remained in use as simple reading rooms, but others sat abandoned until 2005, when the “Galería Trolebús” (Trolleybus Gallery) was begun to promote non-traditional art projects. The gallery ceased operations in 2009 due to financial problems, but the buses continued to be used for art projects until about 2014. Two other trolleybuses involved were not Japanese vehicles.

== Origin ==
The three Japanese trolleybuses were part of a group of nine that were donated to Mexico's Servicio de Transportes Eléctricos in the mid-1990s, for possible use in service on the city's trolleybus system, and were transported to Mexico City between 1994 and 1997, but ultimately were never placed in service. The trolleybuses were built between 1964 and 1968 by Mitsubishi as Models 100 and 200 for the Kansai Denryoku company and operated on the Kanden Tunnel Trolleybus line. The two models are distinguished by the number of doors: one and two, respectively. All of the trolleybuses have doors only on their left sides (except for a small emergency exit door near the rear), because Japan is a country where traffic drives on the left, which made their configuration impractical for operation in Mexico City. In late 1994, STE rebuilt the first unit, No. 117, for right-hand traffic – with doors on the right and steering wheel on the left – but judged the conversion to be too expensive. No other vehicles were converted, and none of the nine ever entered service.

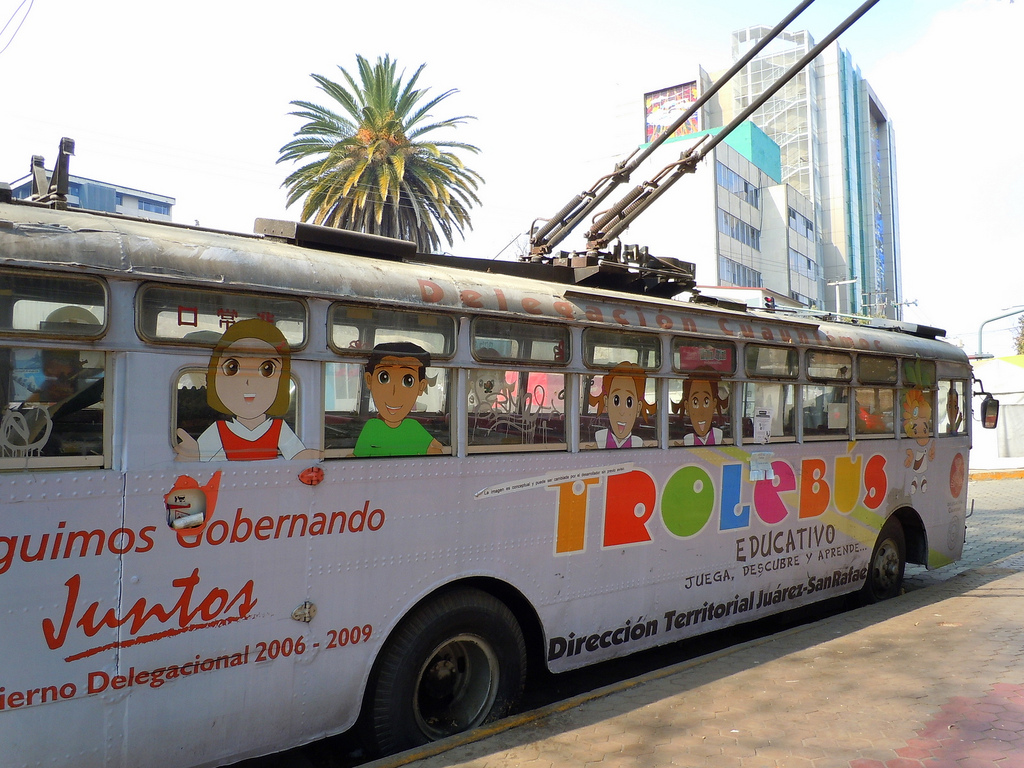
One of the trolleybuses when it was still painted for the "Trolebuses Educativos" programme, in 2011. This is the bus's right side, and the trolley poles have been swung around to point towards the front end.

In spring 2000, all were donated to Cuauhtémoc borough for use as children's educational centers and reading rooms placed near libraries, in a programme known as the “Trolebuses Educativos” programme. That programme ended after only three months, at the end of August 2000, and some of the trolleybuses were moved to storage, while others remained on the street, disused. (One, No. 118, returned to STE, but no longer operational.) Some were returned to use later as children's reading rooms, but others sat abandoned in various parts of Mexico City, mainly still in the Cuauhtémoc borough. In 2012, there were three that remained in use for art projects, one permanently parked in Colonia Hipódromo by Parque España, one in Colonia Roma next to Plaza Luis Cabrera and one next to Parque México in Colonia Condesa. When serving the Kanden Tunnel Trolleybus line, the buses travelled through a tunnel between Ogizawa and Kurobe Dam in the Toyama Prefecture, and the one now at Parque España has references to this history on the sign on its windshield. The Kanden Tunnel bus line still operates, but battery-powered buses replaced the trolleybuses in 2018–19.

The vehicles were donated to Cuauhtémoc in 2000. Initially they sat abandoned until the Galería Trolebús project.

== Galería Trolebús ==
From 2000 and 2005, the three buses sat abandoned until Ariadna Ramonetti discovered them and worked to create the Galería Trolebús (Trolleybus Gallery) in cooperation with the Cuauhtémoc borough to promote non-traditional art projects. Artists who worked with the vehicles from 2005 to 2009 included Karen Cordero, Ana Elena Mallet, Santiago Espinoza de los Monteros and Antonio Calera. Some of the art projects included light and sound.

In 2006, Montiel Klint inhabited the trolleybus at the north end of Plaza Luis Cabrera in Colonia Roma, blocked from view for two months with only eight photographs on the outside of the bus for visitors to see. The interior of the bus was covered with about 5,000 paper cups to isolate it from the outside. The work was called the Galeria Experimental de Arte (Experimental Gallery of Art). “Suspended Black” by Víctor Noxpango had one of the trolleybuses elevated on six hydraulic jacks and painted completely black. After artist Israel Meza Moreno created a work called Nido de Malvivientes in 2007 with one of the trolleybuses, the Fundación Jumex commissioned a similar work, which was bought by a private collector and later acquired by the Museum of Modern Art in New York. The work consisted of covering the interior of the trolleybus with cardboard pieces on which phrases from young thieves whom the artists had interviewed were written. The windows were covered with newspaper front pages with violent headlines. Alvaro Verduzco's work was called “Túnel” (Tunnel) in 2009, which used a cone made of cardboard with the bus to create the illusion of infinity.

The gallery ceased operations due to financial difficulties. The various projects that took place during that time drew both praise and criticism from the residents of the various neighborhoods. The art projects were best received in Colonia Roma and least in Colonia Condesa.

== Post-Galería ==
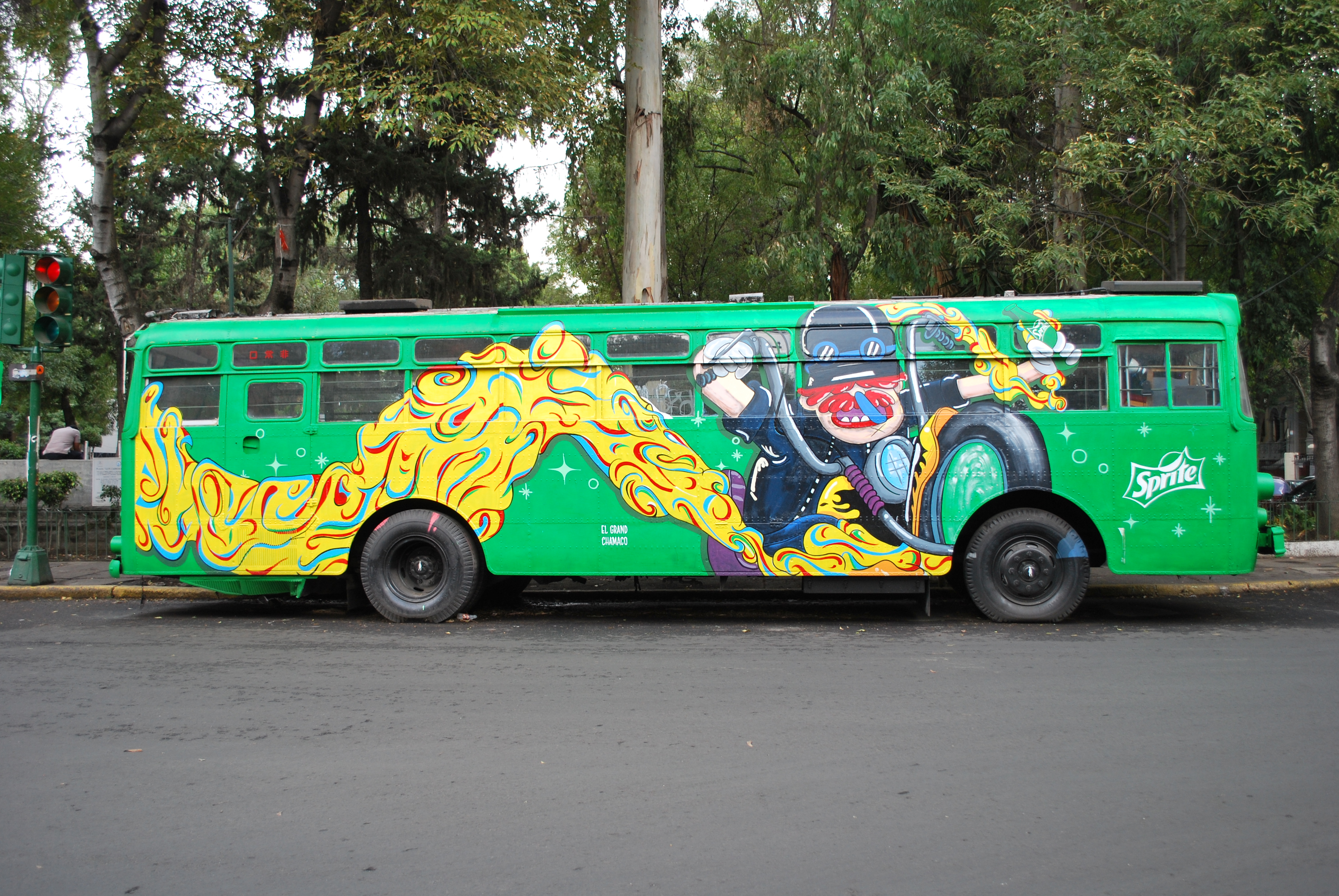
Japanese trolleybus at the north end of Plaza Luis Cabrera, in Colonia Roma, in 2012

After 2009, the three trolleybuses remained in their respective locations for some time. The borough government still allowed artists, community members and even advertisers to paint the buses periodically, painting over whatever was there previously. In February 2012, the trolleybus in Colonia Hipódromo was painted by Japanese artist Fumiko Nakashima with her work given the title of “Doble Vida” or “Double Life.” The work was to commemorate the one-year anniversary of the Japan earthquake and tsunami, along with a ceremony on March 11, 2012. The work was part of a public art program called Haru ga kita (Spring comes) en México under this artist along with musician Emiliano Isamu. It was sponsored by the Garros Galería in Mexico City, the Fundación Japón México and the Cuauhtémoc borough.

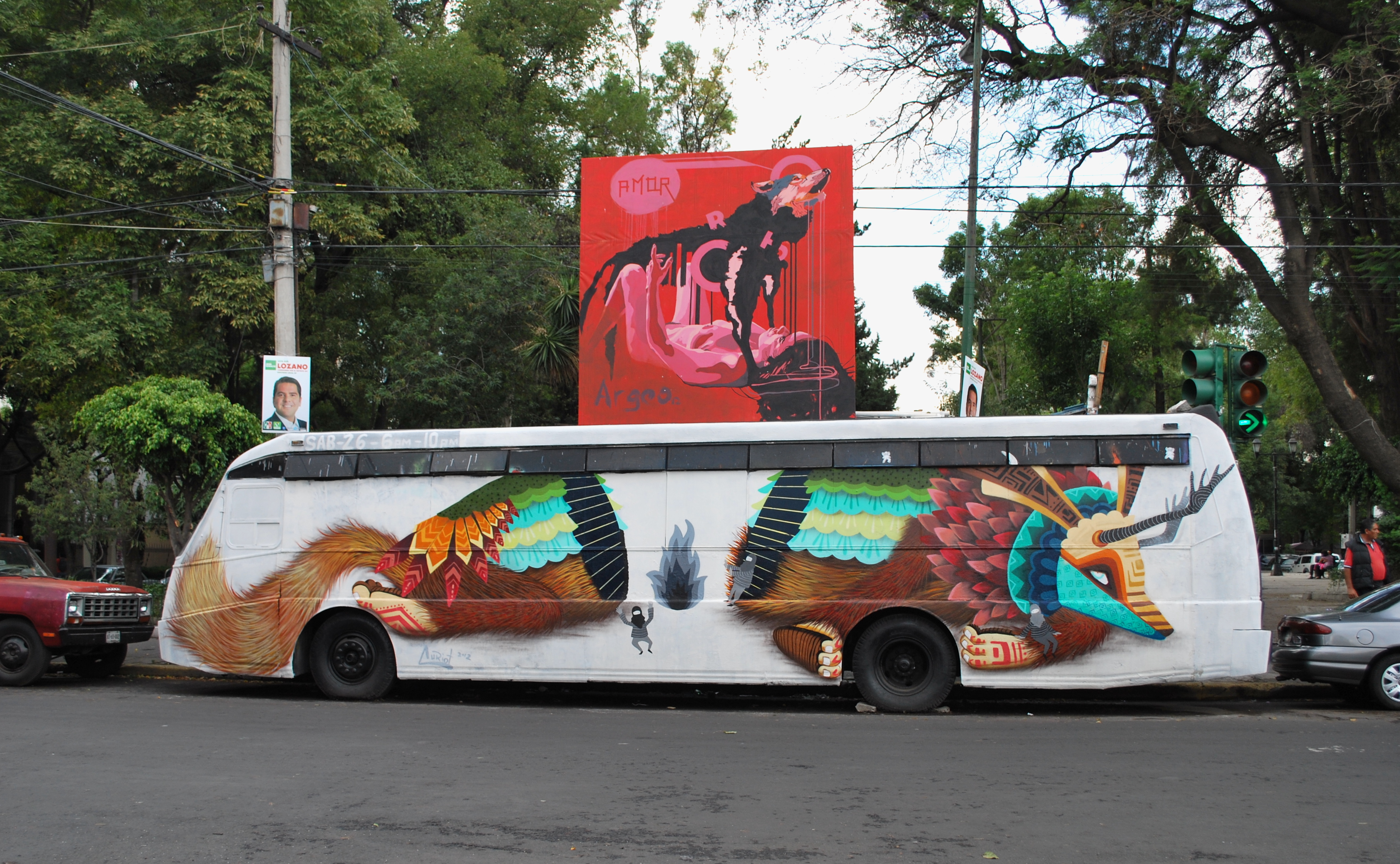
The TATSA-rebodied Marmon-Herrington trolleybus (former STE No. 5122), one of only two non-Japanese trolleybuses painted as public art, in 2012. It was at the south end of Plaza Luis Cabrera, but was removed in 2014.

Two trolleybuses that were used as canvasses for public art in Colonia Hipódromo (in Condesa) or Colonia Roma were not former Japanese vehicles. One is a MASA trolleybus built for STE in the 1980s. It was parked as an art installation in the southern part of Parque México until early 2009, then moved east to Calle Toluca behind the Jardín Ramón López Velarde, where it remained until 2014. The other vehicle, formerly STE No. 5122, is an American-built Marmon-Herrington trolleybus whose chassis was built in 1948 but which was retrofitted with a new, modern body – with a slanted front end shape – in 1993 by a company named TATSA (Tanques de Acero Trinity S.A.). In 1997, it was converted to compressed natural gas and its trolley poles removed, but by 2001 it was no longer in STE's fleet. By late 2004, it was in use as a children's reading room in Cuauhtémoc. Later, between 2010/2011 and 2014, it was parked at the south end of Plaza Luis Cabera and used as an artistic canvas, wearing a few different artistic designs during that period.

== See also ==
- Trolleybuses in Mexico City
