= Kurobe Senyō Railway =

Industrial railway in Kurobe, Japan

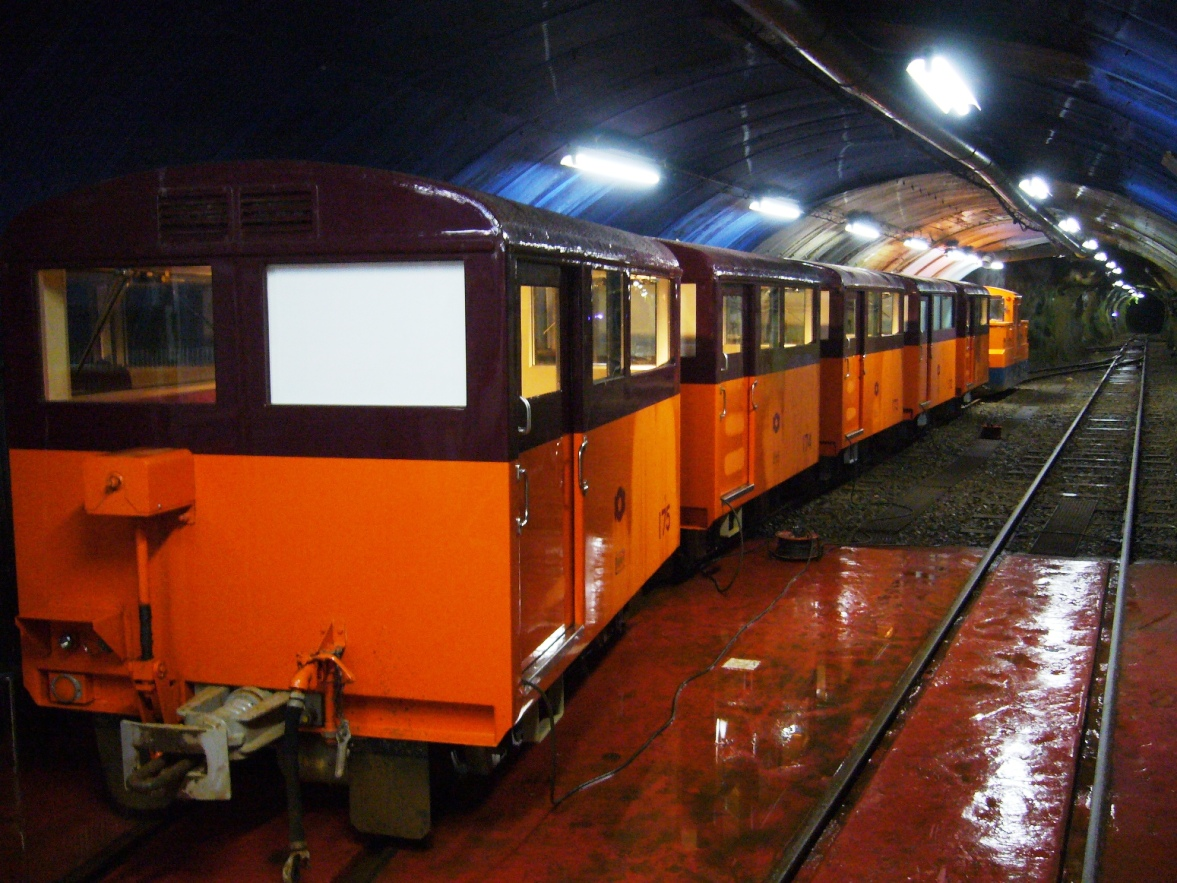
A train at Keyakidaira-Jōbu Station

The Kurobe Senyō Railway (黒部専用鉄道, Kurobe Sen'yō Tetsudō; "Kurobe Industrial Railway") is a 762 mm (2 ft 6 in) narrow gauge industrial railway line in Toyama Prefecture, Japan. It is operated by the Kurobe Gorge Railway Company, a wholly owned subsidiary of the Kansai Electric Power Company. There are two lines, the Jōbu Track (上部軌道, Jōbu Kidō) and the Kuronagi Branch Line (黒薙支線, Kuronagi Shisen). Both lines provide access to Kansai Electric's hydroelectric power plants on the Kurobe River and are generally not open to the public. The Jōbu Track runs regular trains, while the Kuronagi branch sees very infrequent operation.

== Jōbu Track ==
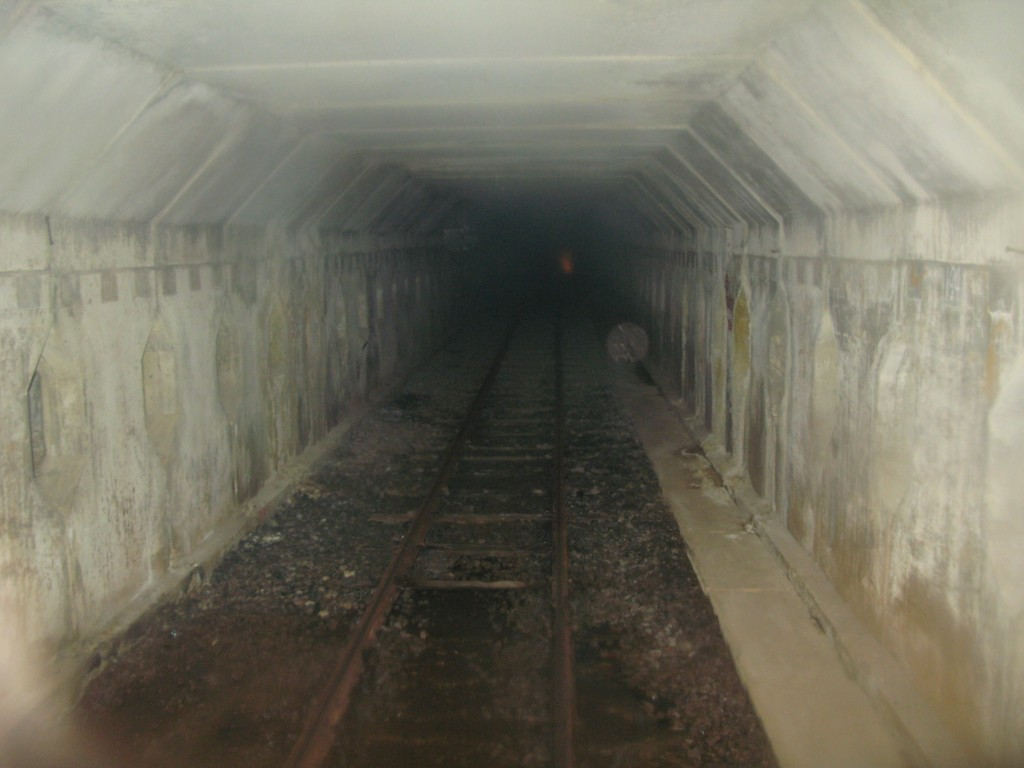
The "High Temperature Tunnel" between Asohara and Sennindani

The Jōbu Track is a 6.4 km (4.0 mi), single track line that runs from Keyakidaira-Jōbu Station to Kurobegawa No.4 Power Station-mae. The Jōbu Track was built as a counterpart to the Kurobe Gorge Railway Main Line, with "Jōbu Track" literally meaning "Upper Track". Conversely, the Kurobe Gorge Railway Main Line is sometimes called the Kabu Track (下部軌道, Kabu Kidō; "Lower Track").

The section between Keyakidaira and Sennindani was built in 1941 for the construction of the Kurobegawa No.3 Power Station. The section between Sennindani and Kurobegawa No.4 Power Station-mae was built in 1963 for the construction of the No.4 station.

A section between Asohara and Sennindani is known as the High Temperature Tunnel (高熱隧道, Kōnetsu Zuidō). During construction, the temperature of the surrounding rocks was 160 °C (320 °F), which caused dynamite used for excavating the tunnel to explode prematurely. The area has since cooled to 40 °C (104 °F).

== Stations ==
Stations listed in italics are depots. All stations are located in Kurobe, Toyama except Kurobegawa No.4 Power Station-mae, which is located in Tateyama, Toyama.

- Keyakidaira-Jōbu (欅平上部; "Upper Keyakidaira"): Altitude 800 m. Linked to Keyakidaira-Kabu (altitude 599m) by an elevator. Keyakidaira-Kabu is virtually the same station as Keyakidaira, Kurobe Gorge Railway Main Line.
- Shiaidani (志合谷)
- Oriodani (折尾谷)
- Asohara (阿曽原)
- Sennindani (仙人谷)
- Kurobegawa No.4 Power Station-mae (黒部川第四発電所前, Kurobegawa Dai-yon Hatsudensho-mae): Altitude 869 m (2,851 ft). Linked to Incline-Jōbu (altitude 1325m) by a funicular.

== Services ==
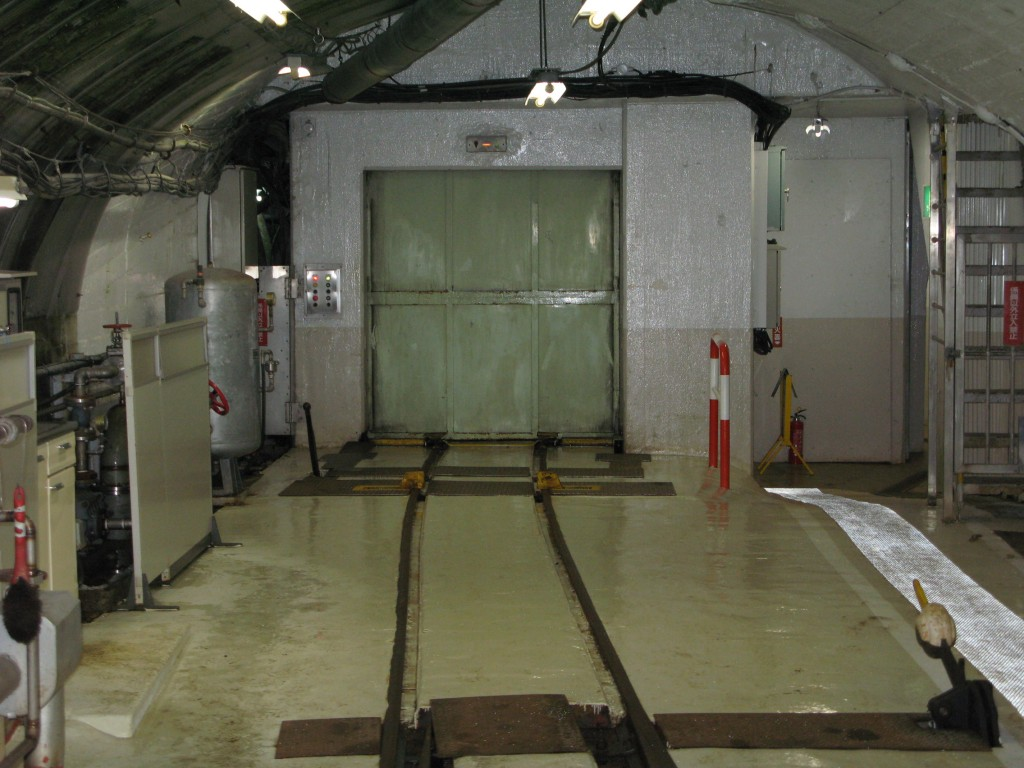
An elevator linking Keyakidaira-Jōbu and Keyakidaira-Kabu

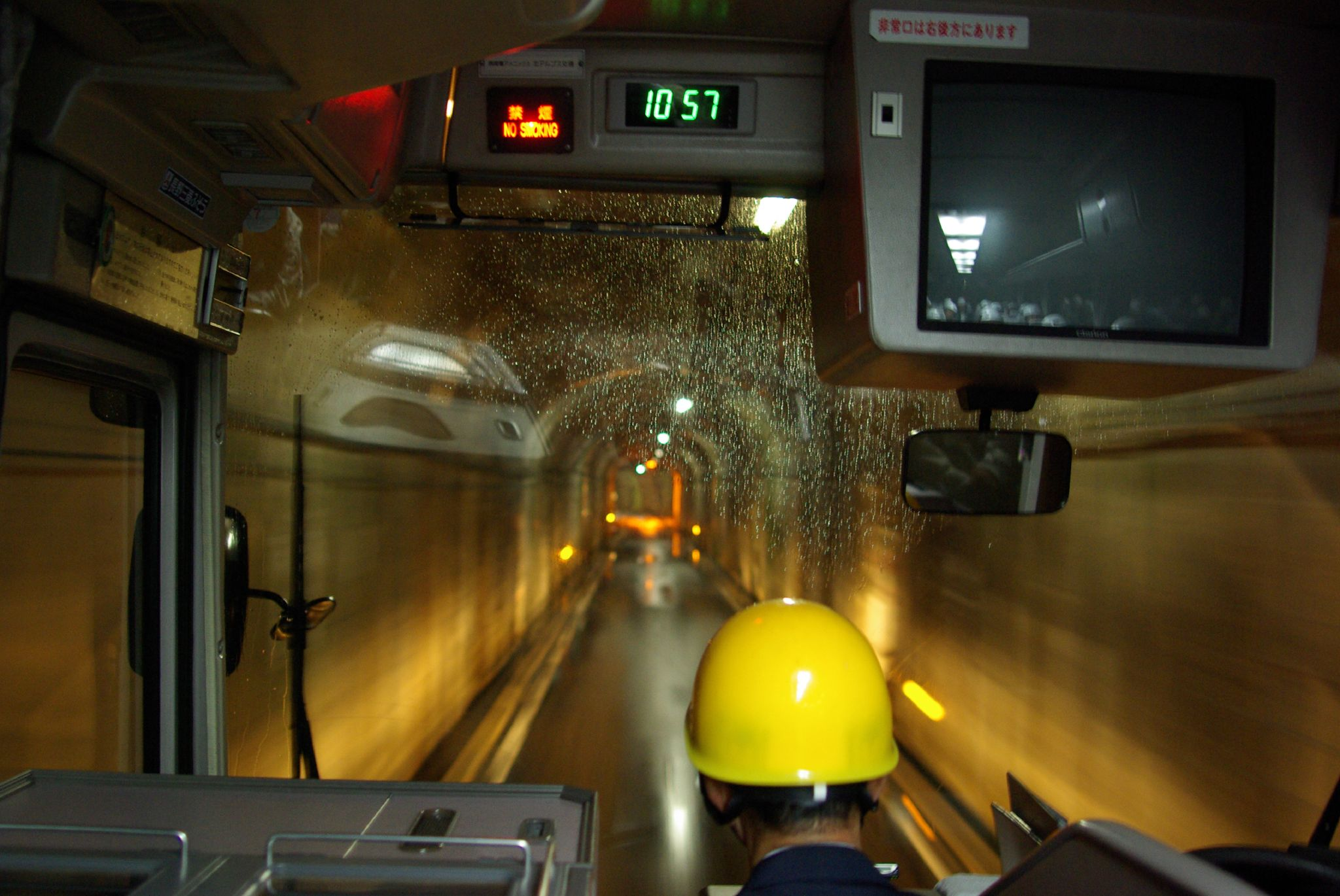
View inside Kurobe Tunnel, the bus tunnel connecting Jōbu Incline with Kurobe Dam, during a study tour

The Jōbu Track forms part of the Kurobe Route, an industrial transportation route which runs between Keyakidaira Station and Kurobe Dam Station, which connect to the Kurobe Gorge Railway Main Line and the Kanden Tunnel Electric Bus respectively. From Keyakidaira Station, a short 500 m (1,640 ft) industrial track leads to Keyakidaira-Kabu station, where a large elevator lifts train carriages one-by-one to Keyakidaira-Jōbu Station, 200 m (656 ft) above. The Jōbu Track then begins from Keyakidaira-Jōbu and runs to Kurobegawa No.4 Power Station-mae. From there, a funicular goes to Incline Jōbu Station, 456 m (1,496 ft) above, and a bus connection links Incline Jōbu Station to Kurobe Dam Station, 10.3 km (6.4 mi) away, via the Kurobe Tunnel.

Motive power on the Jōbu Track is provided by battery-powered locomotives, which tow small freight or passenger cars a few times a day. Battery power is used because the High Temperature Tunnel can flash off the fuels of combustion engines. Because the line runs almost entirely within tunnels, the Jōbu Track operates year-round, unlike the Kurobe Gorge Railway, which closes during winter due to heavy snow.

The Kurobe Route, including the Jōbu Track, is generally not open to the public. However, starting in 1996, visitors are allowed to ride the route as part of a limited study tour. Visitors must book in advance, and in most cases, there are more applicants than the limit, in which case applicants are selected via lottery. In 2007, 34 tours were held with 2040 participants.

== Kuronagi Branch Line ==
The Kuronagi Branch Line runs between Kuronagi (黒薙) of the Kurobe Gorge Railway Main Line and Kuronagi No.2 Power Station (黒薙第二発電所, Kuronagi Dai-ni Hatsudensho) roughly 1.3 km (0.8 mi) away. The line sees very infrequent service; as such, tourists going to the nearby Kuronagi Onsen (黒薙温泉) can walk on the line with permission from a Kuronagi Station attendant. Unlike the Jōbu Track, the line is not entirely within a tunnel.

== See also ==
- Tateyama Sabō Erosion Control Works Service Train
- Kurobe Gorge Railway
- Kanden Tunnel Trolleybus
- Kurobe dam
- Tateyama Kurobe Alpine Route
- Industrial railway
