= Kanden Tunnel Electric Bus =

Electric bus line in Japan

Coordinates: 36°34′3.8″N 137°41′18.4″E

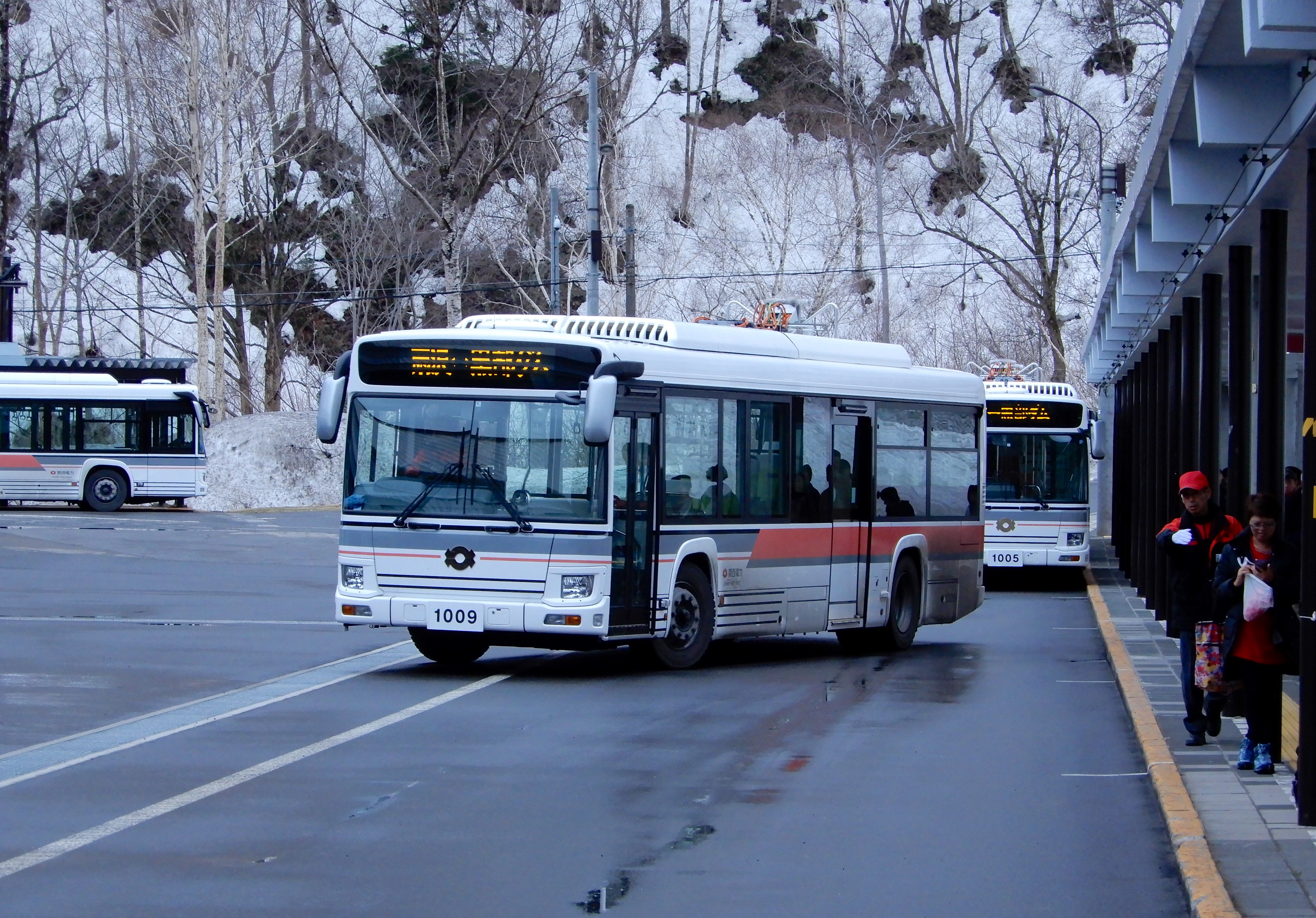
- Battery-powered buses at Ōgizawa Station in 2019

Overview
- Stations: 2

Service
- Type: Battery electric bus in exclusive tunnel
- System: Tateyama Kurobe Alpine Route
- Operator: Kansai Electric Power Company

History
- Opened: 1964

Technical
- Line length: 6.1 km (3.8 mi)

The Kanden Tunnel Electric Bus (関電トンネル電気バス, Kanden Tonneru Denki Basu) is a Japanese electric bus line between Ōgizawa Station, Ōmachi and Kurobe Dam Station, Tateyama. It was operated by trolleybuses from its opening in 1964 until 2018. The line does not have any official name. The 6.1-km line runs in a tunnel for 5.4 km, the approximately 700-metre above-ground section consisting of around 300 metres of open roadway at and near Ōgizawa station and 400 metres covered by a snow shelter on the approach to the tunnel. Opened in 1964 as a trolleybus line, it was one of the last two trolleybus lines that existed in Japan. The line is a part of the Tateyama Kurobe Alpine Route, together with another trolleybus line, the Tateyama Tunnel Trolleybus. The line closed in November 2018 for renewal, and all of the trolleybuses have been replaced by the new battery-electric buses. All of the overhead wiring was removed and new charging pads were installed at the Ōgizawa terminal.

== History ==
The tunnel was originally built to efficiently bring supplies to the site for the construction of the hydroelectric plant of Kurobe Dam, by the Kansai Electric Power Company (Kanden or KEPCO). It is only one lane wide, except for a short section near the middle, which is wider so as to allow vehicles going in opposite directions to pass. The trolleybus service began operation on 1 August 1964. After the dam and its power station were completed, KEPCO opened the tunnel for public use, as the power company had been ordered to do so by the Ministry of Health and Welfare. The single-lane tunnel was not suitable for cars, and there was no space for parking, so the company chose to build a trolleybus line in the tunnel.

In 2017, KEPCO announced that trolleybus operation would be discontinued at the end of the 2018 operating season and that battery-powered buses would take over the service at the beginning of the 2019 season. On 15 April 2019, the line was reopened with 15 new battery-electric buses.

=== End of trolleybus era ===
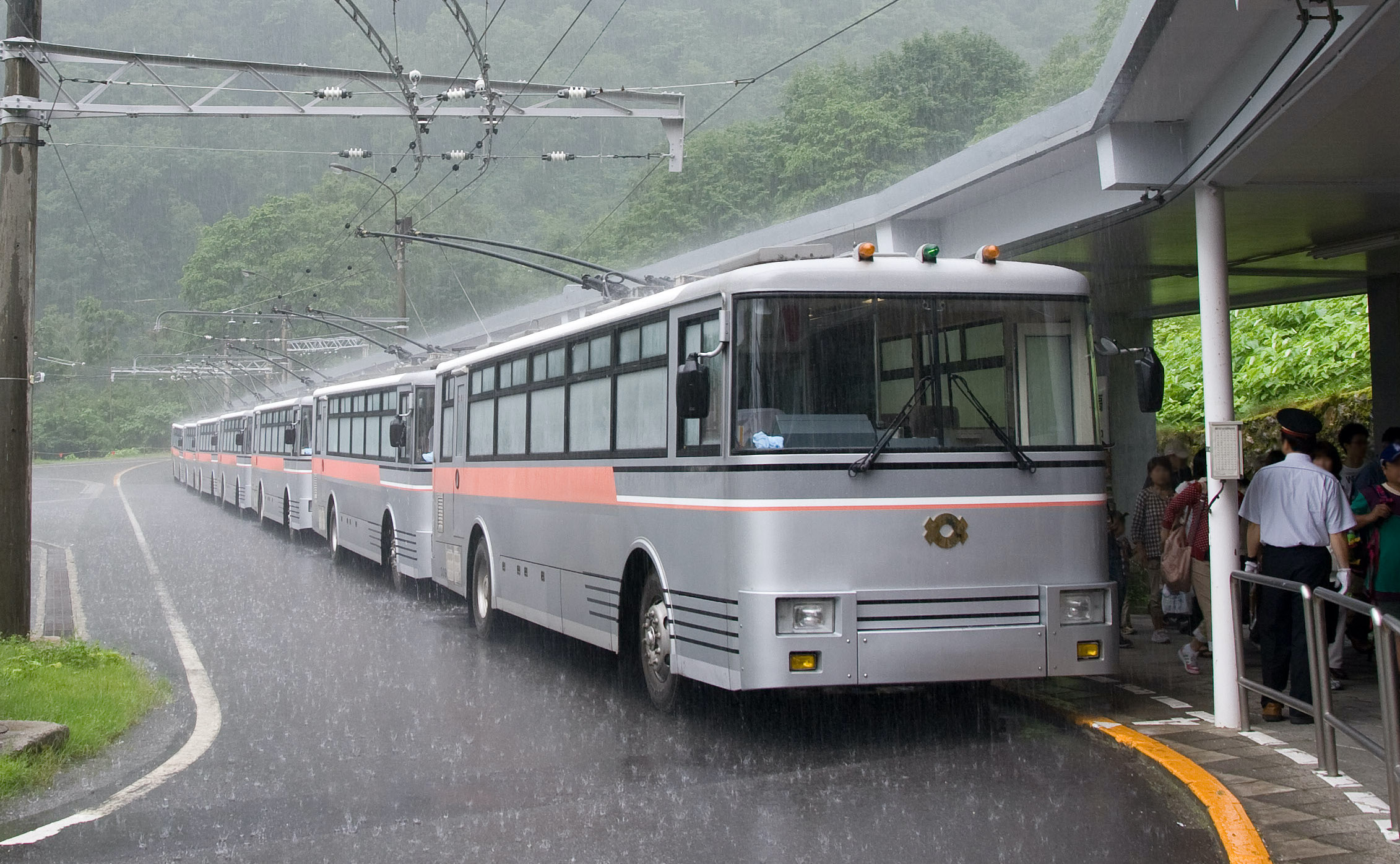
Seven trolleybuses lined-up at Ōgizawa Station in 2011. Trolleybus operation ended in 2018 after 54 years.

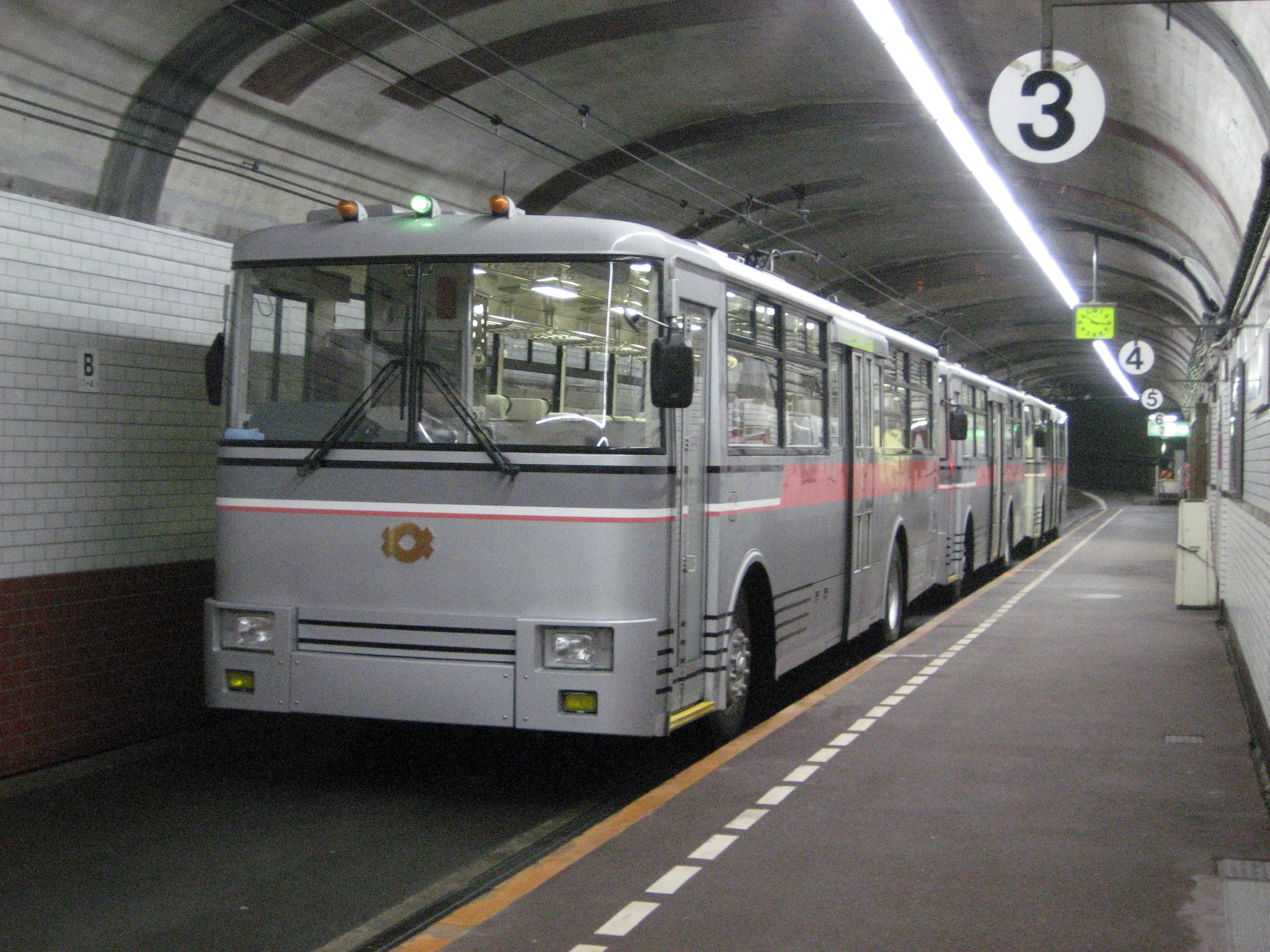
Trolleybuses laying over at Kurobe Dam Station in 2007

The last day of trolleybus operation was 30 November 2018. To commemorate the end of trolleybus operation, several events were held between 15 April 2018 and the final day of the 2018 season, on 30 November.

== Operation ==
The Kanden Tunnel electric bus line is owned and operated by the Kansai Electric Power Company (KEPCO), the same company as had owned it during the trolleybus era.

Before the withdrawal of the trolleybuses, KEPCO was once to be considered the railway operator with the largest capital stock in the country, as trolleybus lines are legally considered as a sort of railway in Japan.

=== Basic data ===
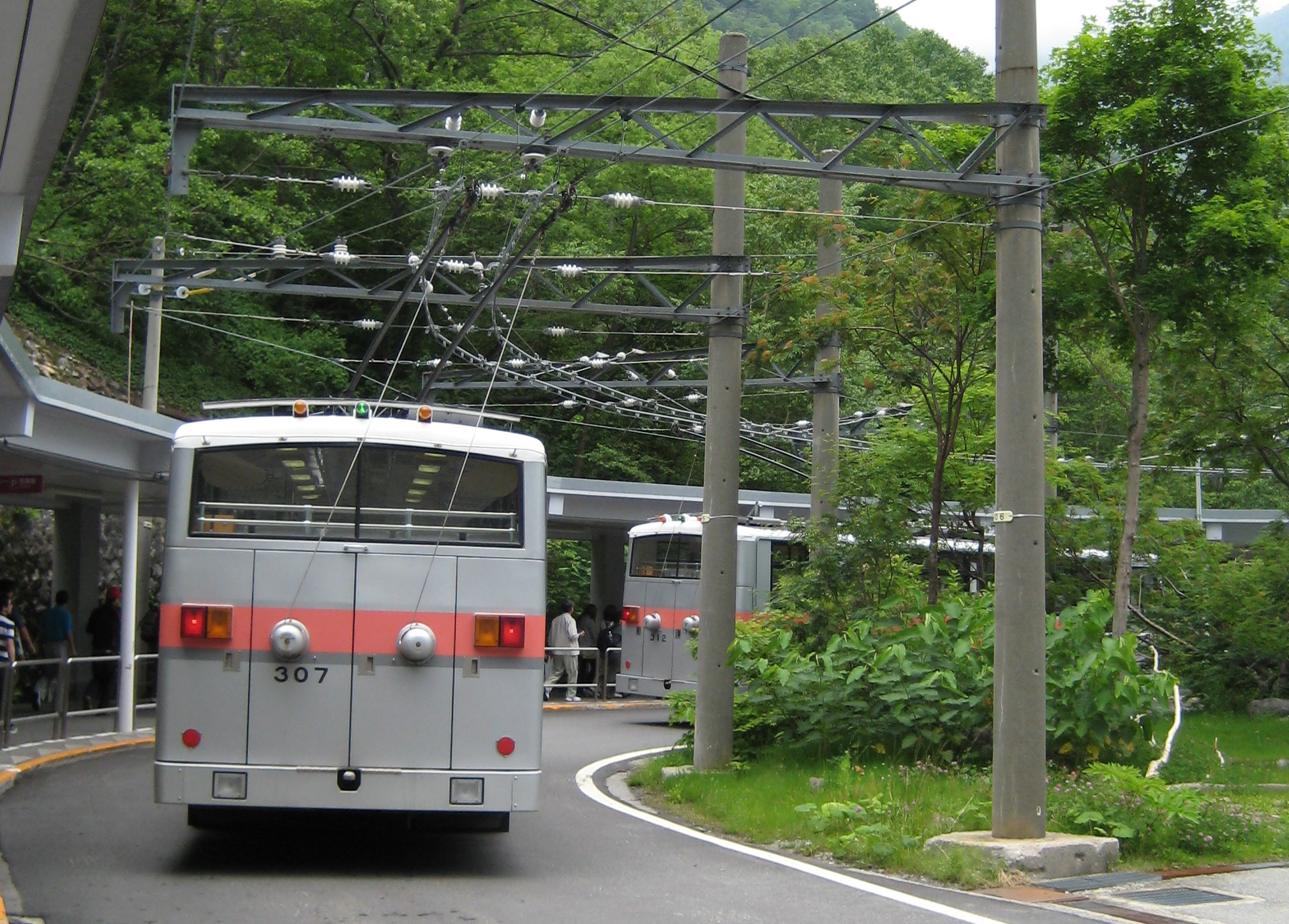
Trolleybuses at the lower terminus, Ōgizawa Station, the only place where the line is above-ground

- Distance: 6.1 km
- Stations: 2 (the two terminals; there are no intermediate stations)
- Track: Single, with a passing area in the middle of the route
- Railway signalling: Counter checking and staff token.
- Travel time: 16 minutes
- Current fleet (as of 2020): 15 Hino Blue Ribbon electric buses, built in 2019

During peak hours, multiple buses operate through the tunnel in convoys. As many as 10 buses can be operated in a single convoy if ridership is high. During the trolleybus era (at least its later years), the maximum number of trolleybuses in a convoy was seven, and that was the maximum number that the passing area in mid-tunnel was able to accommodate.

=== Trolleybuses ===
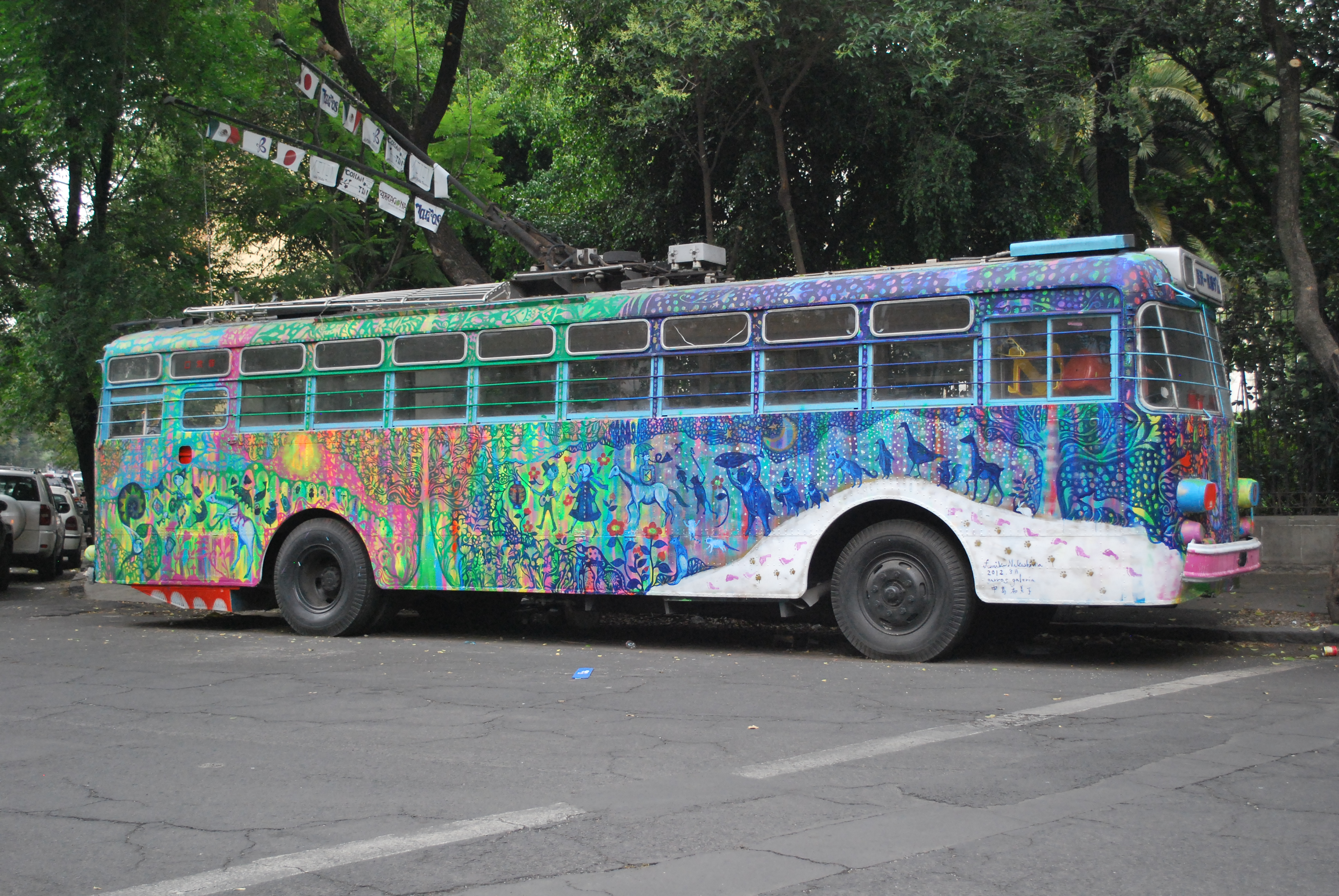
One of the line's original trolleybuses pictured in Mexico City in 2012, in use as a public art installation

The original fleet comprised six Mitsubishi Fuso trolleybuses with bodies by Osaka Sharyo Kogyo, built in 1964, numbered 101–106 (renumbered 111–116 in 1976). Additional vehicles built by the same manufacturers, to the same or very similar design, were acquired gradually—at a rate of about one new trolleybus per year—between 1966 and 1973, carrying fleet numbers 107–110 and 201–205 (renumbered 117–120 and 211–215 in 1976). The first six trolleybuses had only one door, at the front, but a second door was added in 1976, in the center. The next four (117–120) also had only a single door, and retained this configuration. The 200-series vehicles came with two doors. They had longitudinal seating, whereas the 100-series vehicles had forward-facing seats.

All of the 1964–1973 vehicles were withdrawn from service in the early to mid-1990s and replaced by a new fleet of nine trolleybuses built by the same two manufacturers, in 1993 and 1994, and numbered 301–309. Another six of the same type were delivered later, by 1996, making the full new trolleybus fleet 15 vehicles numbered 301–315. All had two-and-one seating (forward-facing seats in pairs on one side of the vehicle and single seats on the other).

Of the previous fleet, the first six were scrapped, but all nine of the others were donated to Mexico City's Servicio de Transportes Eléctricos (STE), for possible use there, arriving in Mexico City in 1994–1997, but they were never placed in service by STE.

After the line's closure as a trolleybus line in November 2018, one of the 15 Mitsubishi/Osaka Sharyo trolleybuses built in 1993–1996, No. 301 of 1993, was preserved and placed on permanent display with Ogizawa depot.

== See also ==
- Tateyama Kurobe Alpine Route
- Kurobe Senyō Railway
- List of trolleybus systems
- List of railway lines in Japan
