= Ōgizawa Station =

Former railway station and a bus stop in Ōmachi, Nagano Prefecture, Japan

Coordinates: 36.558130°N 137.722041°E

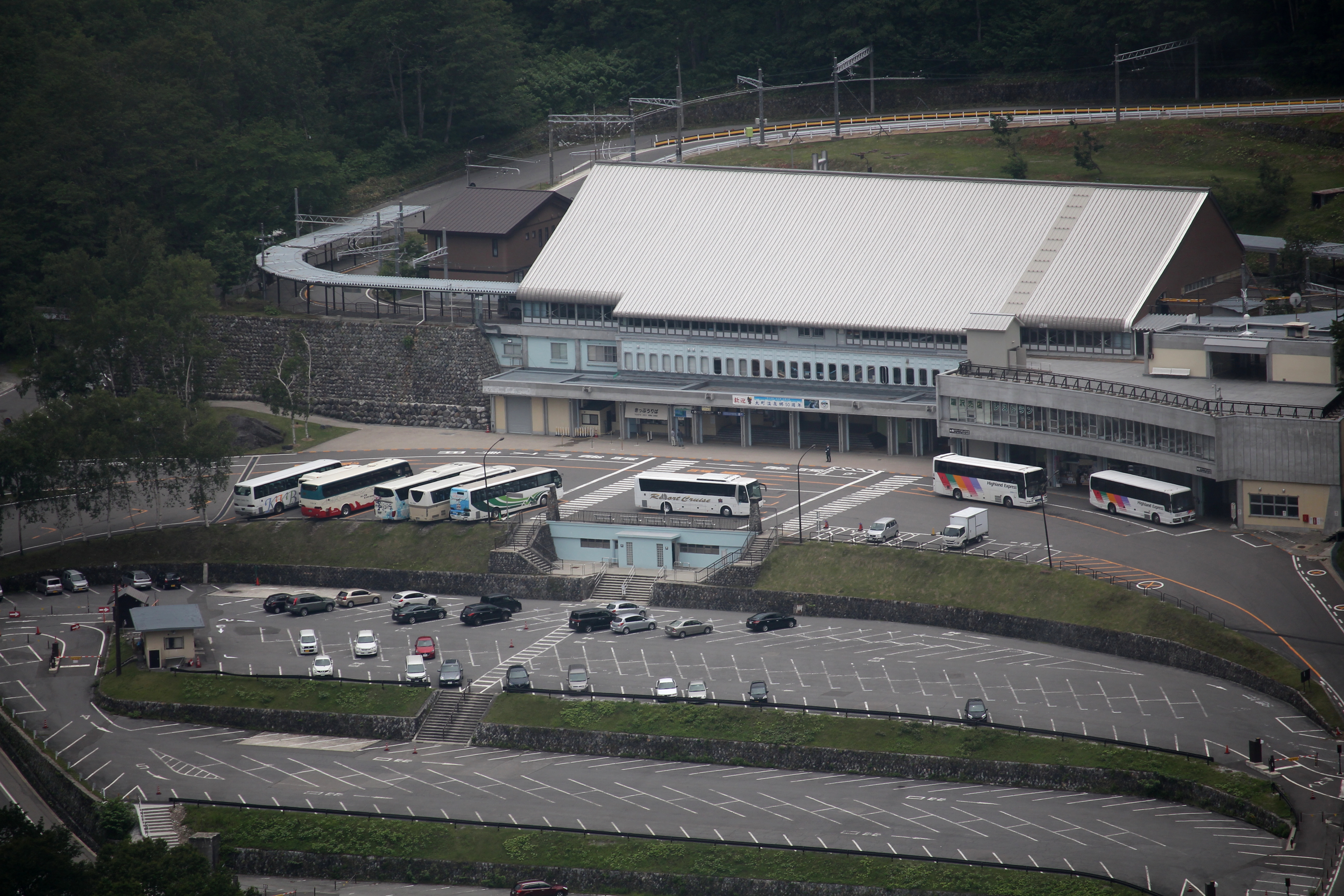
Ōgizawa Station

Ōgizawa Station (扇沢駅, Ōgizawa-eki) is an Electric bus station located in the city of Ōmachi, Nagano, Japan, nestled below the Great Northern Alps operated by Tateyama Kurobe Kankō. Ogizawa Station is one of two starting points for ascending the Tateyama-Kurobe Alpine Route – the other being Tateyama Station on the Toyama-side of the mountain range.

== Lines ==
- Kanden Tunnel Electric Bus (Tateyama Kurobe Alpine Route)

== Adjacent stations ==
«	Service	»
Kanden Tunnel Trolleybus
Kurobe Dam	-	Terminus

== History ==
The station opened on 1 August 1964, as a Trolleybus station connecting Kurobe Dam Station and this station. The line was turned into a bus line, and was abolished as a railway station on 1 December 2018.

== Gallery ==
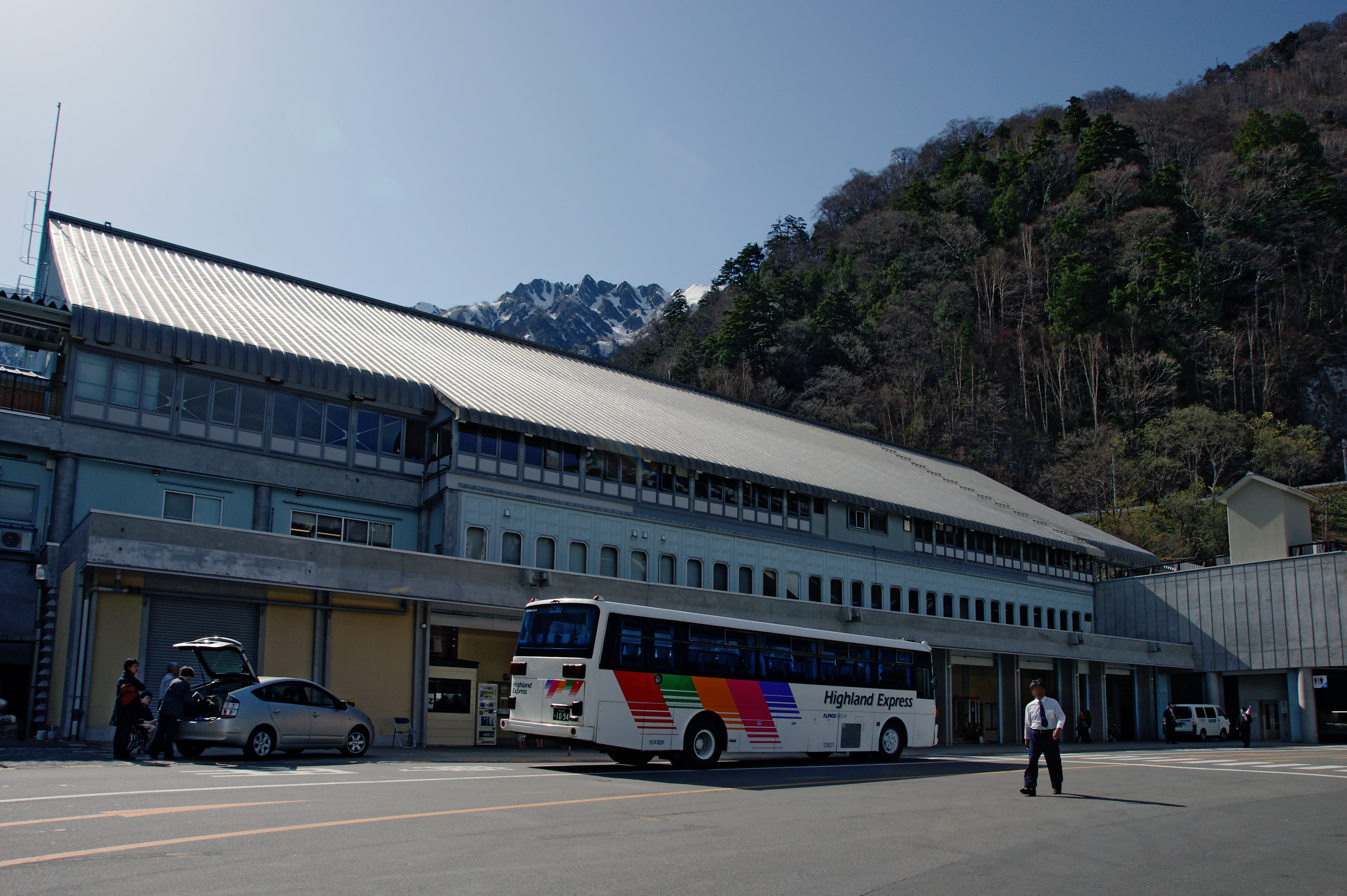
Station building

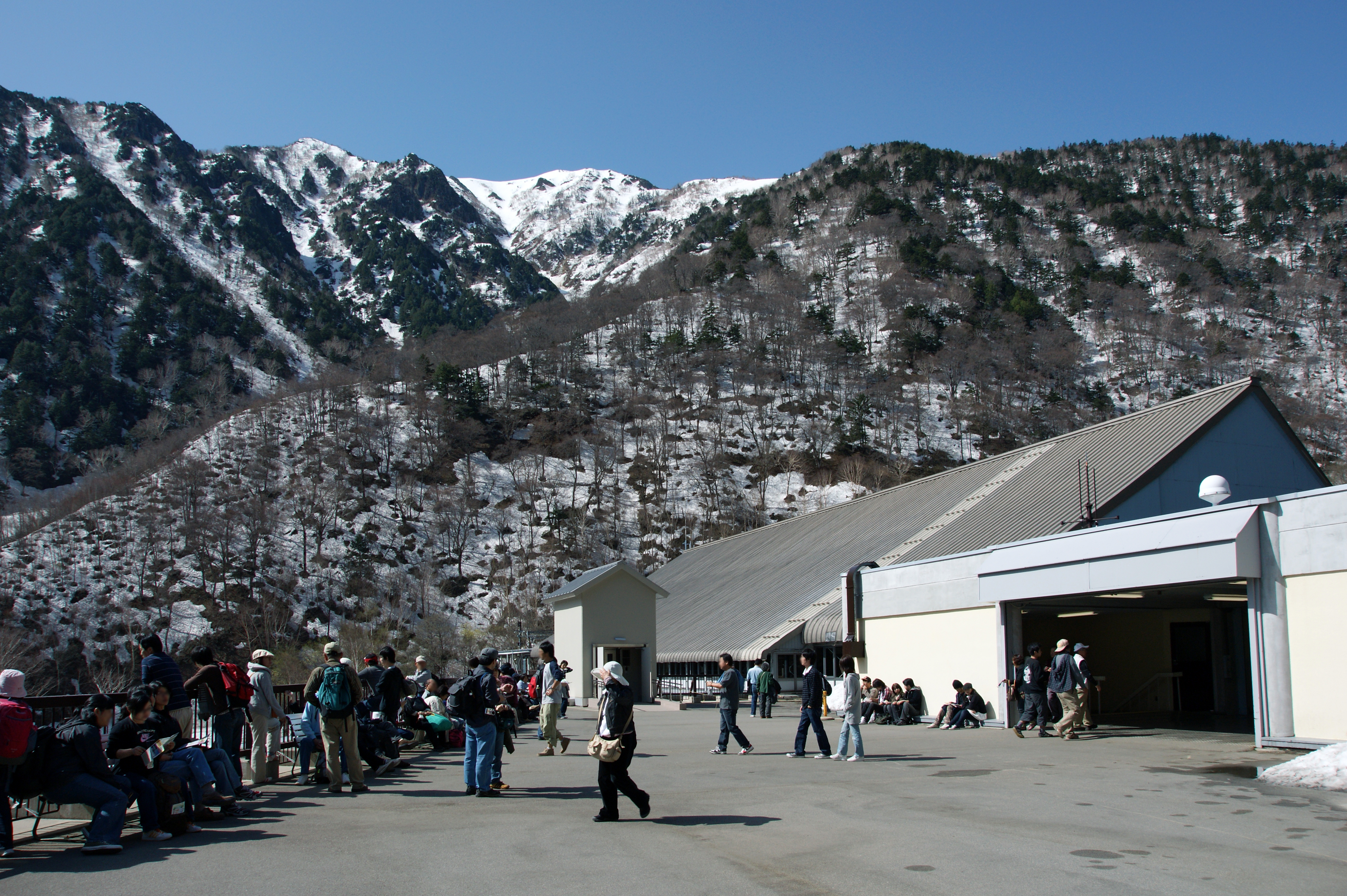
Top of the station building

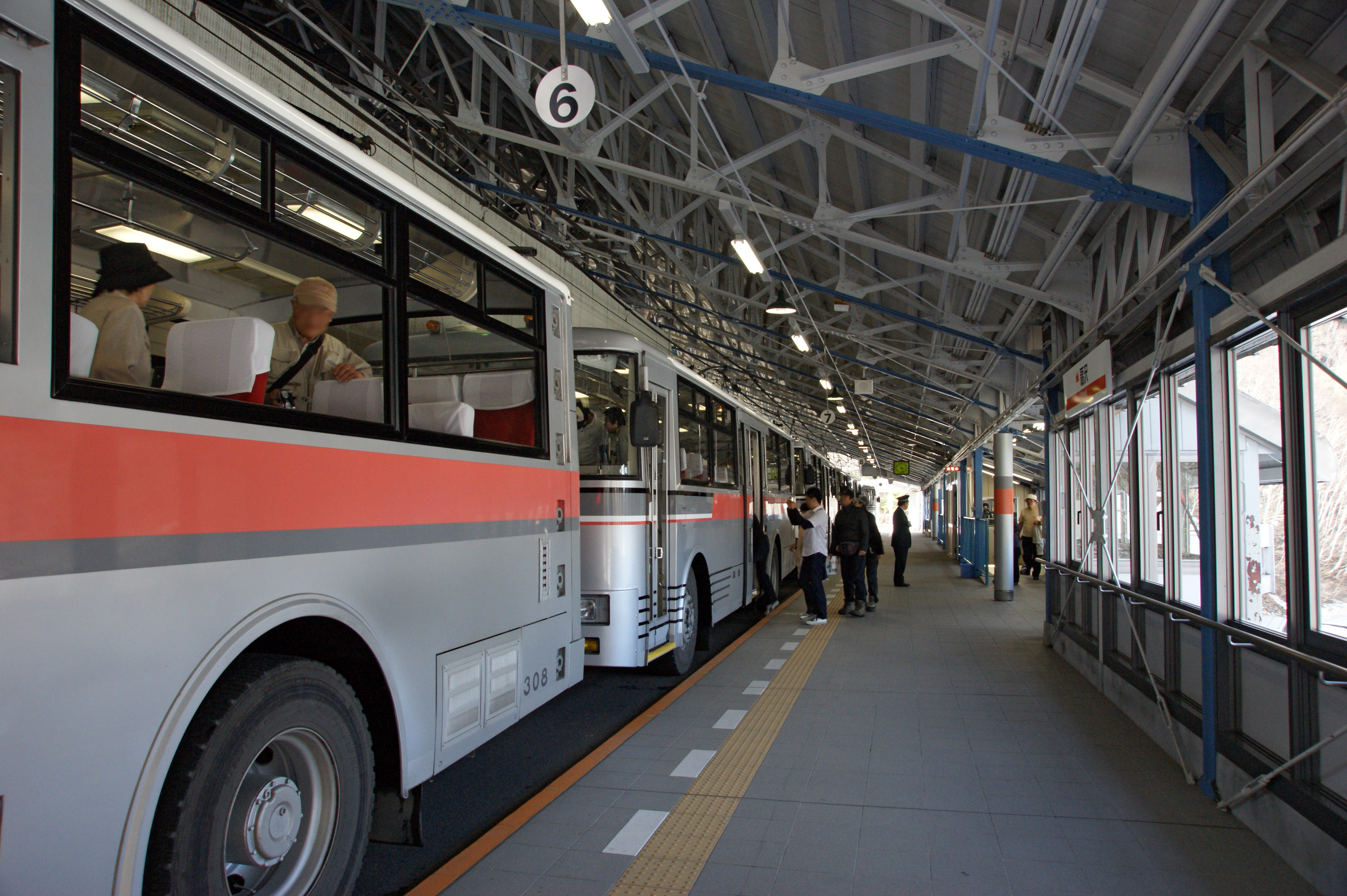
Departure platform

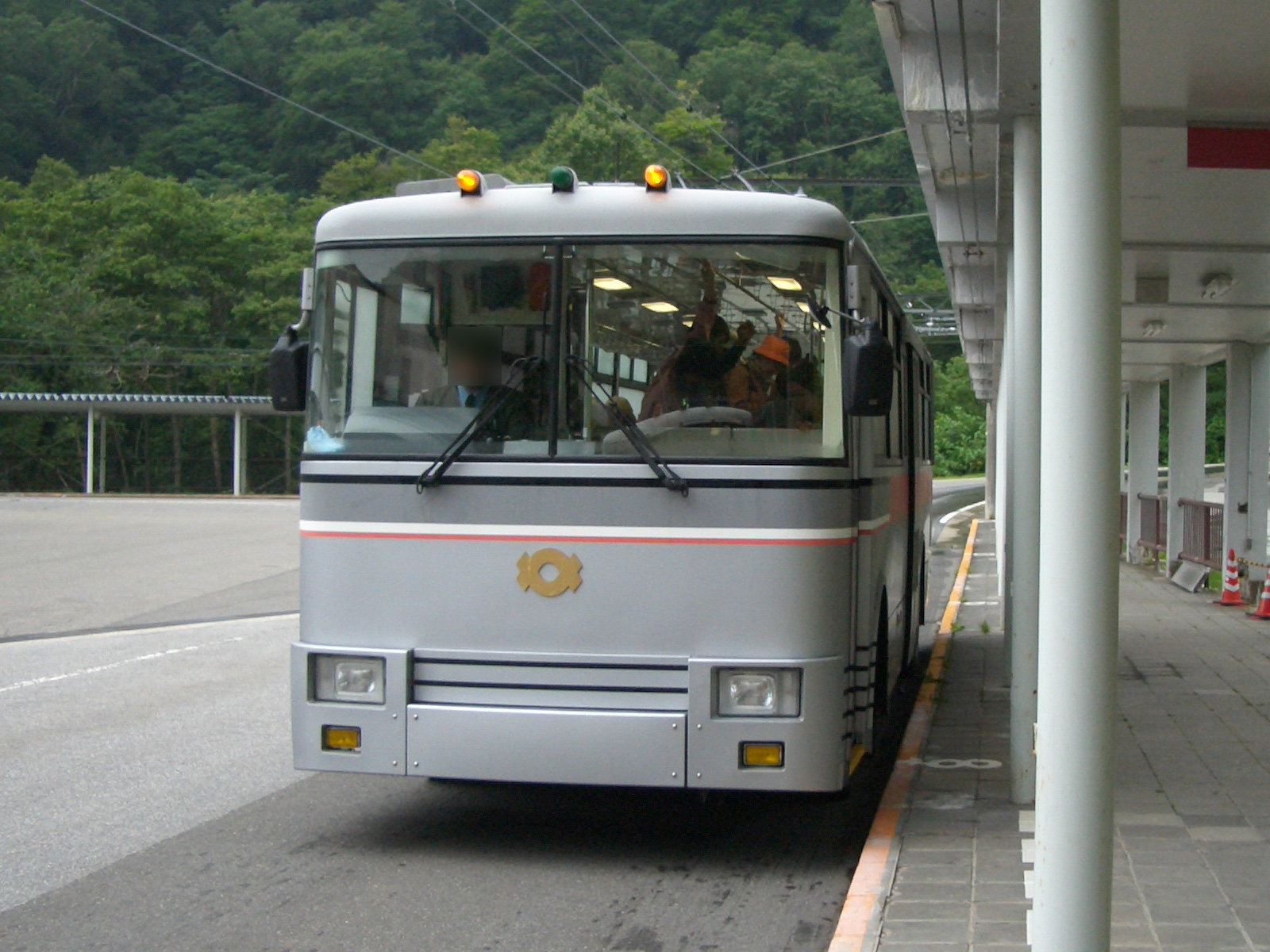
Arrival platform

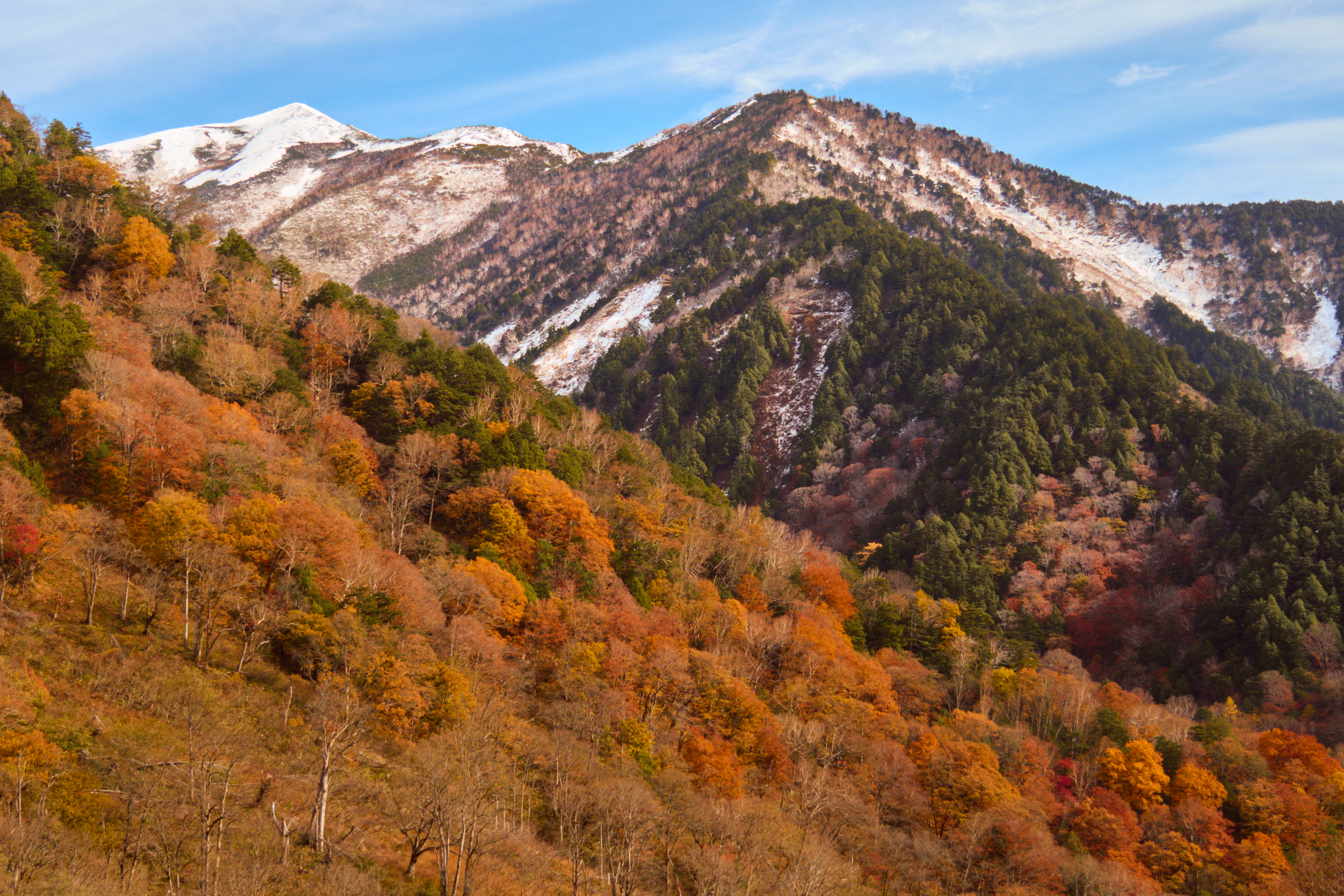
Autumn views from Ogizawa Station
