= Kurobe Dam Station =

Trolleybus station in Tateyama, Japan

Coordinates: 36°34′00″N 137°39′58″E

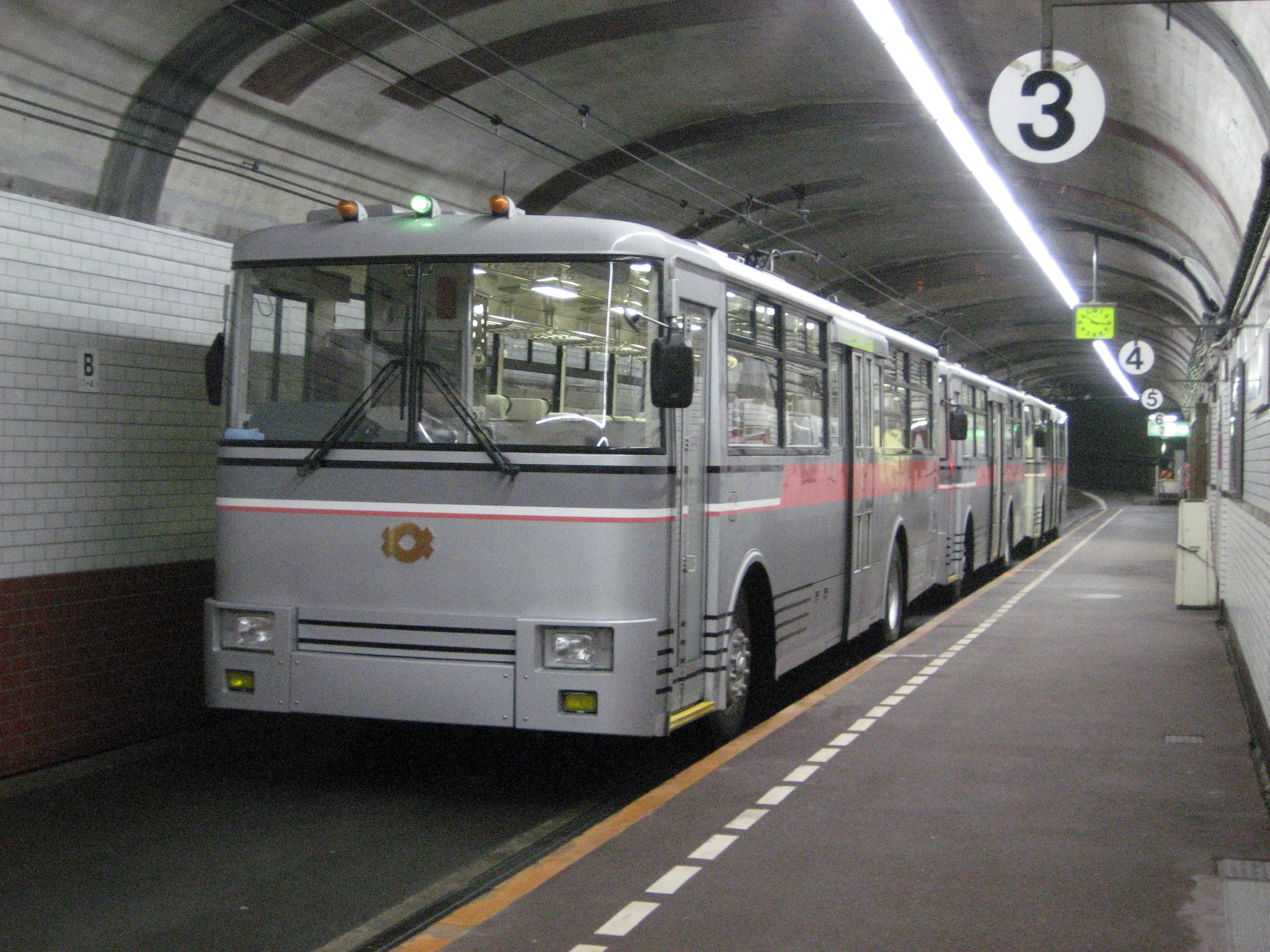
Kurobe Dam Station platform.

Kurobe Dam Station (黒部ダム駅, Kurobe Damu-eki) is a trolleybus station in Tateyama, Nakaniikawa District, Toyama Prefecture, Japan. The station offers views of Kurobe Dam, which is the tallest dam in Japan.

== Lines ==
- Tateyama Kurobe Kankō
  - Kanden Tunnel Trolleybus (Tateyama Kurobe Alpine Route)

== Adjacent stations ==
«	Service	»
Kanden Tunnel Trolleybus
Terminus	-	Ōgisawa
